= Uniforms of the Royal Danish Army =

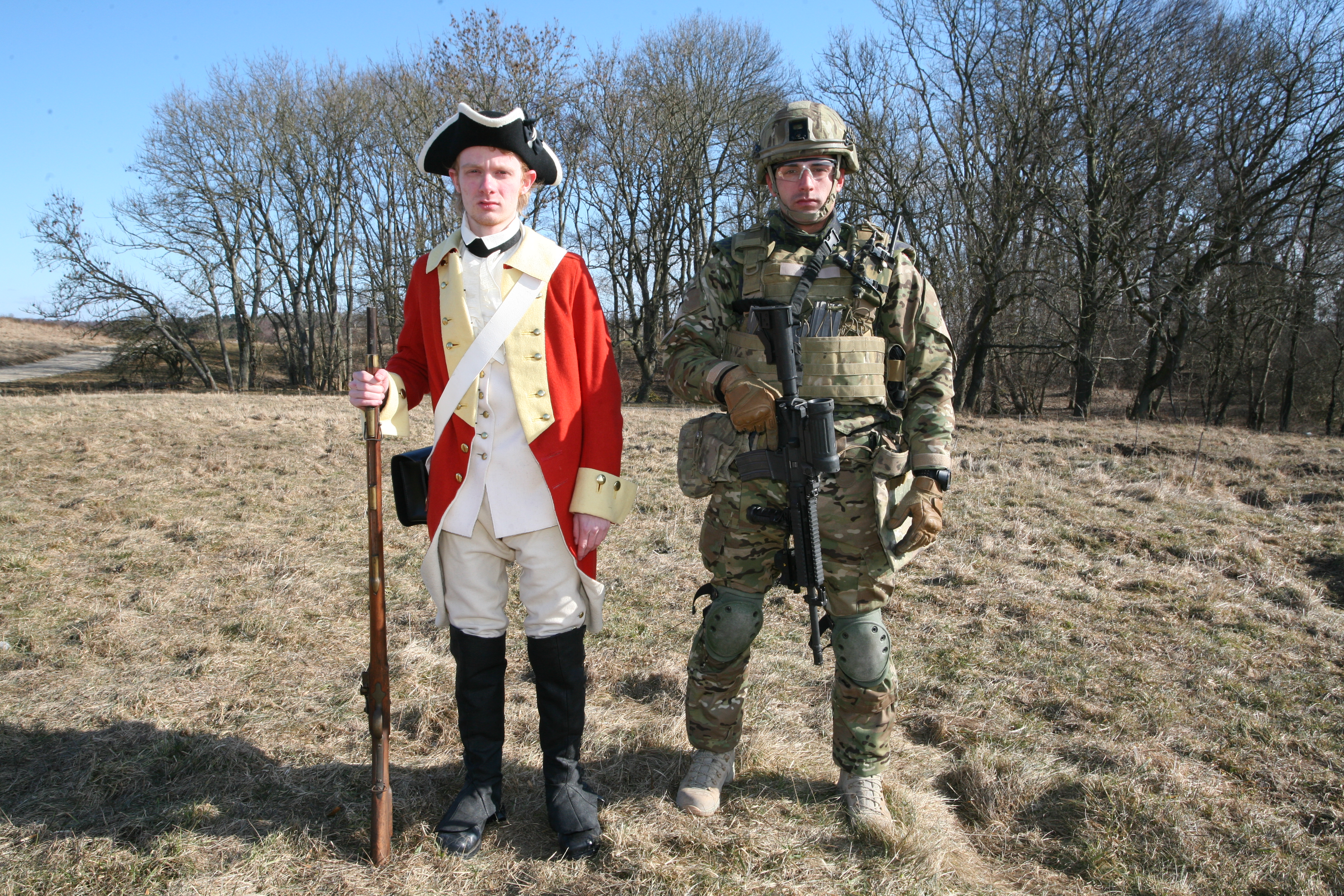
A comparison between the Danish army uniform from the 18th century and a 2015 uniform

The Uniforms of the Royal Danish Army distinguish soldiers from other service members. Royal Danish Army uniforms were originally influenced by French, Prussian and Russian military traditions. However, in more recent times, its uniforms have been characterized as being influenced by British uniforms, and, more significantly, American uniforms.

== History ==
=== Standardization ===
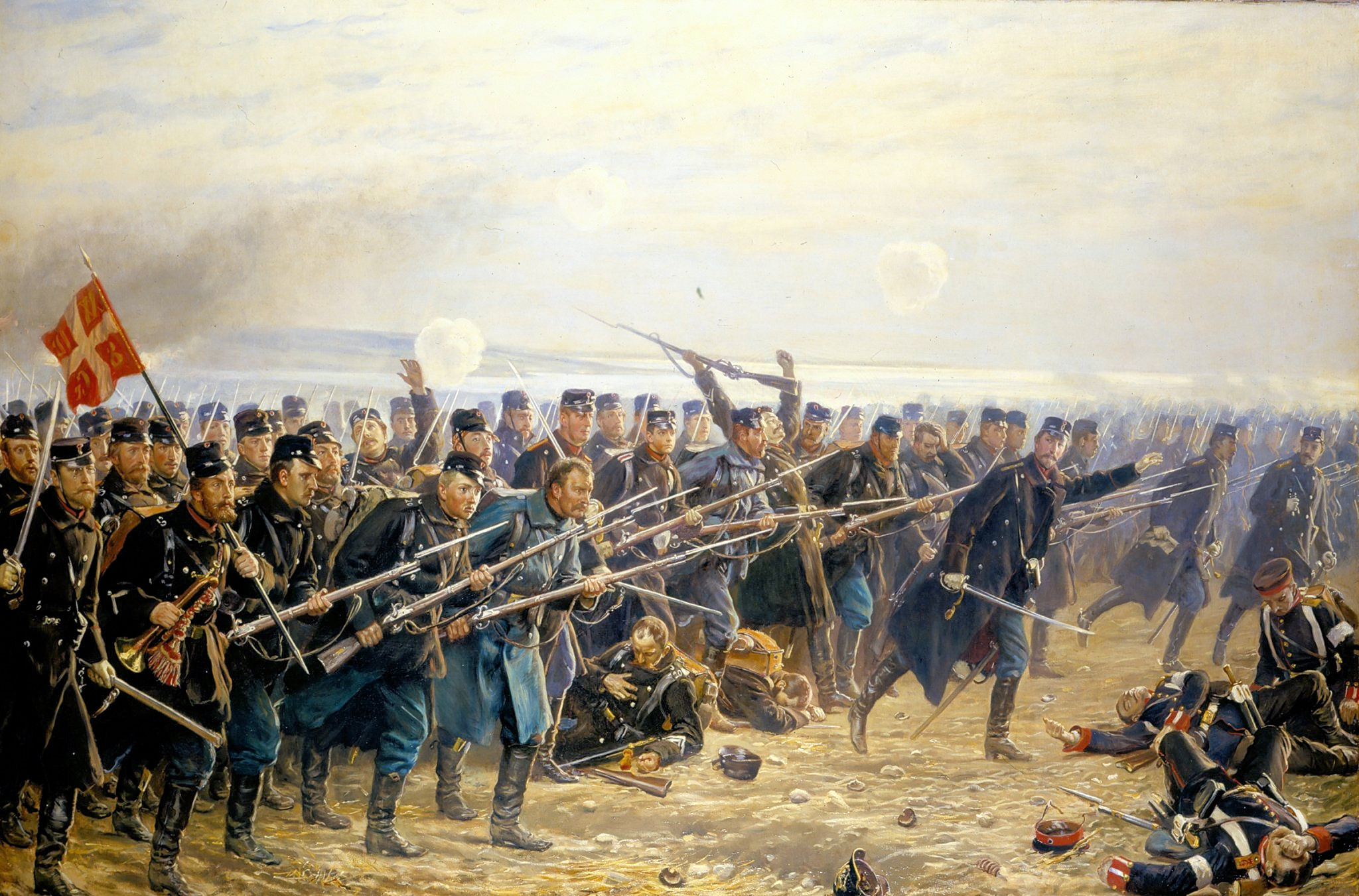
Painting showing the standard Danish uniform in 1864

The Danish Royal Army uniforms can be traced back to the creation of the army in 1614, where a couple of regiments were given similar outfits by the state. Towards the end of the 17th century, different army regiments began to introduce the distinct red coat. During the Scanian War of 1676–1679, the price of scarlet cloth for uniforms soared and was widely sought after. However, it was only after a Royal decree in 1711, that it was expanded to all army regiments. Though all army regiments were required to have red coats, there were no standard uniform, with each regiment having different regimental Facing colours. The uniforms within the regiments were also different based on elements, such as rank, resulted in more than 400 different types of uniforms. When Claude Louis, Comte de Saint-Germain became head of the army, he attempted to change the base colour to Prussian blue. However, Claude Louis was removed from power, in 1766, and a counter-order was issued changing it back to red. When Claude Louis returned to power, in March 1767, he instead issued orders to change the colour to white as the French Royal Army. Though, neither the blue nor white saw general use. Throughout the next 50+ years, the uniforms saw changes in cut of jacket and trousers, removal of the Tricorne in favour of the shako. Economic hardship also affected the uniforms, causing the removal of extravagant epaulets, feathers, tresses, and galloons.

In 1842, the standardized uniform was presented throughout the Army. The standardized uniform retained the red coat and introduced light blue pants for all. The unique regimental colours were removed and replaced with standards of the flag of Denmark, making it was harder to differentiate between the regiments. This led to all the regiments being given numbers, which would then be placed on the shoulder-straps. In 1848, the red coat was exchanged with a Double-breasted dark blue jacket, and the cumbersome shako was replaced with a more practical kepi. In 1880, the uniforms saw minor updates, along with a colour change of the hats, which had been made dark blue a few years prior.

Danish M/1910 Greatcoat (reissued to CB and then CF later)

By the turn of the century, it was apparent the blue uniform was less than ideal as a field uniform and was in need of a replacement which was less prominent in the terrain. In February 1903, the more groundbreaking M/1903 uniform was presented to the General Staff. This uniform was in Reseda green and was inspired by the lessons learned by the great colonial powers, where the bright blue/red jackets were too visible on the battlefield. However, after only 3 years it was withdrawn from service, as the General Staff did not want to replace the beautiful M/1880. (Note: Only the Life Guard were issued the uniform, which it used until 1939.) The following uniform was the M/1910, which was blue like the previous ones, however, a more simplified version going from double-breasted to Single-breasted. The kepi was also hardened, to be more like the French version.

With the increased risk of a German invasion during World War I, the Security Force was established to ensure Danish neutrality. This led to the 57,000 soldiers being deployed, creating extra demand on the production of the blue M/1910 uniforms. The shortage of blue dye and evidence that blue uniforms were less suitable in modern combat, led the General Staff to halt the production of the M/1910, and instead produce uniforms in different shades of grey, which then became the M/1915 uniform. Another lesson learned, was to remove the elaborate rank insignia, and move the insignia to the collar. However, due to supply shortages of the new uniform, both the M/1880 and M/1910 uniforms were still common to see during the war.

Uniforms
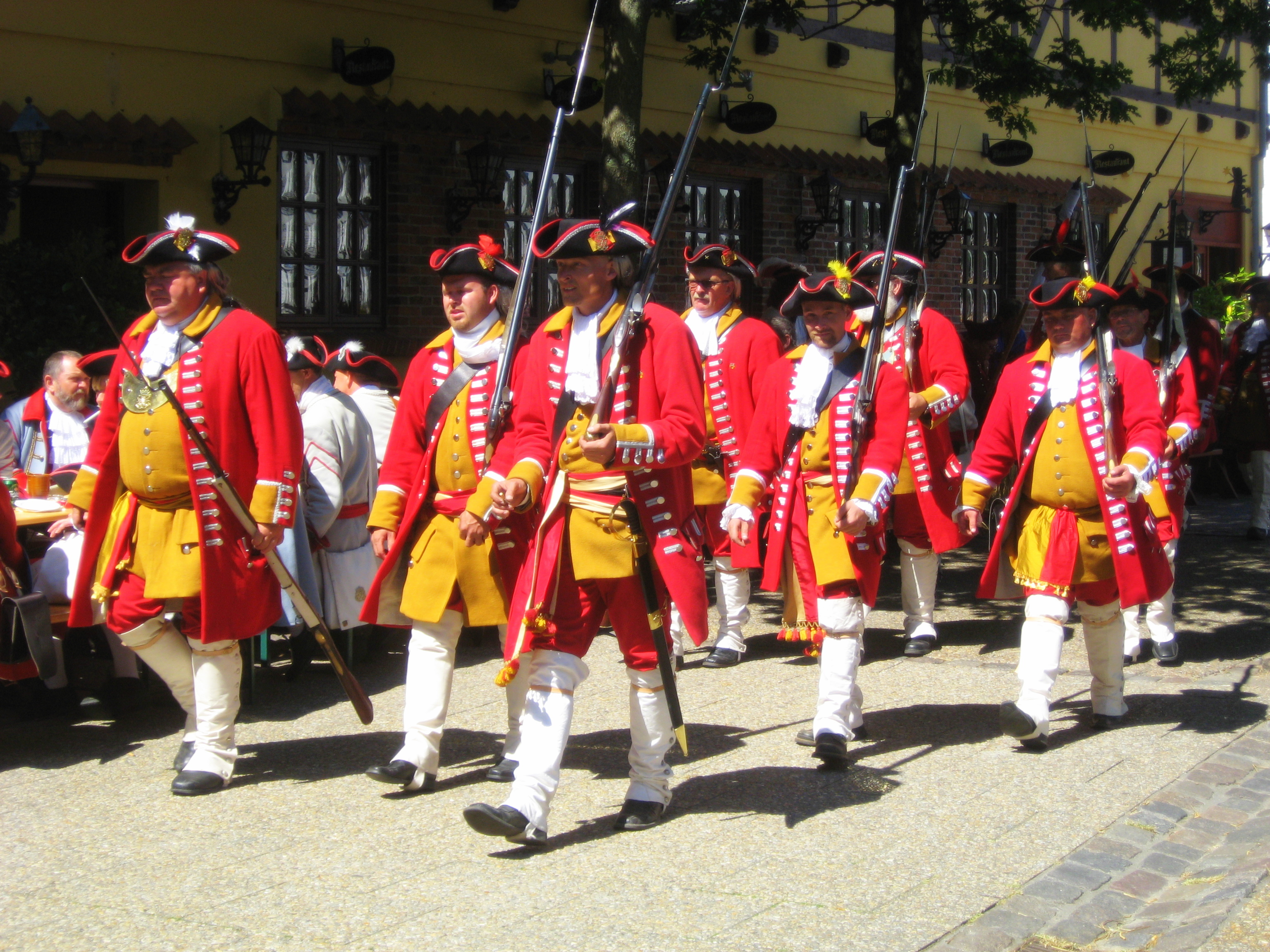
Reenactment with red coat

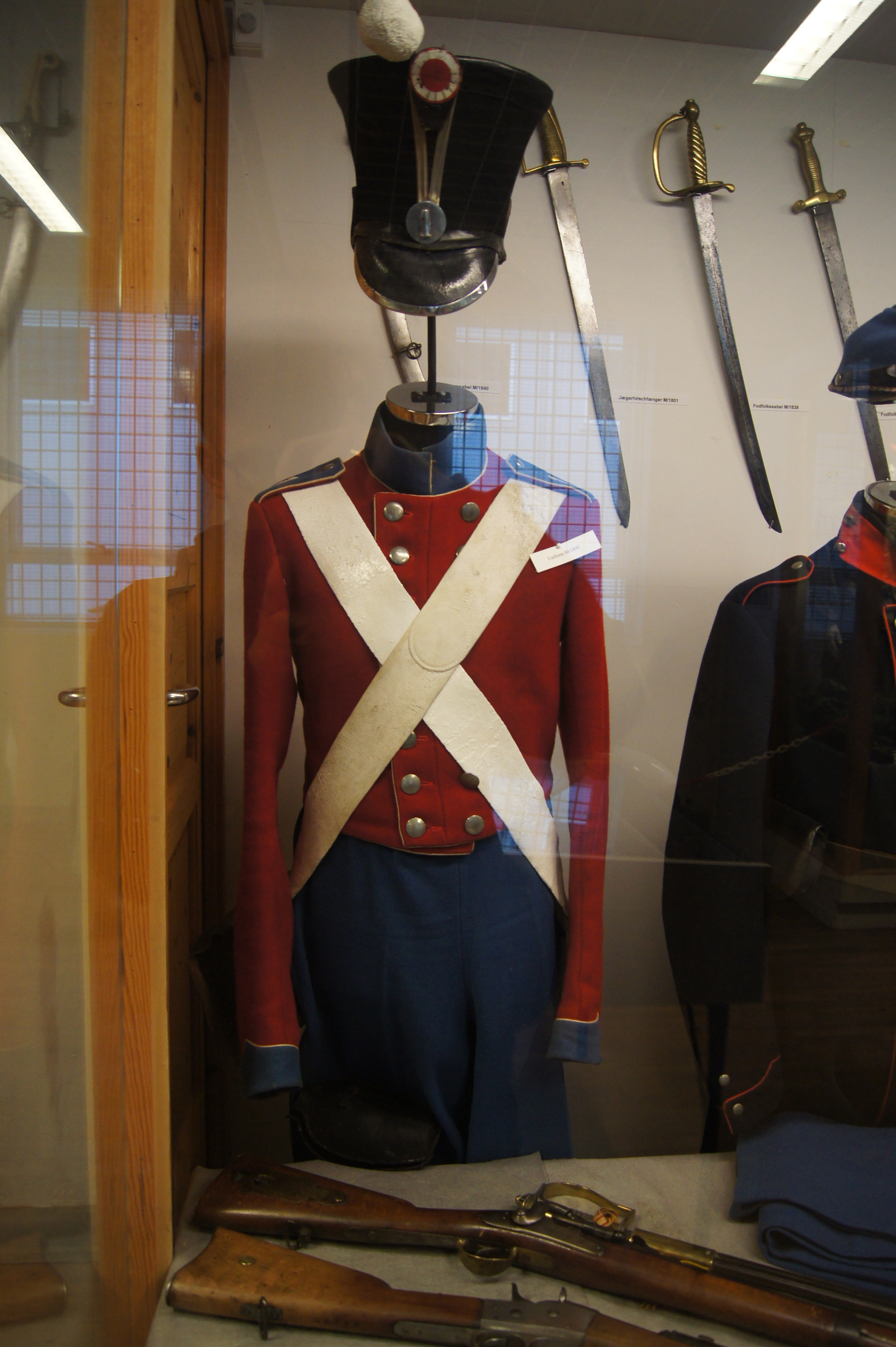
M/1842

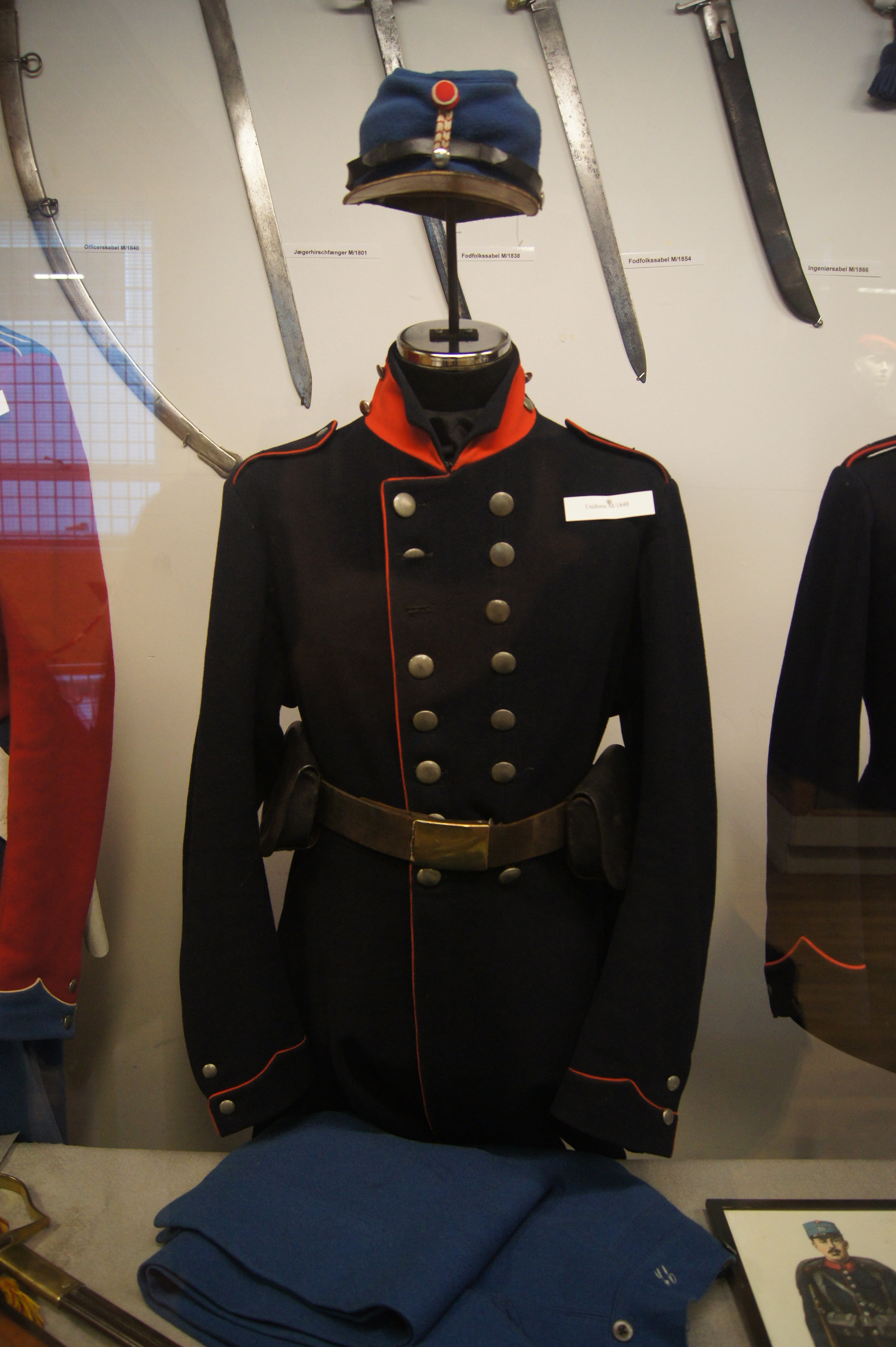
M/1848

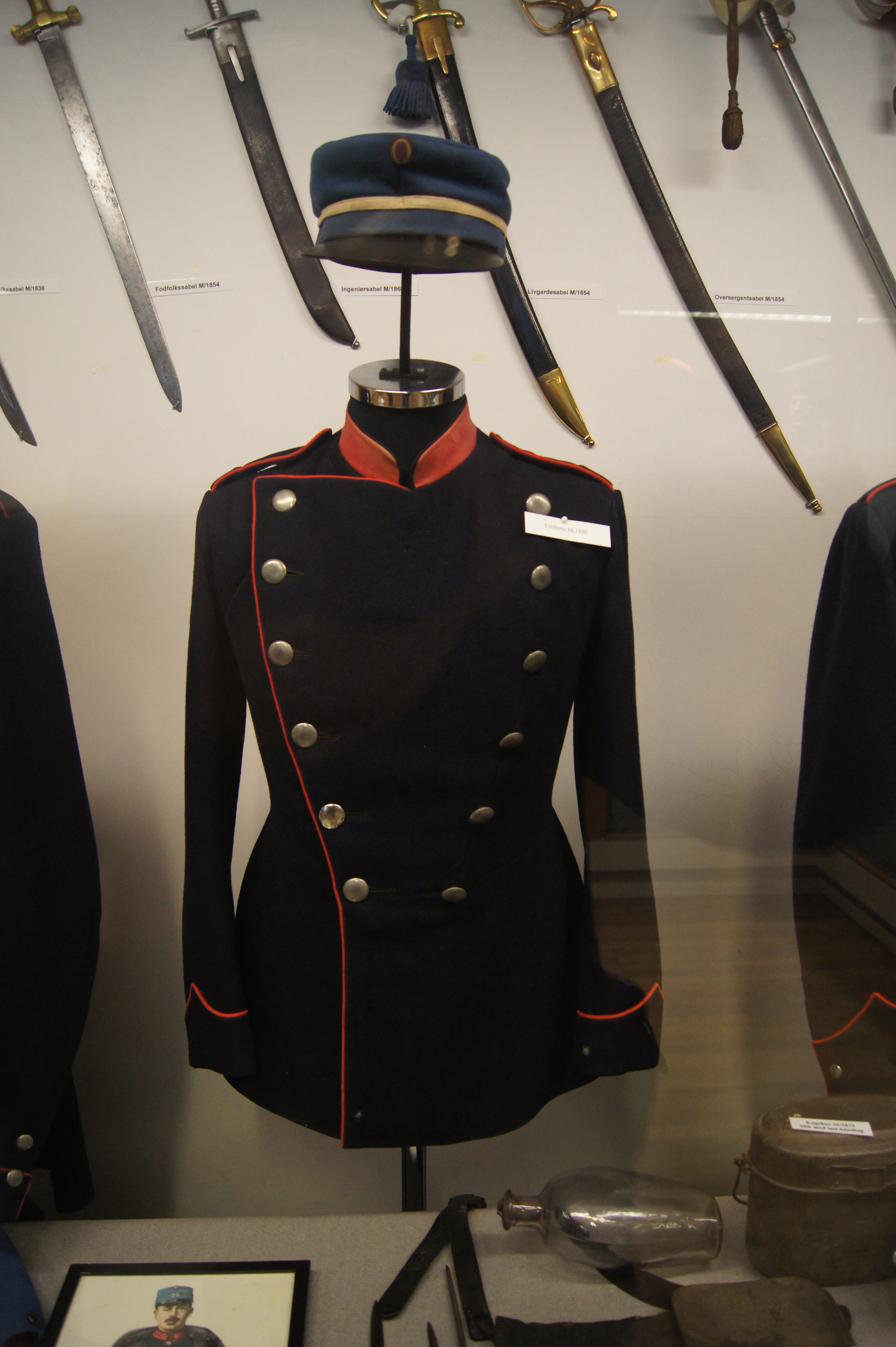
M/1880

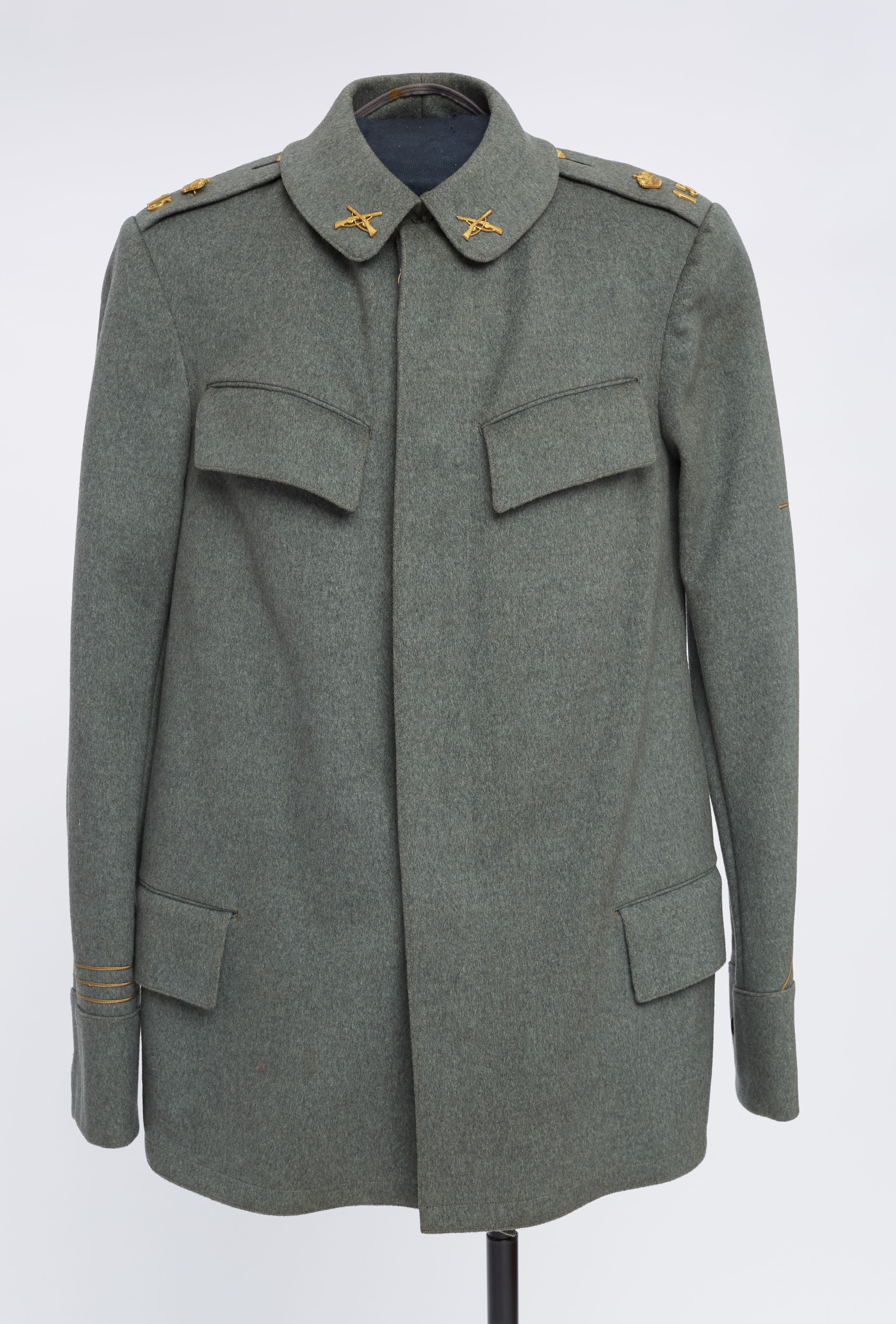
M/1903

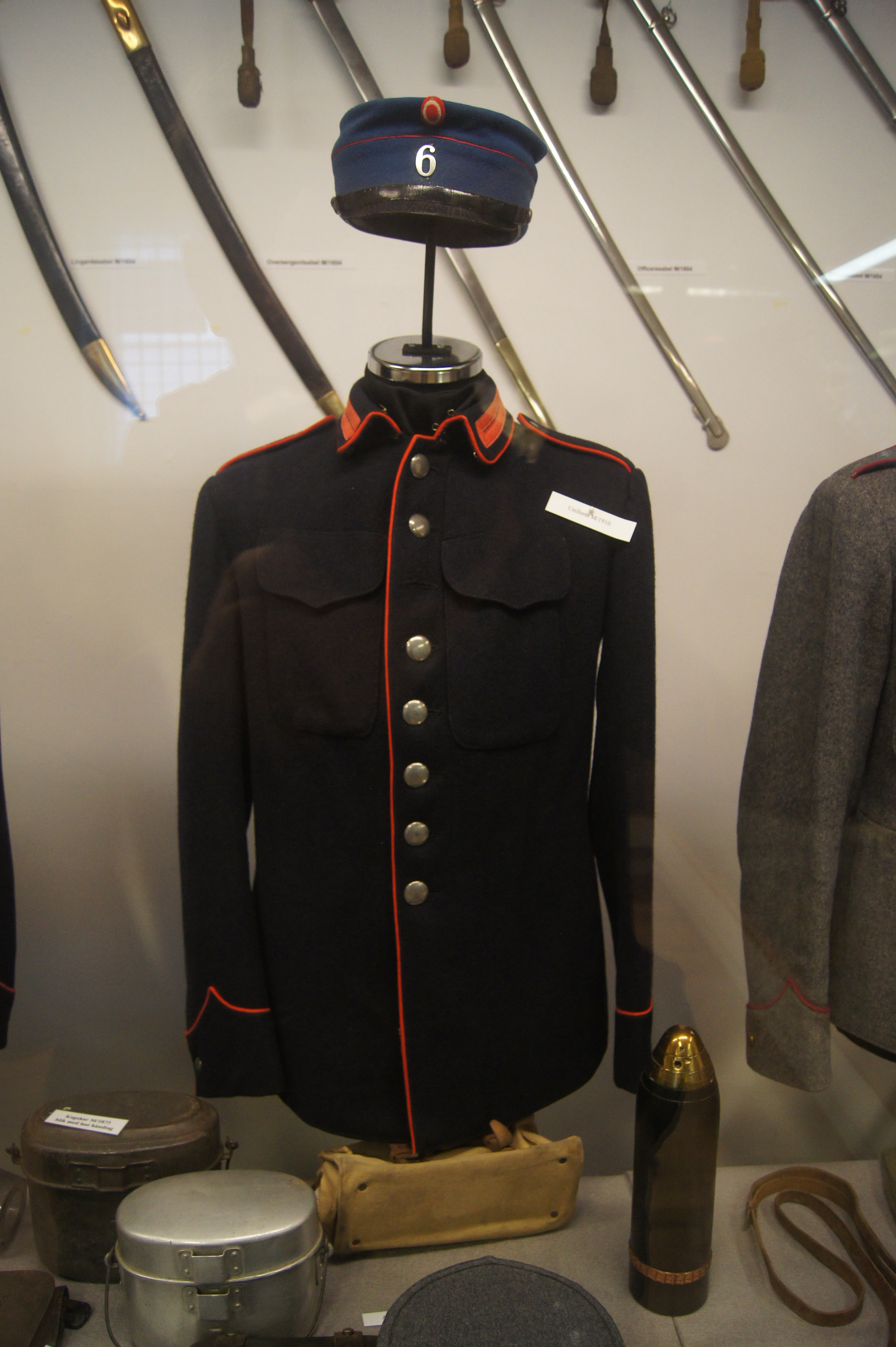
M/1910

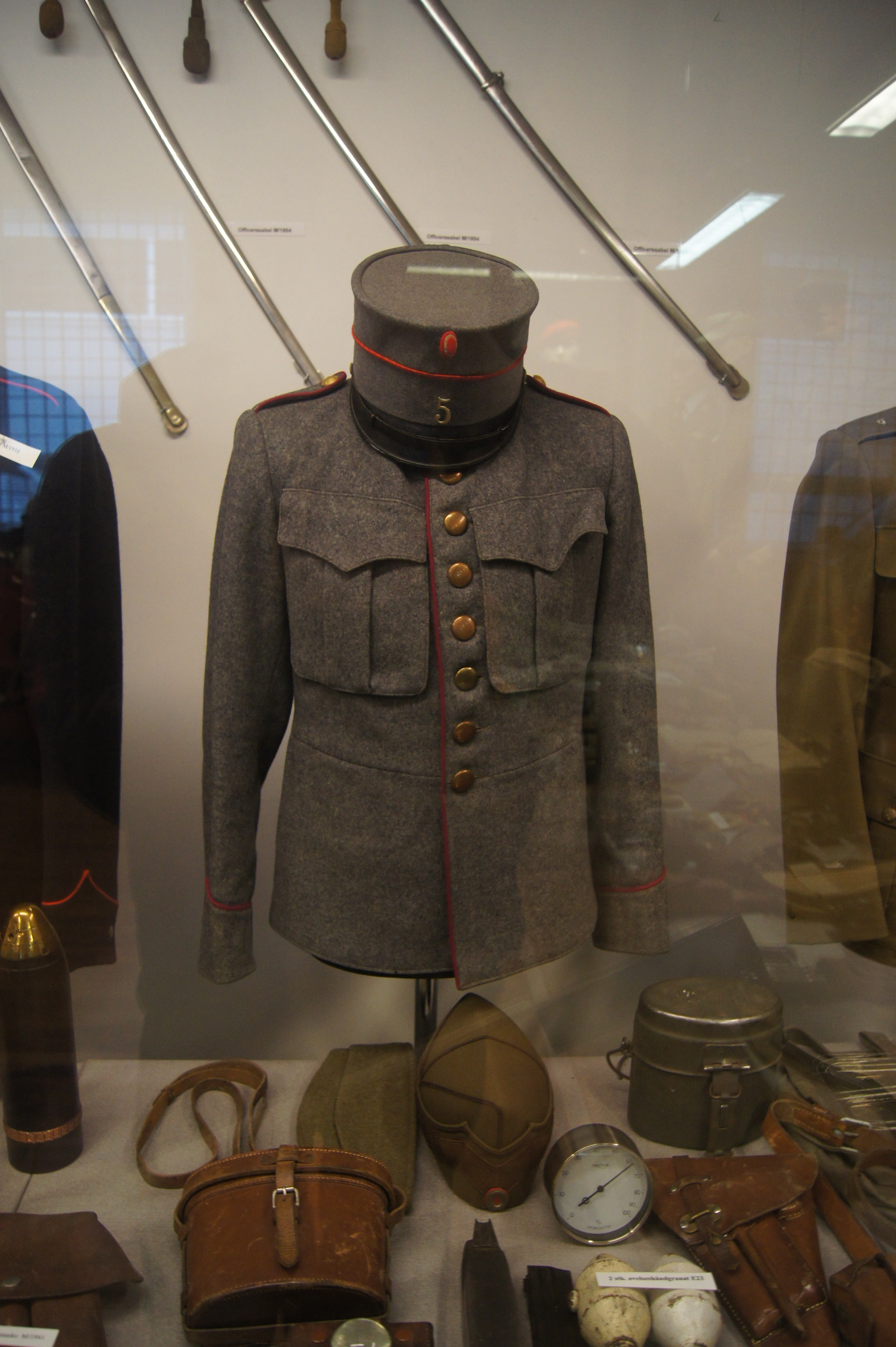
M/1915

=== Modernization ===
Danish 1939 dated M/1923 Reversjakke

Following the end of the WWI, the General Staff learned the M/15 had inadequate camouflage capabilities, leading to the creation of the M/23 uniform. This uniform was similar to the British uniform of the time, and added a Sam Browne belt for the officers. The same year, the M/23 helmet was introduced, meaning the kepi was replaced by a soft side cap with flaps, for enlisted, which was worn when the helmet was not worn.

For officers, a soft peaked cap was introduced. For garrison usage, a hard side cap, with inspiration from the cavalry was introduced. Pips on the collars were also introduced to the officer corps.

While meant for every service of the army, the large stock of blue and grey uniforms created during WWI, meant these had to be worn out before the M/23 could be issued. The uniform was however not completely introduced by World War II, with many soldiers being forced to use the M/15, with only officers having the new uniform.

Following Operation Safari, Danish uniforms were appropriated by the German army. The Danish Army was relegated to the Danish Brigade in Sweden, where the received equipment from the British and Swedish. This meant that the Danes would wear the British Battledress as the combat uniform, which was called the M/44. To replace the aging M/23 officers uniform, the M/47 was introduced. This uniform was based around the design of the older M/23 and retained the same insignia, however, with a "turned-down" collar. The result of the "turned-down" collar also meant, that the four-pointed stars, which had previously signified personnel of the officer class, was replaced with the emblem of the regiment introduced at the same time. The peaked cap of the M/23 uniform was retained, with more ornaments and renamed M/52. In 1946, Denmark introduced a new steel helmet, which had the shell of the M1 helmet, but interior of the Mk III helmet. It was however cheaper to just buy the American helmet, which was named M/48 for Danish use. The equipment for the uniform had mixed elements of American, British and Danish origin.

The M/44, was ineffective against the elements and received many complaints from the soldiers, this led the army to introduce the M/58 combat uniform. The M/58 combat uniform was very similar to the contemporary US counterpart. The new uniform was designed in such as way, that rank insignia had to be sown on, rather than shoulder straps. The M/58, was not deemed appropriate for walking-out, which meant that enlisted was forced to wear older the M/44. The following year, the garrison uniform (M/59) was introduced for enlisted soldiers. The introduction also meant that the beret was introduced to the army, and the side cap was mostly phased out. In 1961, the M/58 uniform colour was changed from khaki to olive green, furthermore the fabric was changed to a thinker version and shoulder straps were reintroduced. The same year, the M/61 summer service uniform was first introduced to soldiers stationed with UNFICYP.

Uniforms
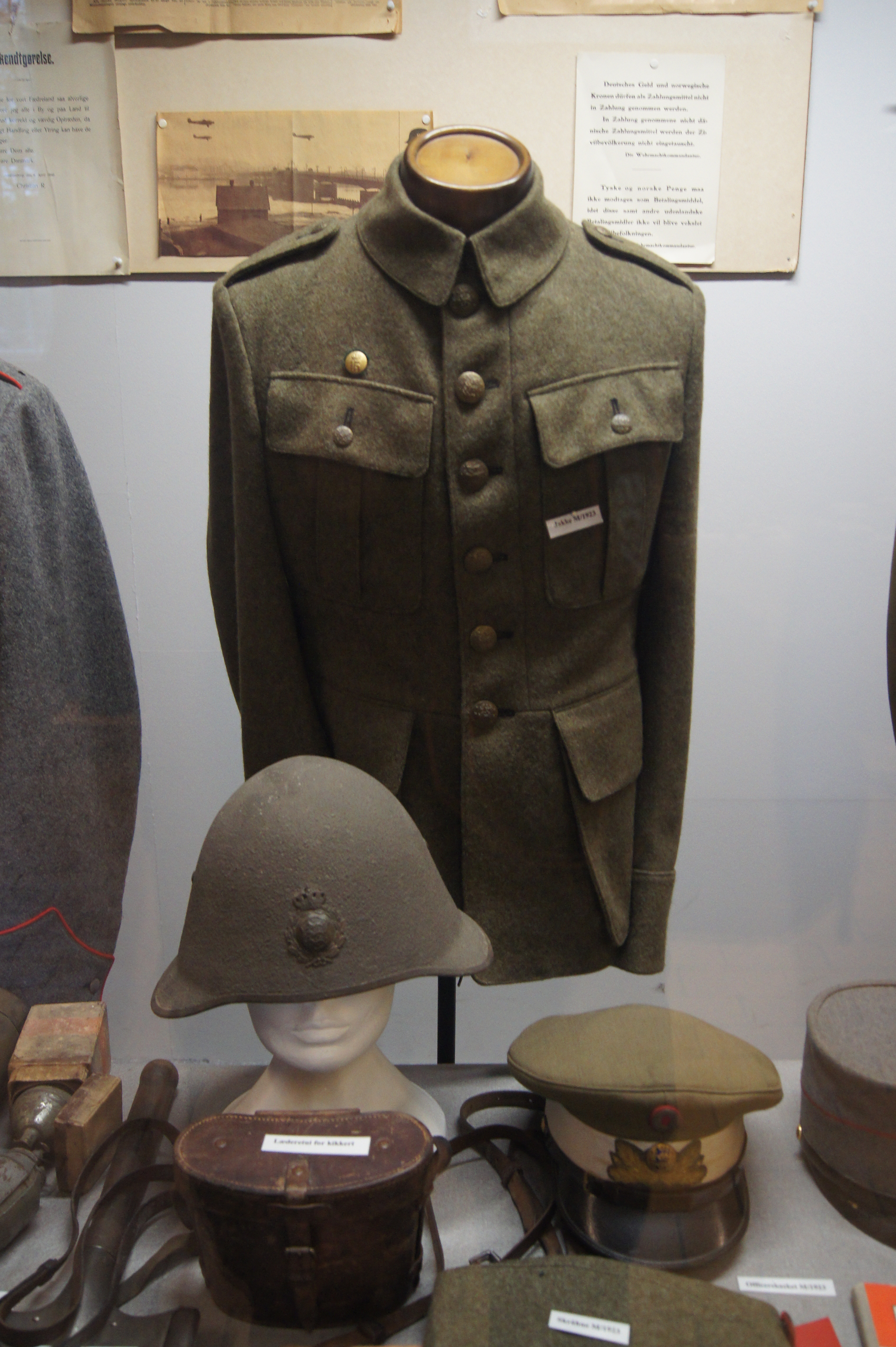
M/23
Enlisted

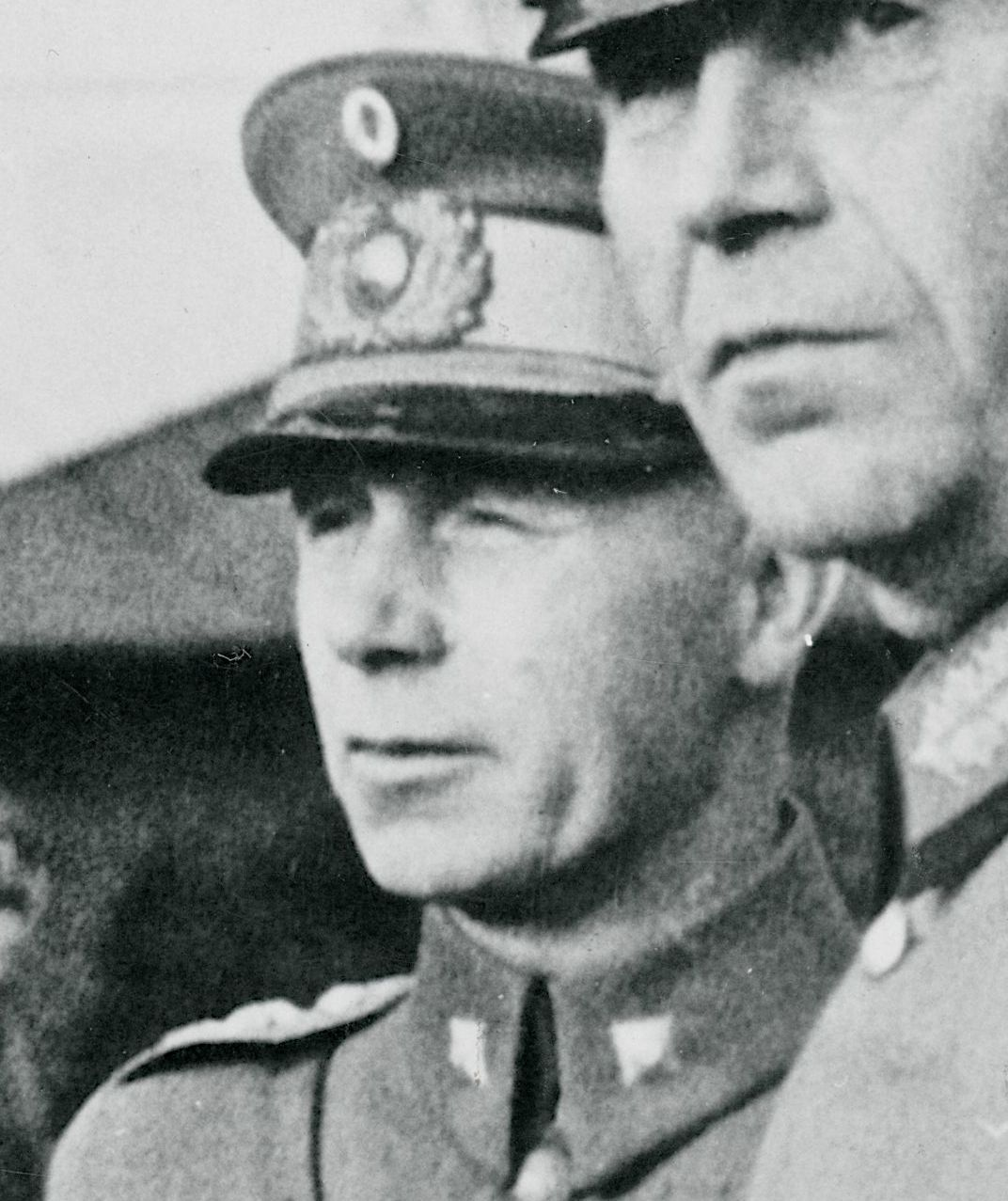
M/23
Officers

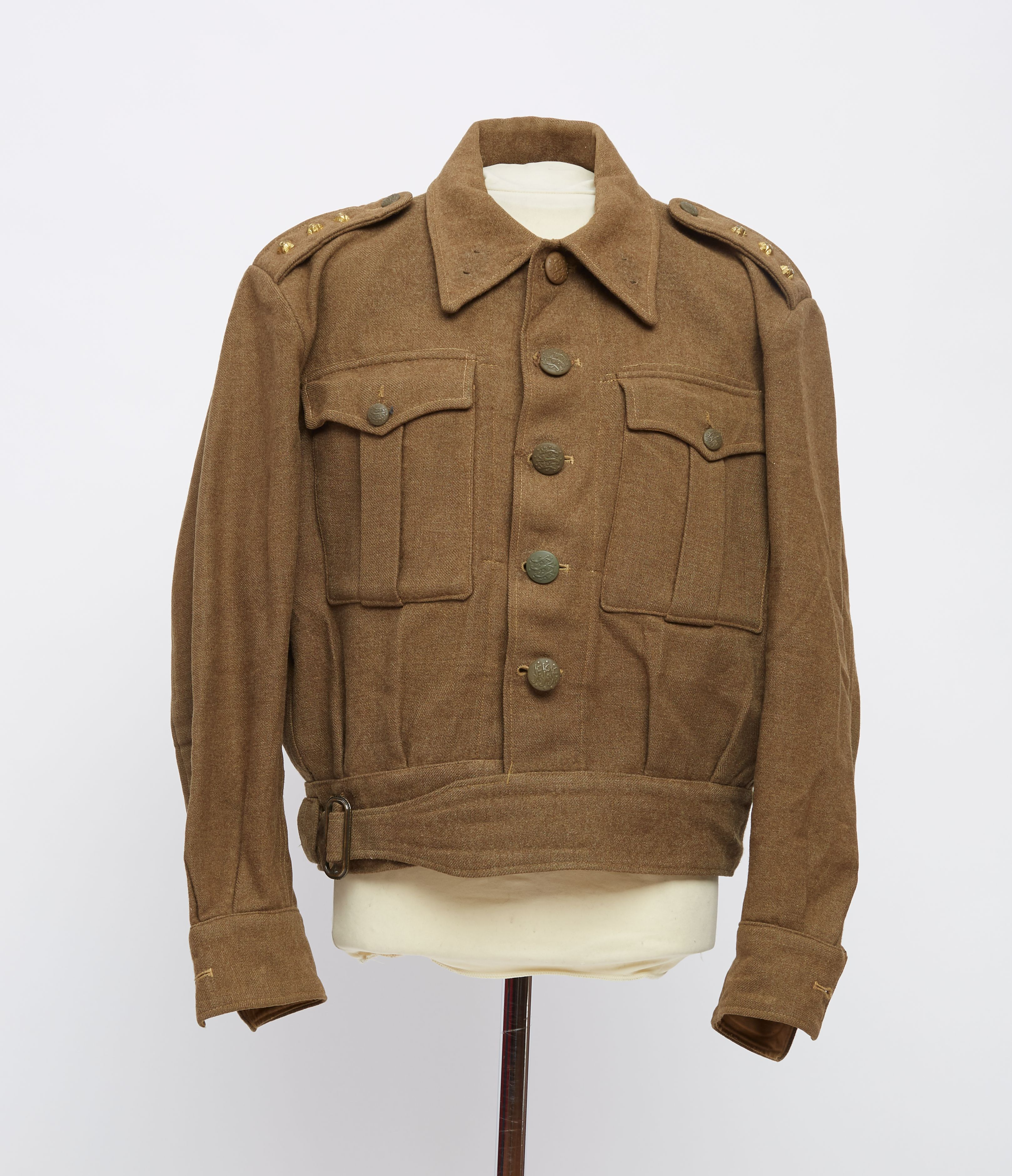
M/44

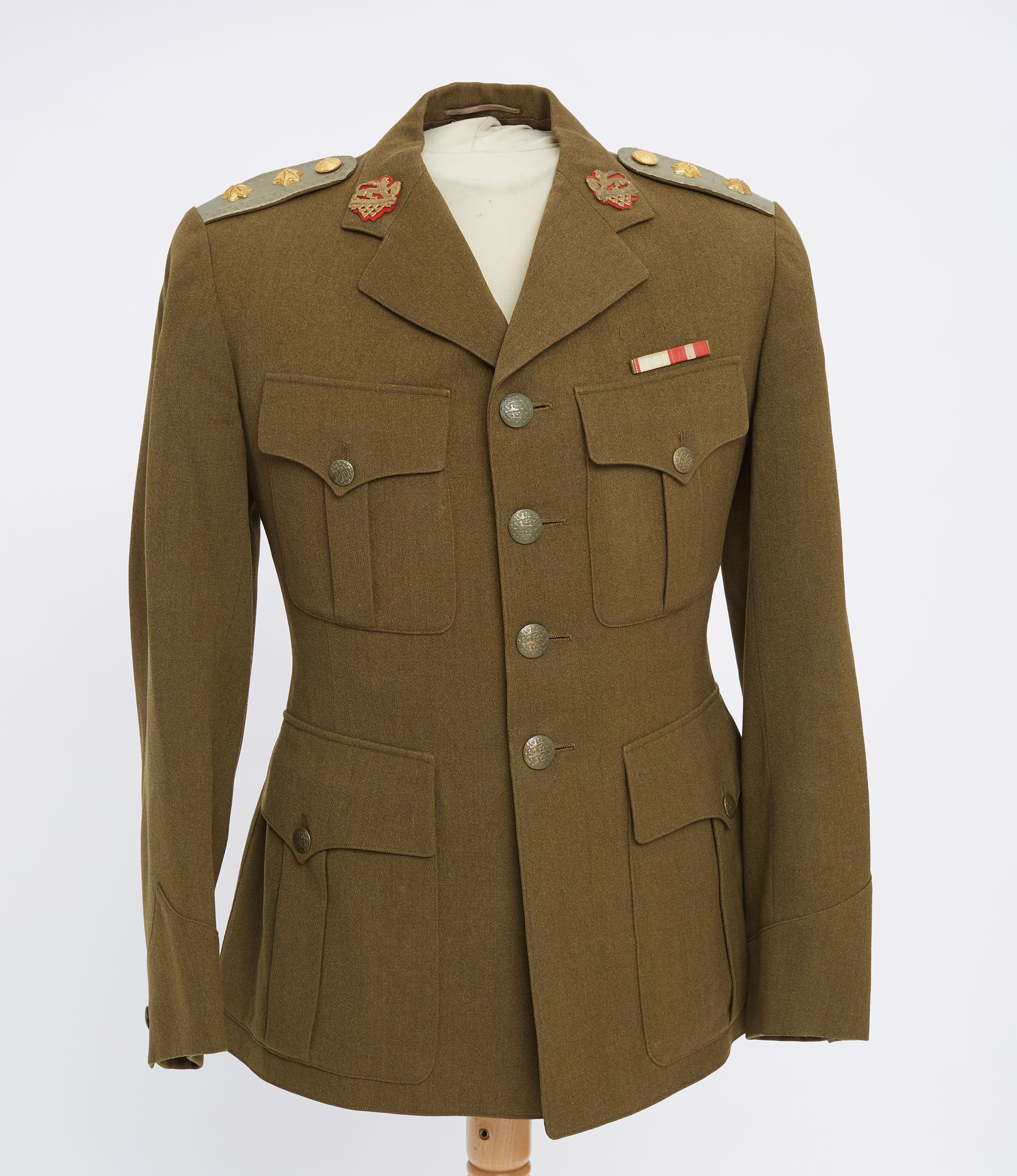
M/47

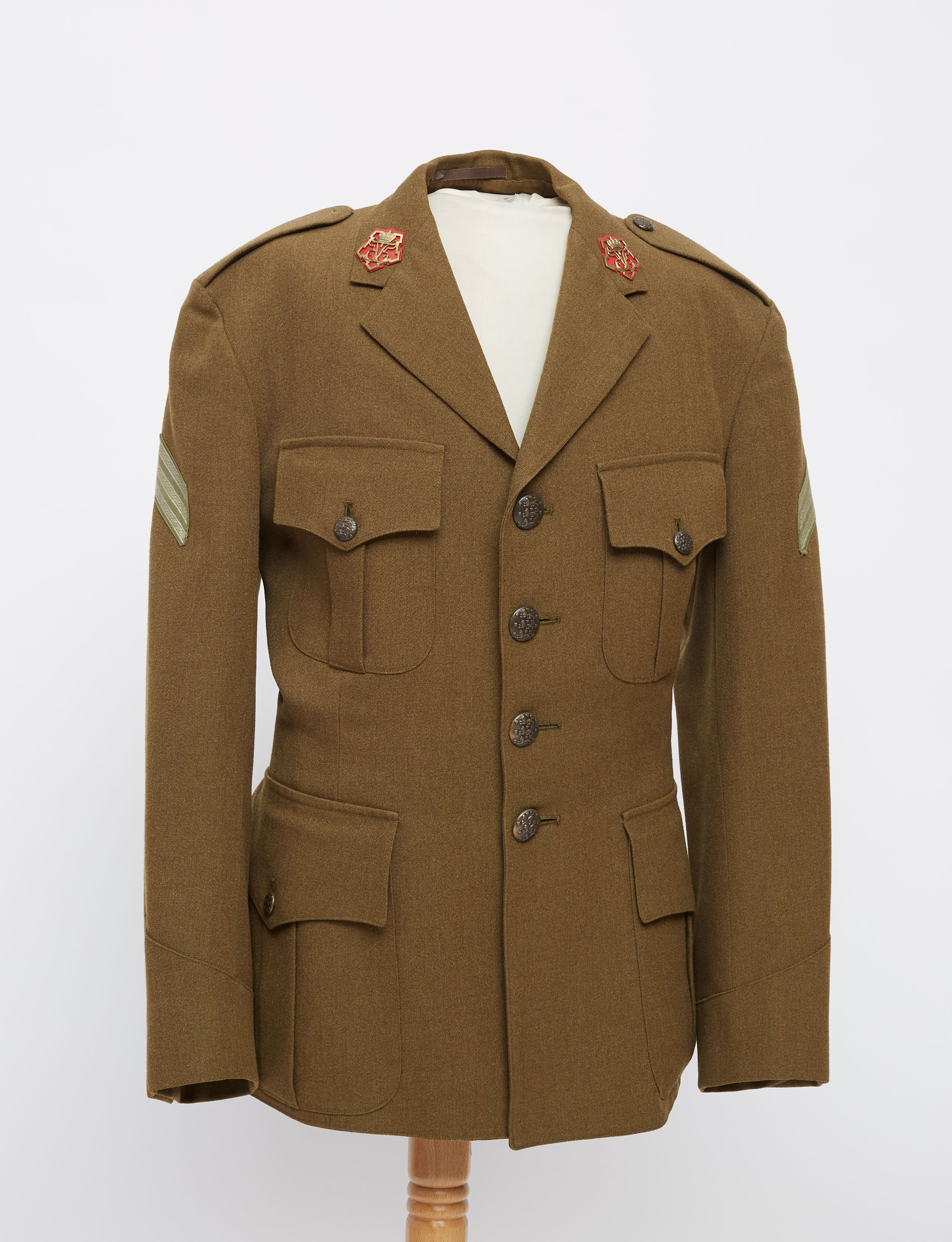
M/59

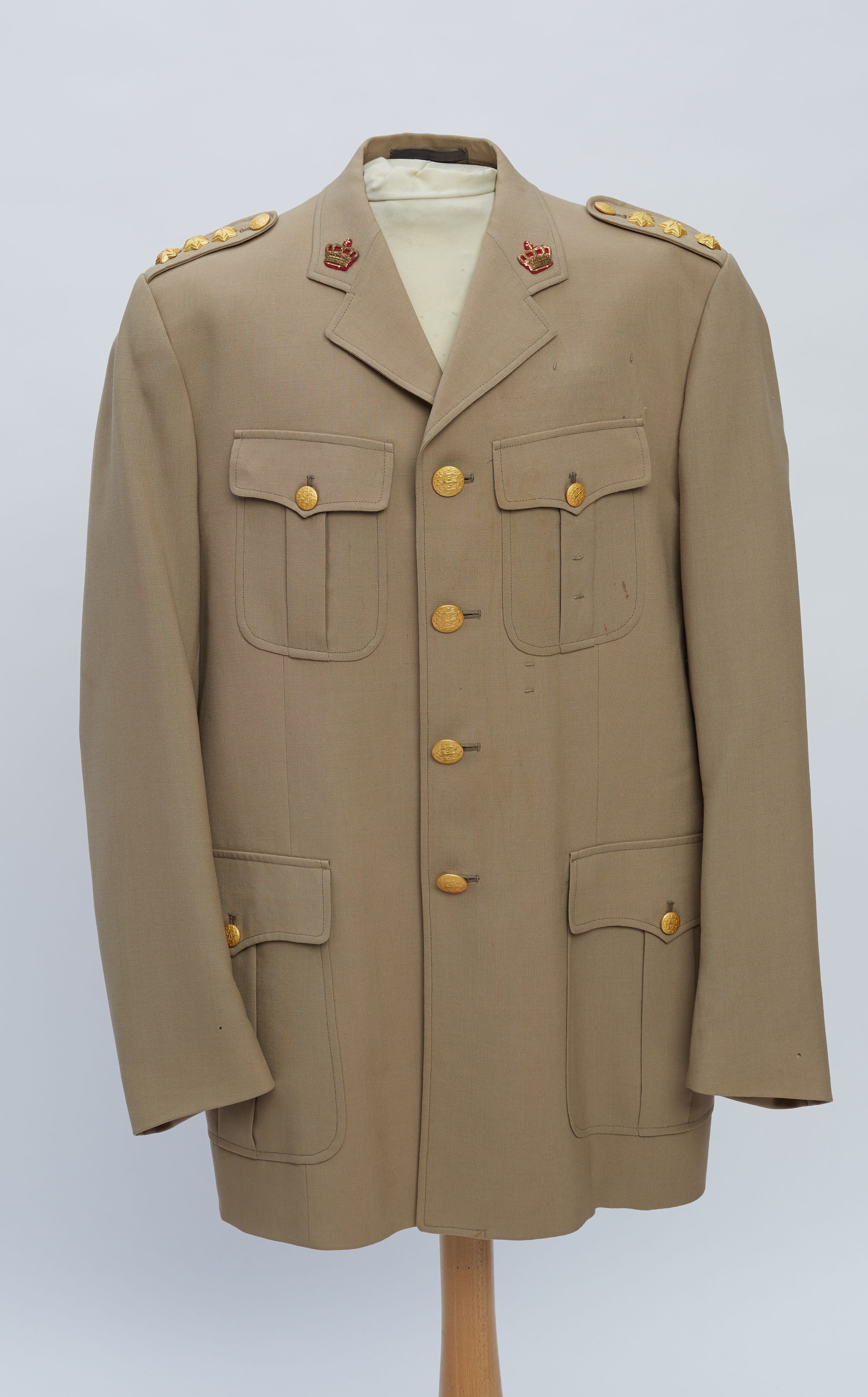
M/61

=== M/84 ===
The army had previously talked about adopting a camouflaged uniform compared to the single coloured M/58, however without reaching any agreements, as the single colour of the M/58 proved to be more effective in the Danish environment at distances of more than 300m. During a joint military exercise in Germany, it was reported that the M/58 uniforms were significantly more visible through Night vision than other nations. The Army Materiel Command and Danish Defence Research Service therefore began to research a new uniform in 1977, with special focus on making it less visible to the naked eye and night vision. The new uniform, first introduced in 1984, utilized M/84 camouflage pattern, which was a derivative of the Flecktarn B pattern specialized for the Danish environment. The uniform, also named M/84, became both the standard barrack dress and combat uniform for all branches. The new uniform, was created with the aim of creating a connected uniform system, rather than previous uniforms, which had elements from different periods. Originally, the shirt issued with the uniform served as both a combat and barracks shirt. However, this was changed in 1989, with the introduction of separate combat and barracks shirts. In 2000, an improved rain suit was introduced, replacing the older model, and in 2002 the national shoulder tab was removed and replaced with the national flag.

Combat

The combat uniform initially consisted of a combat jacket and trousers, rainwear in green on the outside and white on the inside, a waterproof Pelerine and a green Ushanka. The M/84 system saw gradual improvements over the years, starting in 1992, when Danish soldiers deployed on international missions were issued the Gefechtshelm M92. Later in 1996, older M/48 helmet was replaced throughout the army with SPECTRA helmet, and the aging M/59 webbing equipment, was replaced with a Danish version of the PLCE 95 pattern, both designated M/96. In 2000, the fragmentationsvest M/00 was added, then Assault Vest (Kampvest M/06) was added, and during the time, the uniform jacket was improved with new pockets and moving the rank insignia to the chest.

Barrack dress

All branches of the Army issued the M/84, it consists of the barrack dress version of the trousers and jacket, a green shirt, beret, and a stable belt in either black or the colours of the regiment. Furthermore, army regiments wear an Ascot tie, for official portraits and ceremonies. Due to the changing weather in Denmark, the shirt can either be short or long sleeved, and there can furthermore be worn a jumper or rain-jacket.

There was also an equestrian version of the M/84, this was only given to HESK and officers of Guard Hussar Regiment as there were still horses in use. The equestrian uniform of M/84 was the same as the M/69 but featured a green shirt in lieu of the service dress uniform.

M/84 Uniforms
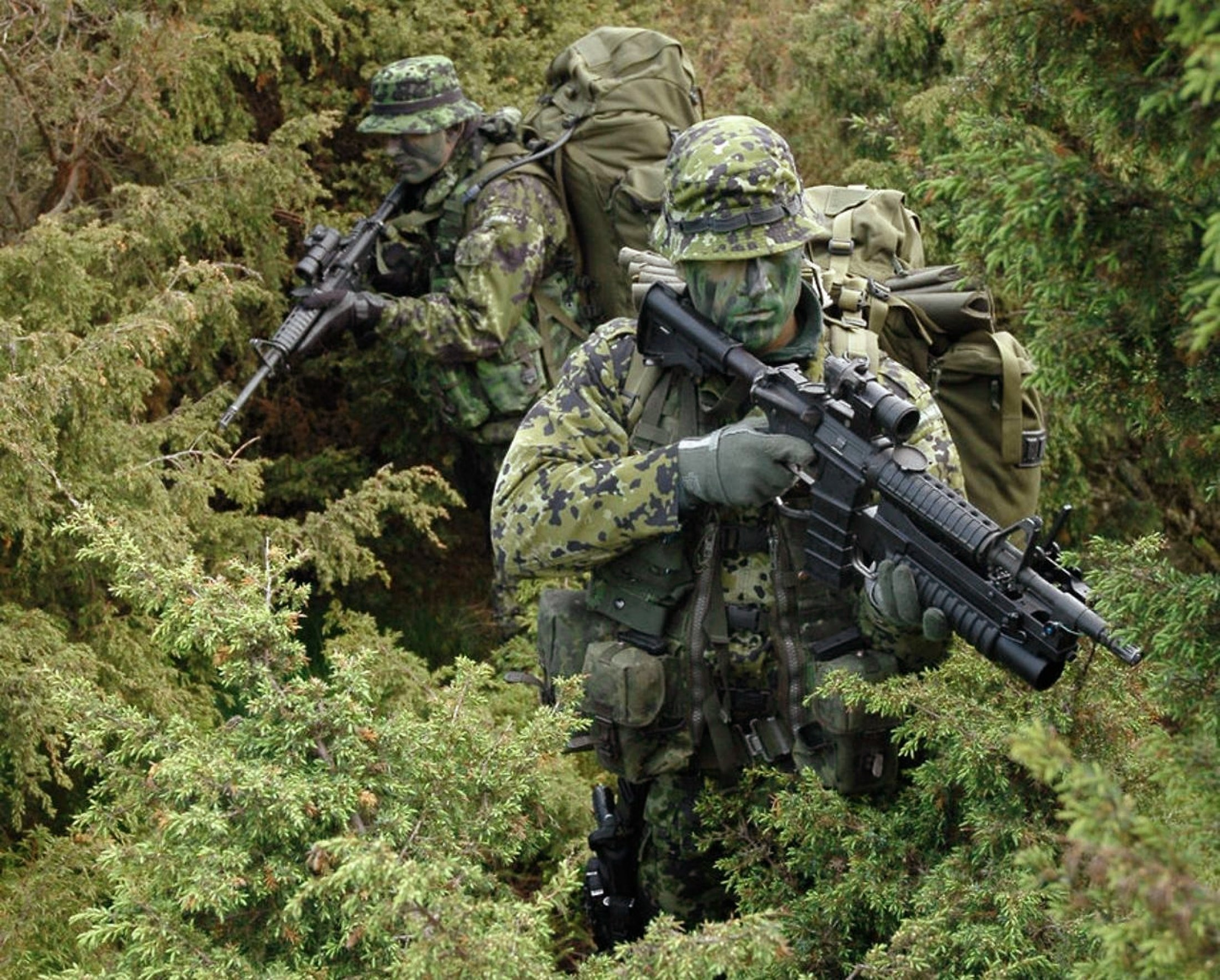
M/84 combat uniform with Boonie hat

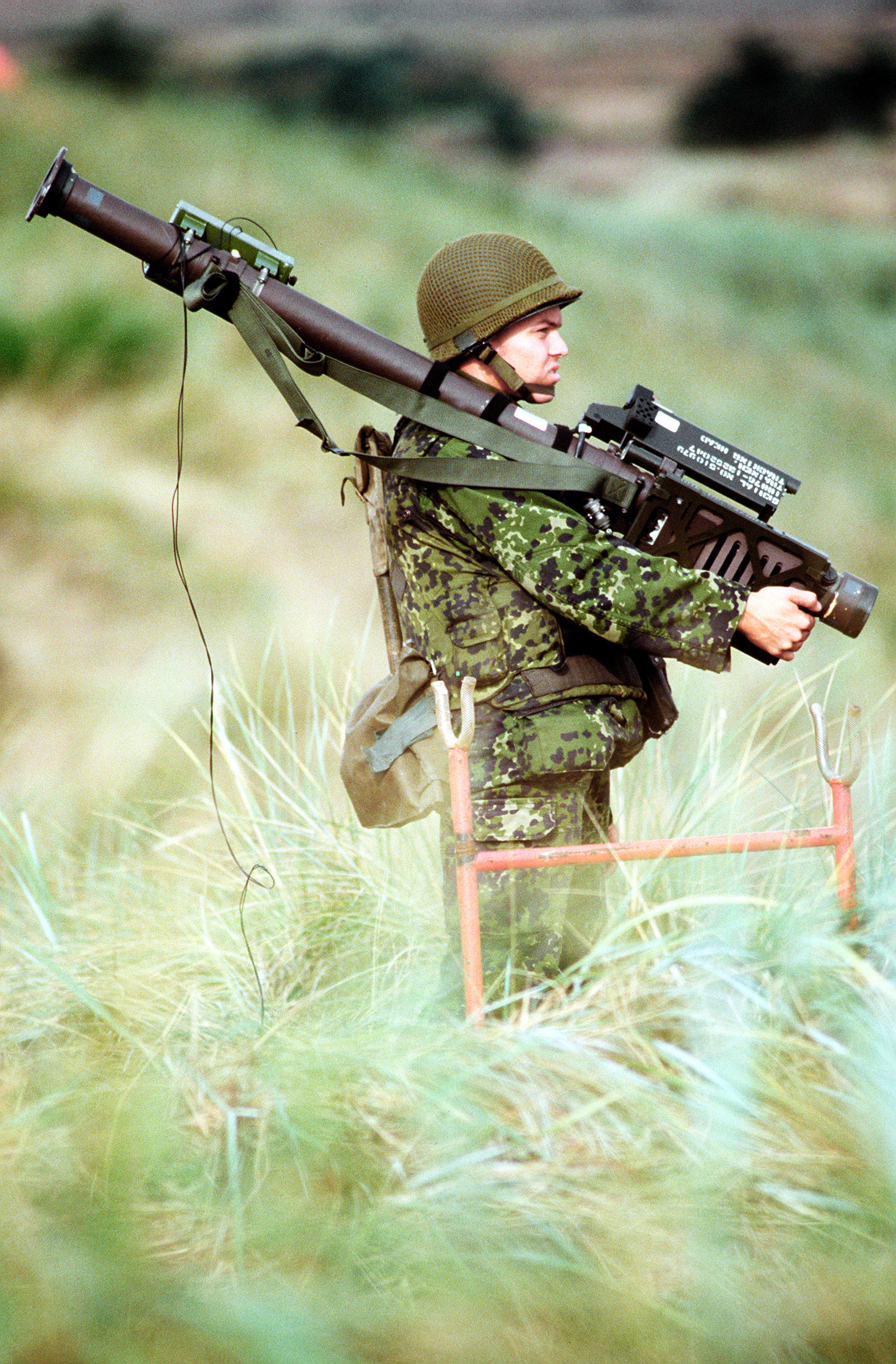
M/84 combat uniform with the M/47 helmet

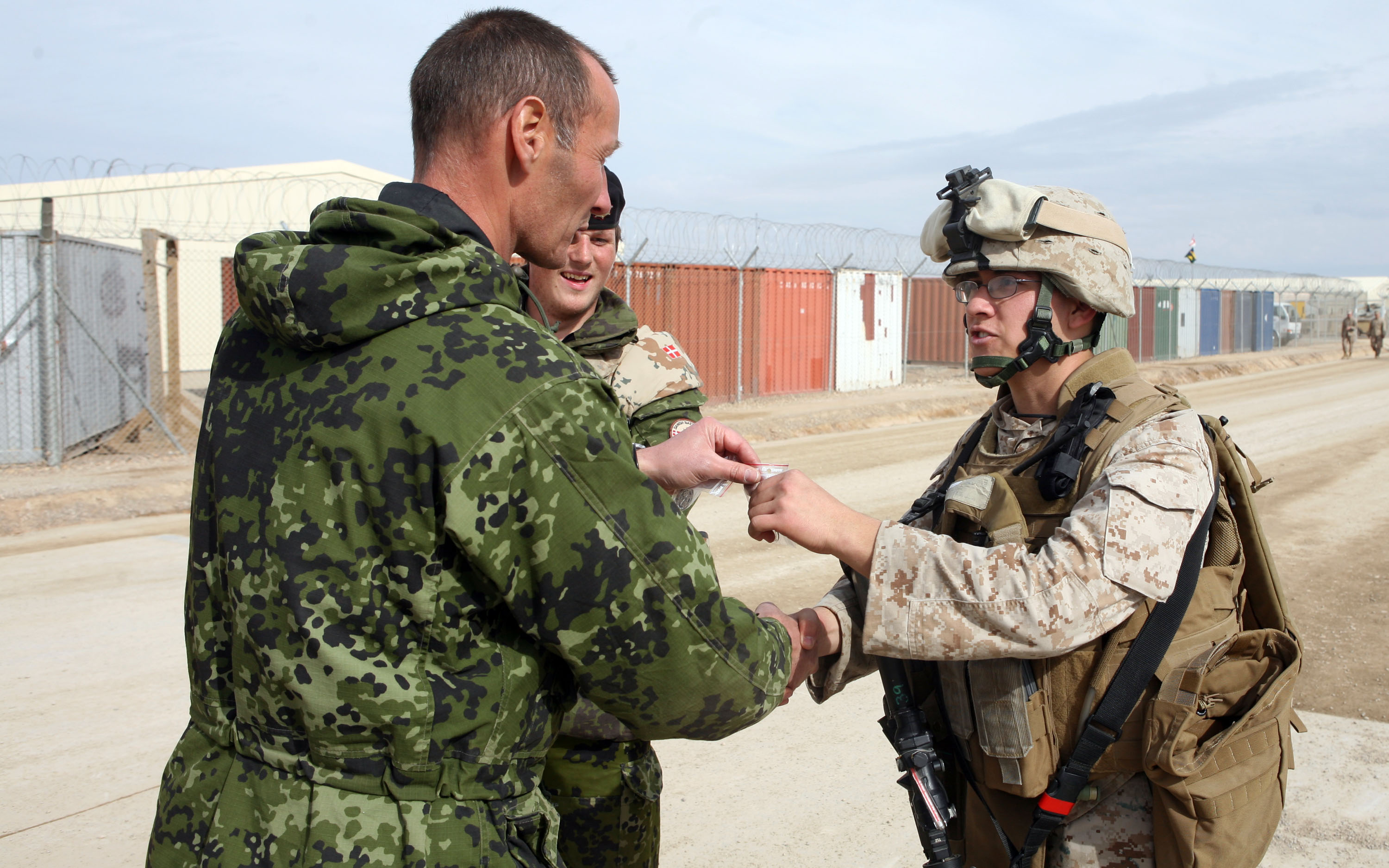
Privately bought M/84 jacket

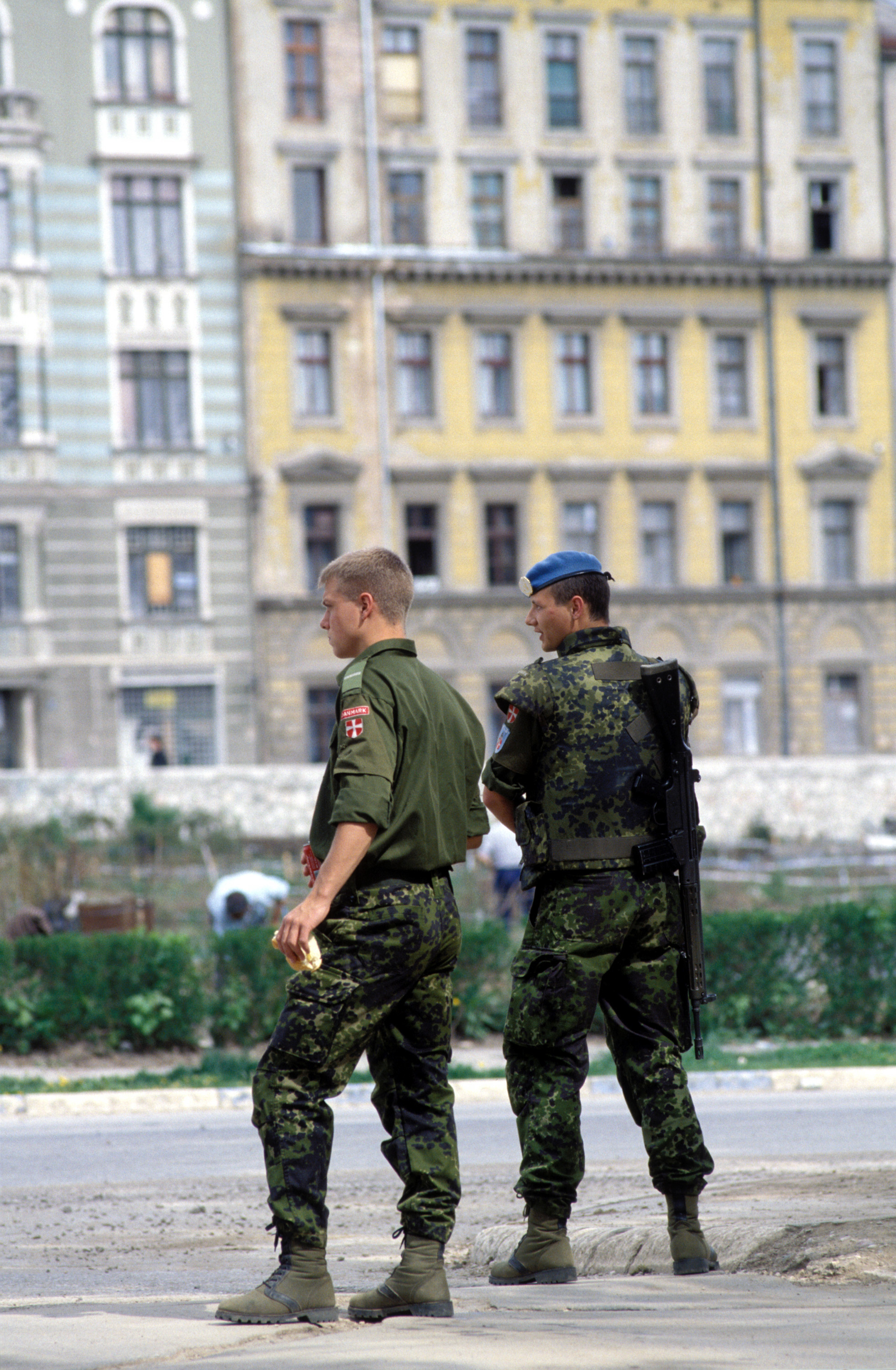
M/84 Barrack dress with shirt and fragmentation vest

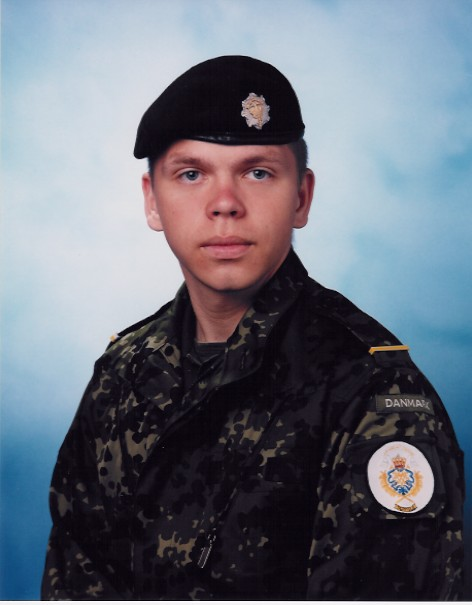
M/84 Barrack dress

M/84 Barrack uniform with Ascot tie

=== M/01 ===
Following deployments to the Balkans, it was discovered that the M/84, made for the Danish environment, was too thick/heavy. Leading the army to create a light Ripstop version of the M/84 (Let Kampuniform). With the deployments to the Middle East, a desert version of the light uniform was introduced, using the M/01 camouflage (Ørken Kampuniform). In 2010, a Combat shirt in M/01 were introduced, to allow soldiers to wear something lighter than the combat jacket. The M/01 uniforms were limited to deployed personnel, and were not given to the army in general. The relative rarity of these 'deployment uniforms', especially the desert version, meant that some of the equipment was not always in stock, forcing many soldiers to use woodland versions.

Uniforms
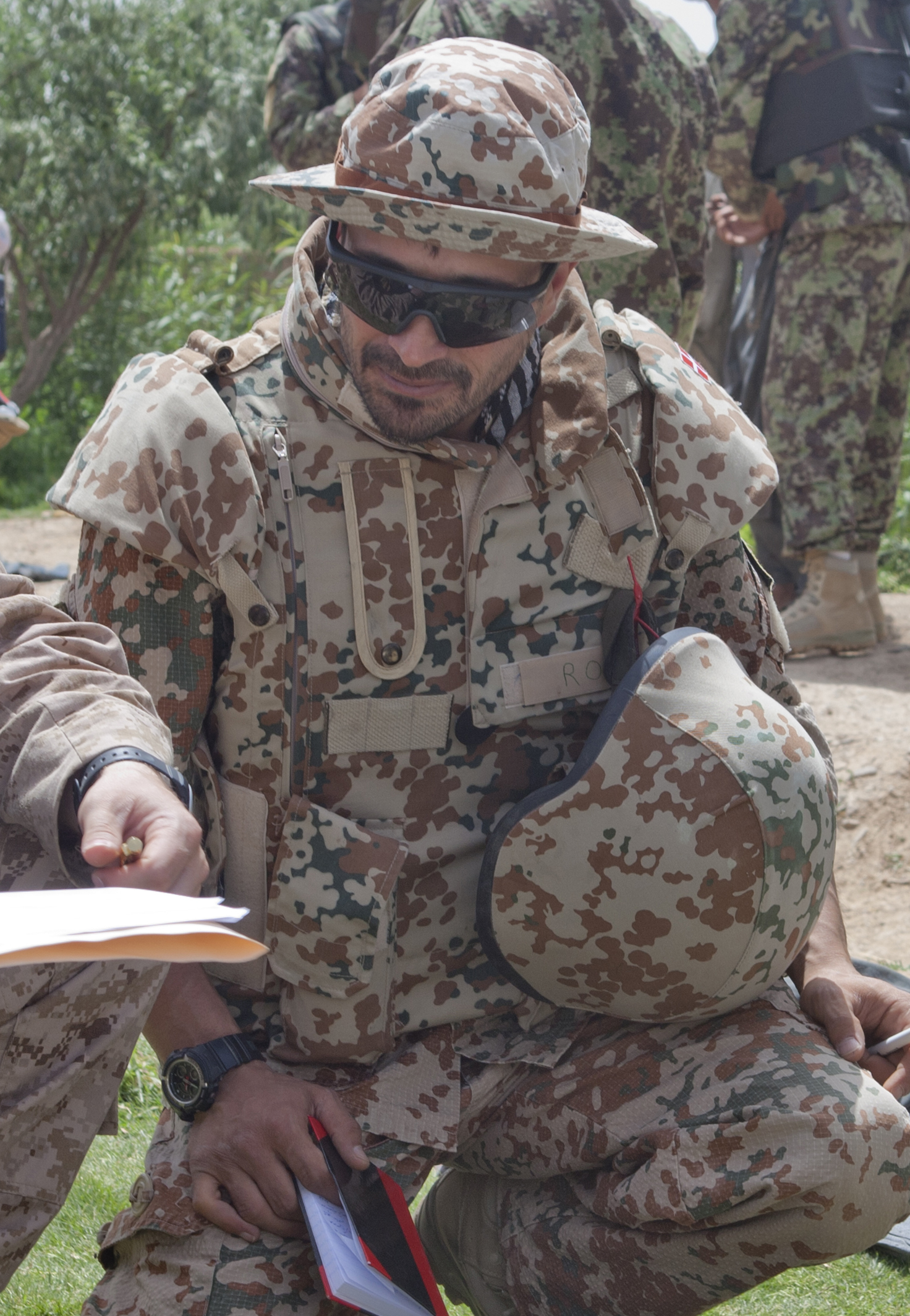
Complete M/01 uniform

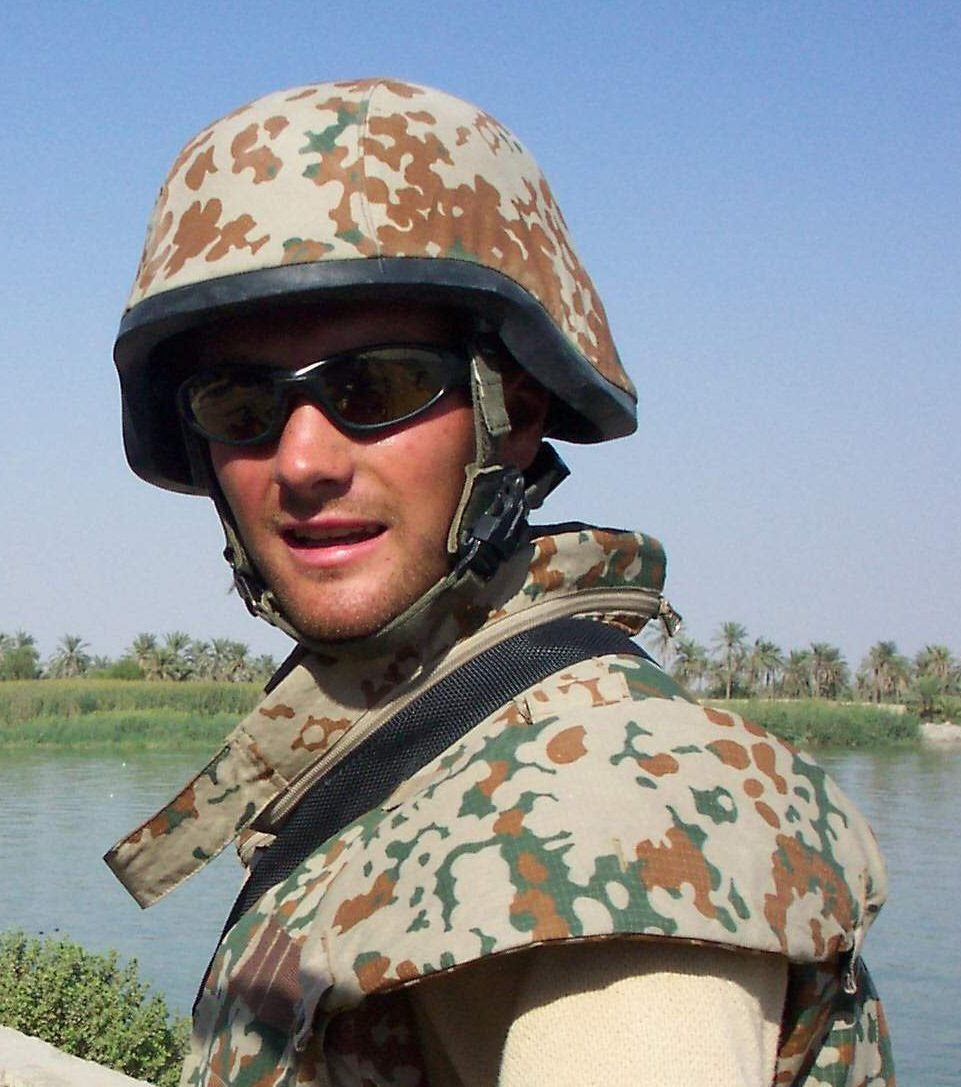
M/01 combat helmet and frag vest

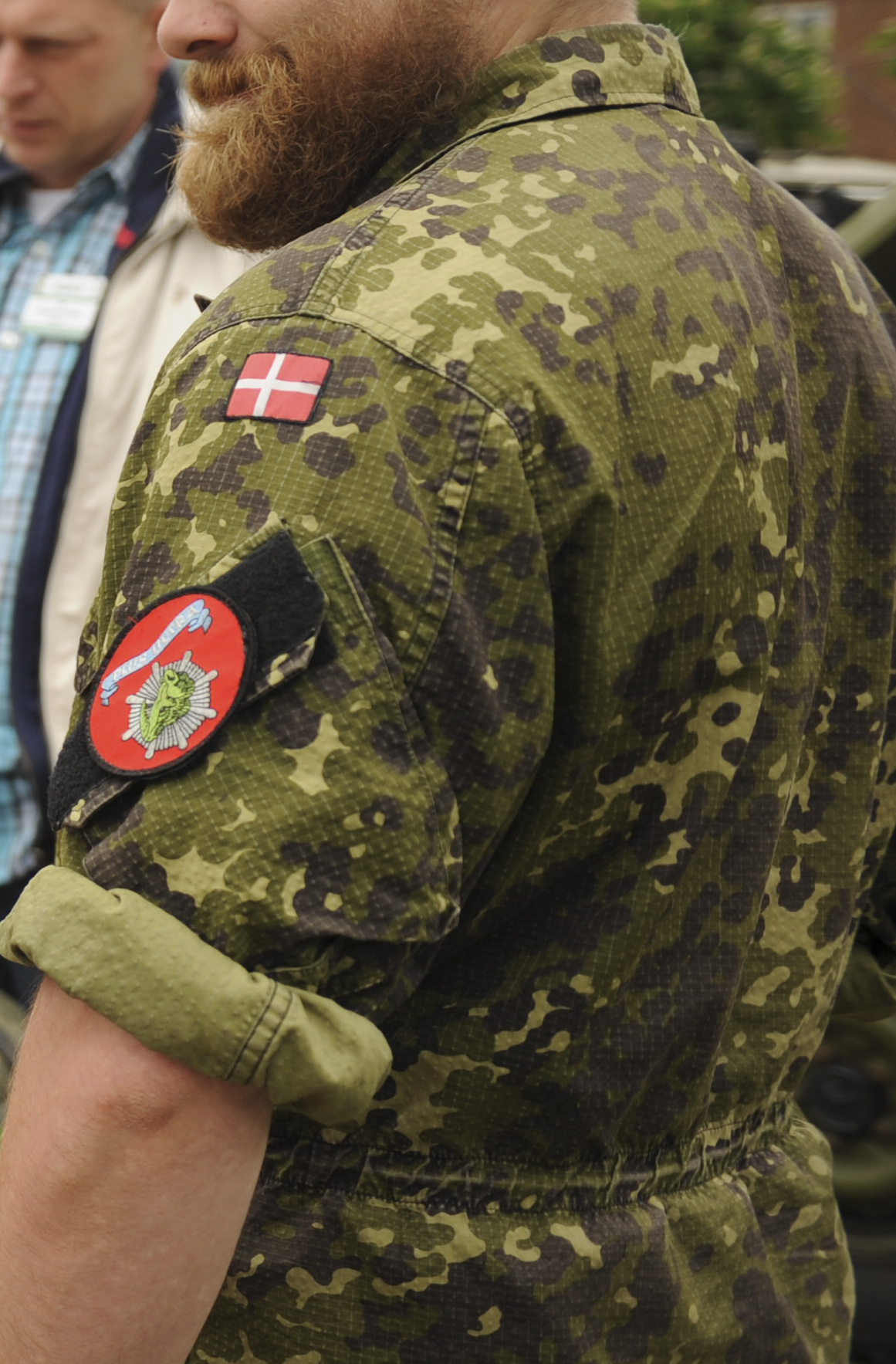
M/01 light combat uniform

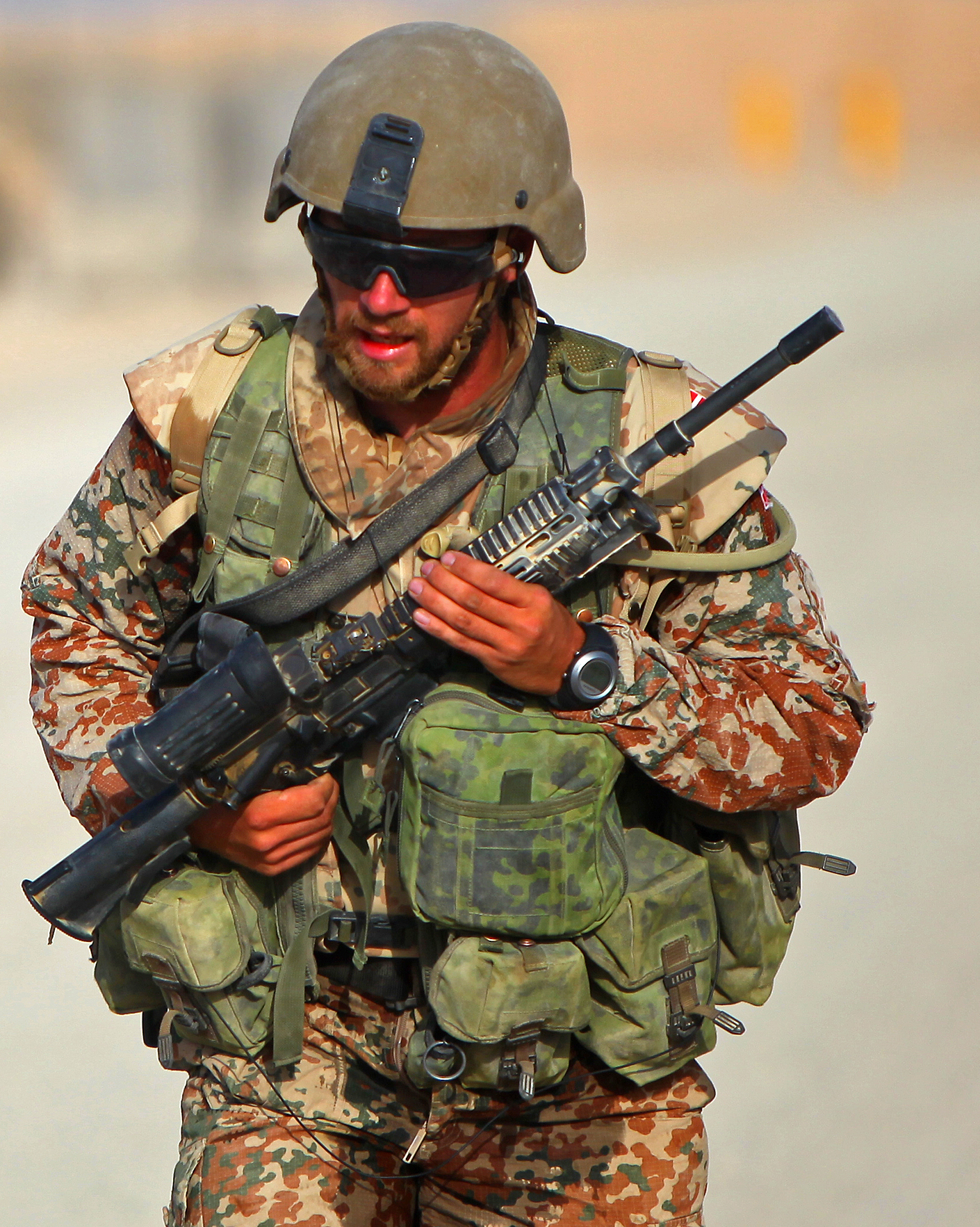
Soldier wearing the M/01 uniform with elements from the M/84

== Current Uniforms ==
=== Full dress ===
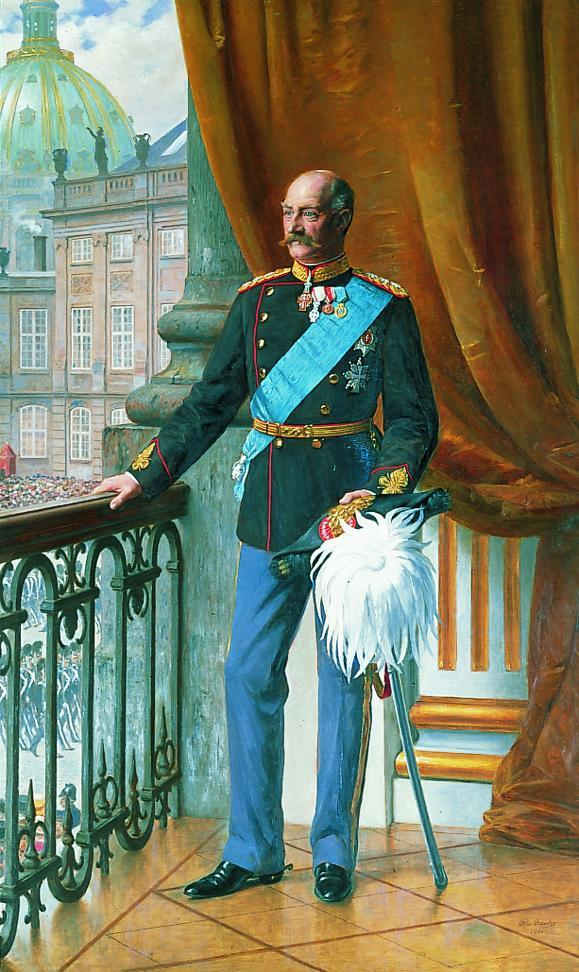
Frederik VIII of Denmark wearing the General full dress uniform

The full dress uniform is the most elaborate and traditional uniform worn by the Royal Danish Army. All ceremonial dresses apart from the Guard Hussar Regiment's and Royal Life Guards', can be traced back to the standardization in 1848, where all services were given coats in the same cut. With these coats, the infantry, engineers and artillery wore dark blue coats while the cavalry wore light blue. The uniforms are however, less common today, as it was withdrawn from general issue in 1964, when it was no longer compulsory for officers to own a full dress uniform. However, personnel serving as aide-de-camp to the Monarch, Generals, the Judge Advocate General and the Commandant of Copenhagen are required to own a full dress uniform.

The officer corps of the different services have retained their ceremonial dress uniforms. It is however only used for balls or audiences with the monarch. The uniform has a choker-style collar and is worn with a Kepi. The generals' full dress M/1880, is more elaborate than officers' with gold ornamentation and is worn with a bicorne with feathers.

Uniforms
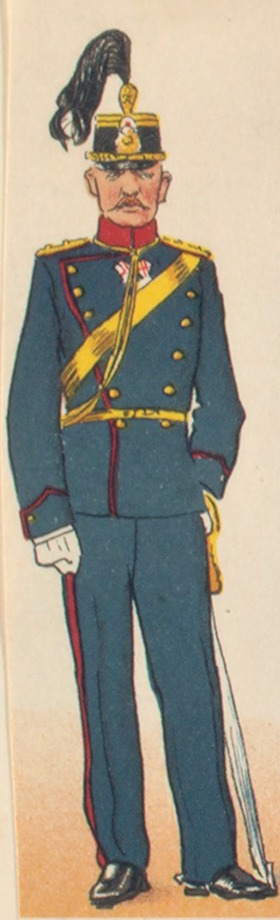
Officer uniform for the Artillery

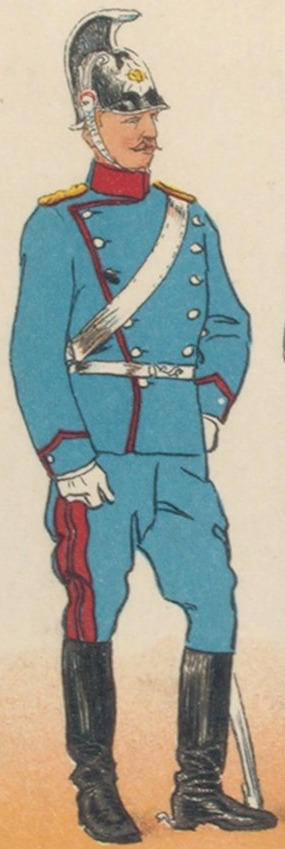
Officer uniform for the Dragoons

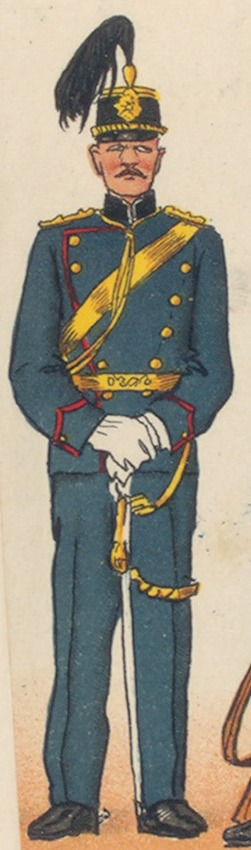
Officer uniform for the Engineers

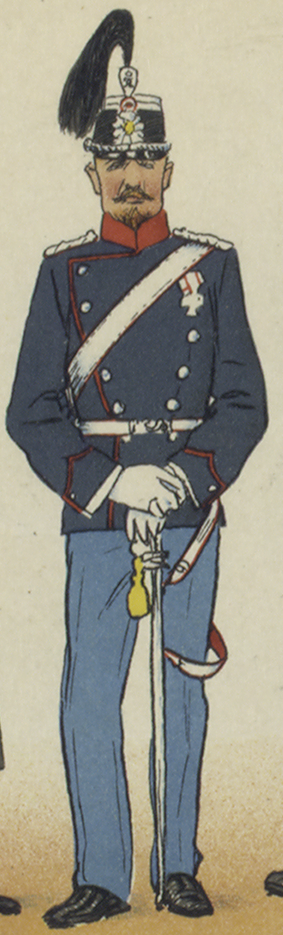
Officer uniform for the Infantry

==== Hussar ====
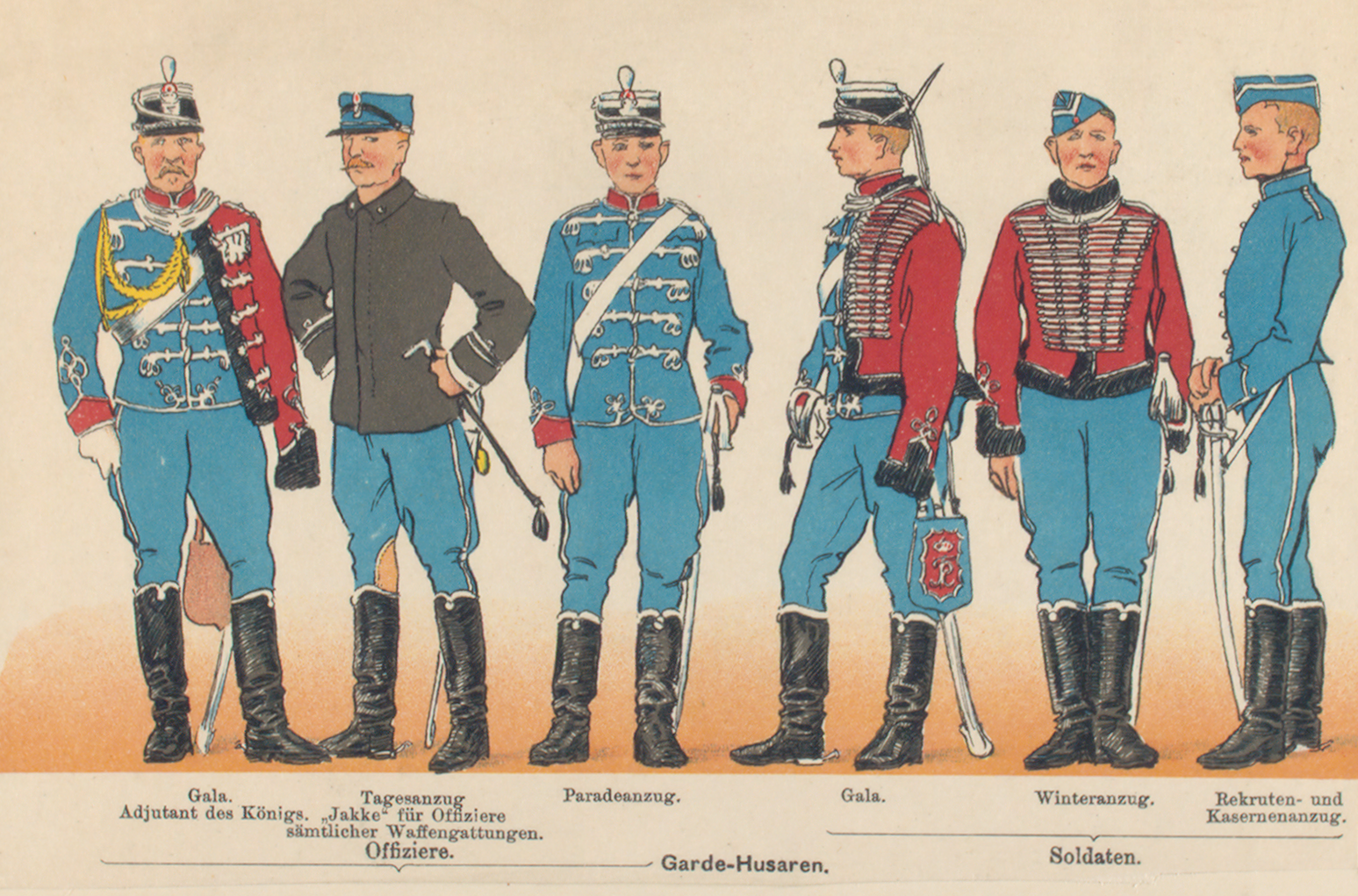
Different types of hussar uniforms

The hussar uniform is only worn by the Mounted Squadron and officers of the hussar regiment on ceremonial occasions. The first hussars in Denmark, were Austrian mercenaries who worn their own national uniforms. With the creation of Denmark's own hussar regiment in 1762, the first version of the uniform was introduced, and has remained practically unchanged since 1870. Due to this fact, the uniform contains a pelisse and a sabretache, which is not found in any other uniform in the world.

The blue dolman was introduced with the creation of the regiment in 1762, and saw a number of small changes, before being replaced with a simplified version, having fewer braids across the chest in 1870.

The red pelisse was introduced in 1762, and was originally meant to protect the hussar from sabre cuts. The pelisse is worn over the left shoulder and exists in two different colours, Cardinal red for officers and crimson red for NCOs and enlisted. The difference in colour can be traced back to 1870, when the new dolman was introduced and the pelisse was removed from the uniform. Edward, Prince of Wales, being a big fan of the Danish hussar uniform, suggested to allow officers to continue wearing the pelisse, as they had to buy them privately in either case. The older model from before 1870, was from this point given to the NCOs and privates to be used until they were worn out. The NCO pelisse are said to still being "worn out" till this day. Both versions of the pelisse are provided with lanyards (called mantequets) used for holding the pelisse in place.

The current light blue breeches with a white stripe along the outseam were introduced in 1822. The original pants in 1762 were also light blue, but between 1774 and 1822 different colors were used, yellow were however most common.

The uniforms still possess the sabretache which is in the colours of the regiment, with the royal monogram. It is the only uniform in the world to still use it, and has been in use since the reign of Frederick V.

In the beginning the hussars would wear a Flügelmütze, however, by 1774 it was replaced by a tall shako. The modern shako is significantly shorter and is worn with a cordon and pompom made of tail hairs for NCOs and enlisted, officers have white buffalo hair. There are two colours of pompoms, red for the buglers in the drum and bugle corps, while the rest have white.

Uniforms
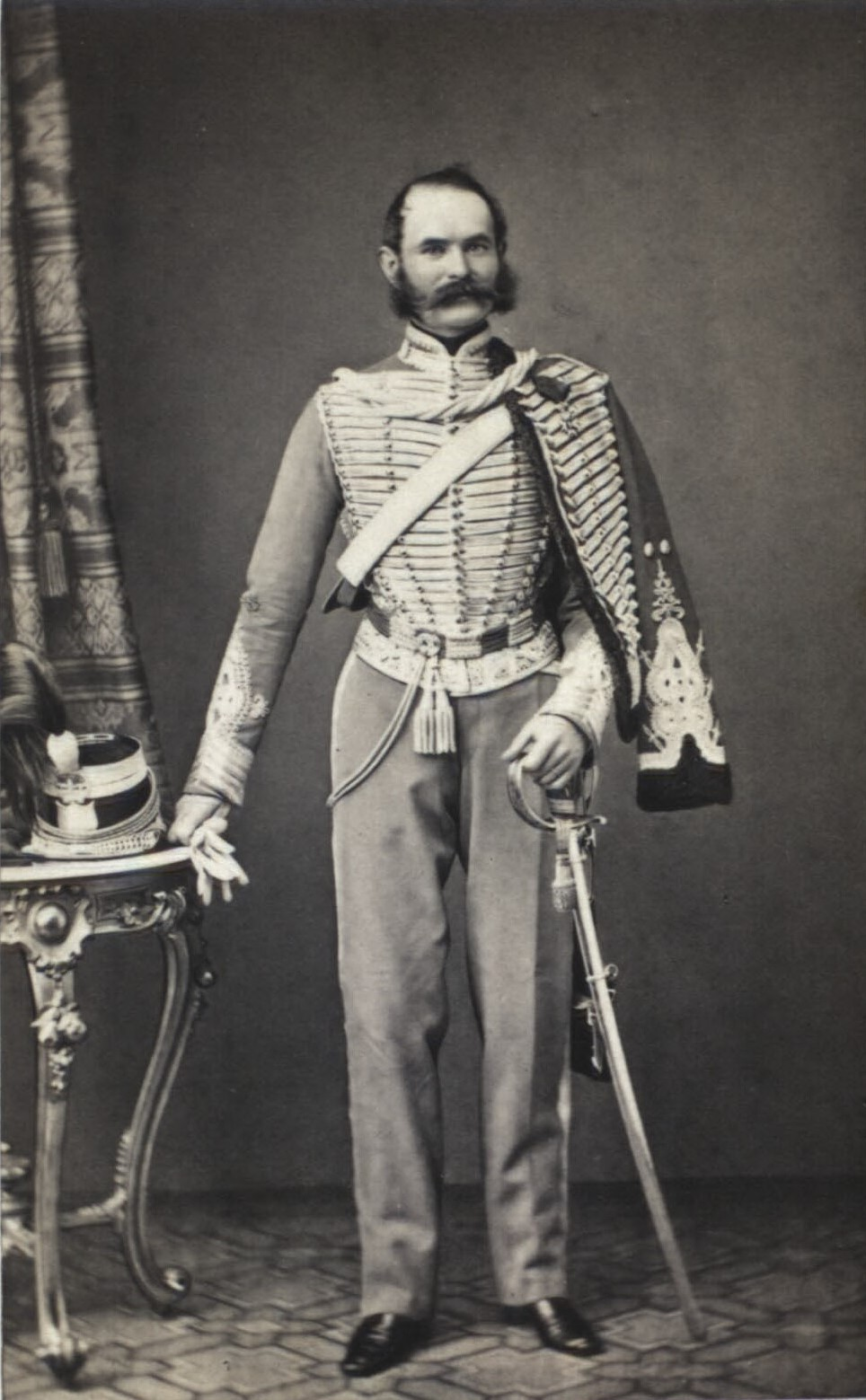
Pre-1870 officer uniform

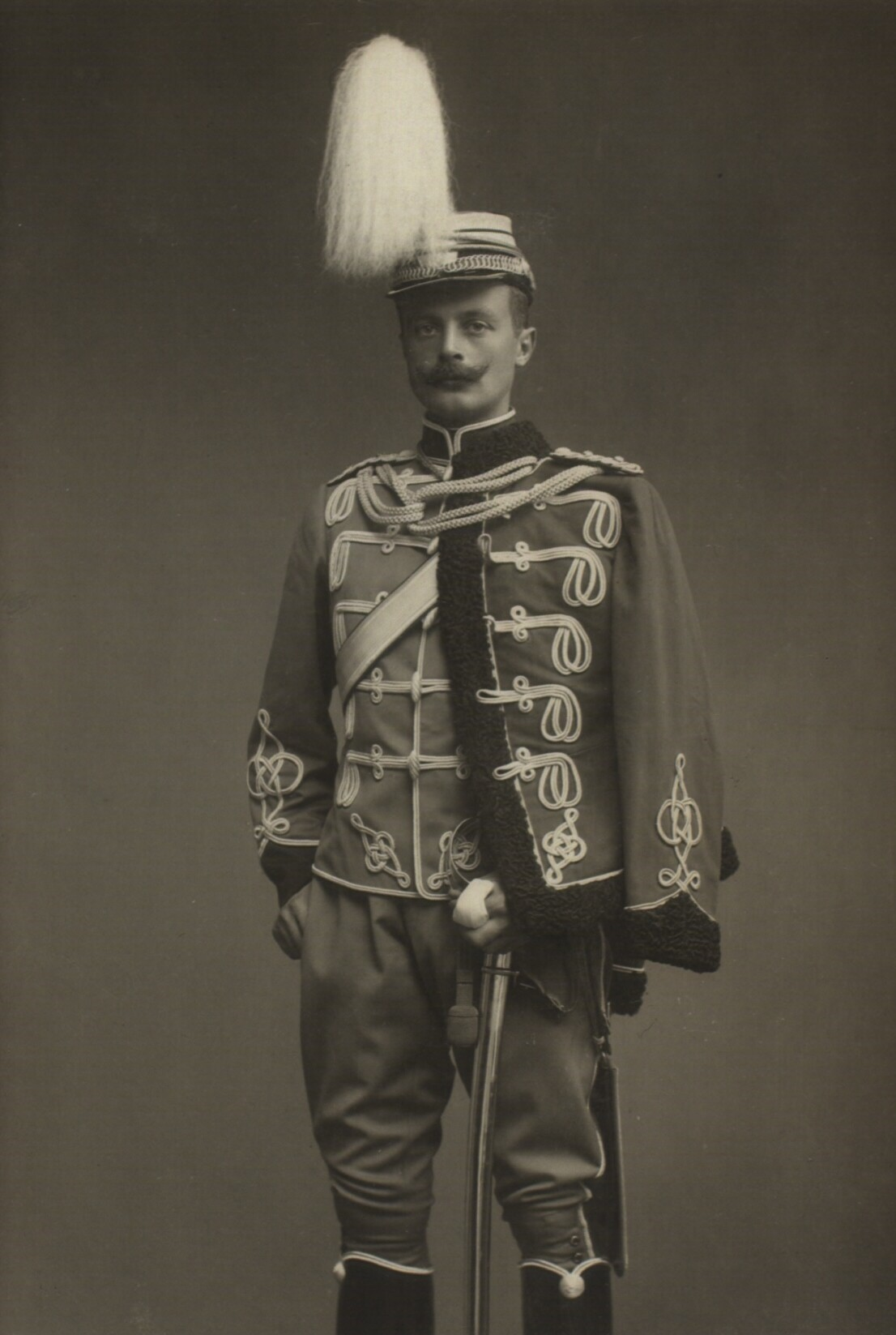
Post-1870 officer uniform

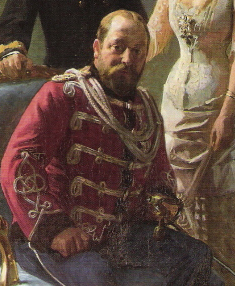
Edward, Prince of Wales wearing the officer pelisse

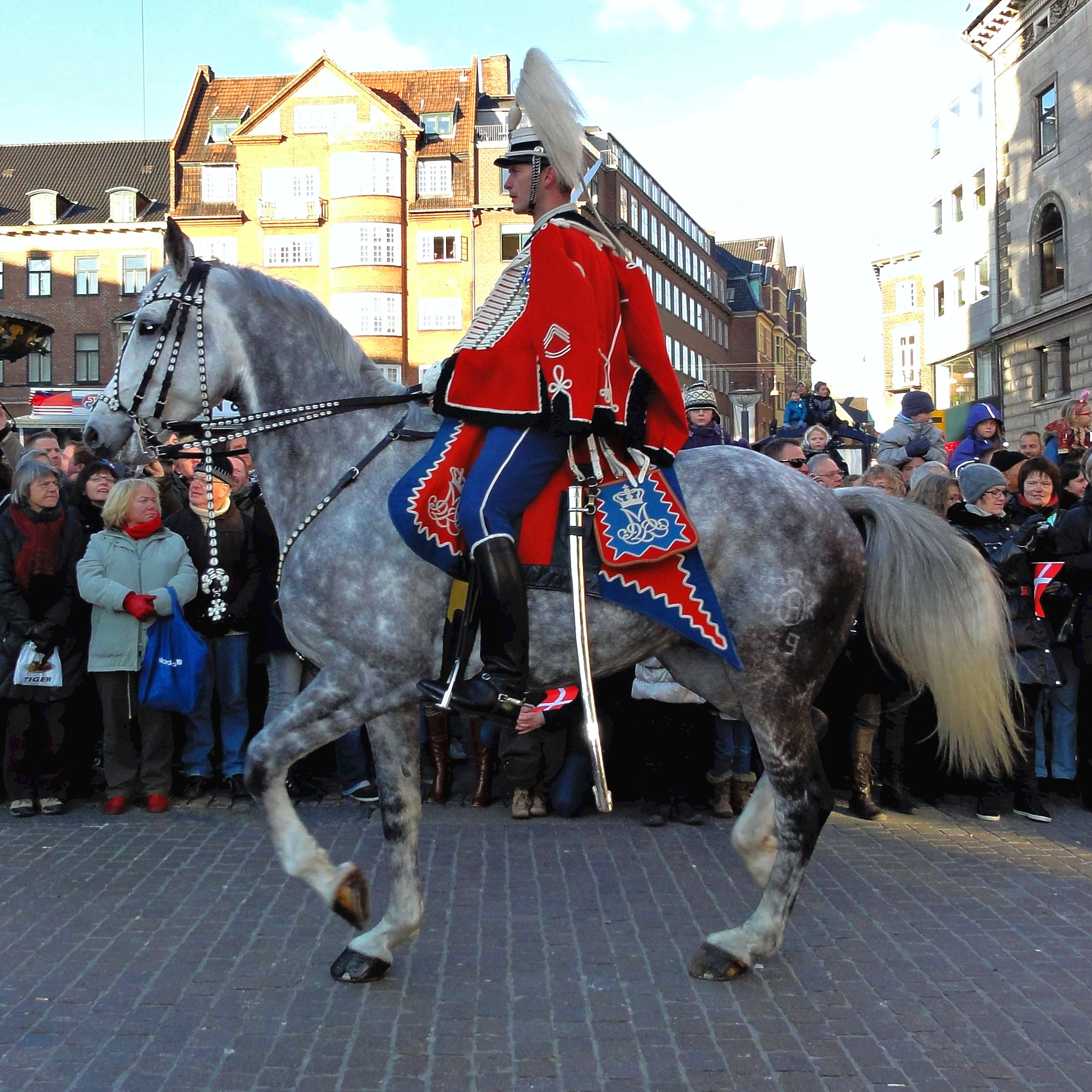
A Guard Hussar in mounted parade uniform, including the red pelisse, sabretache and shabraque

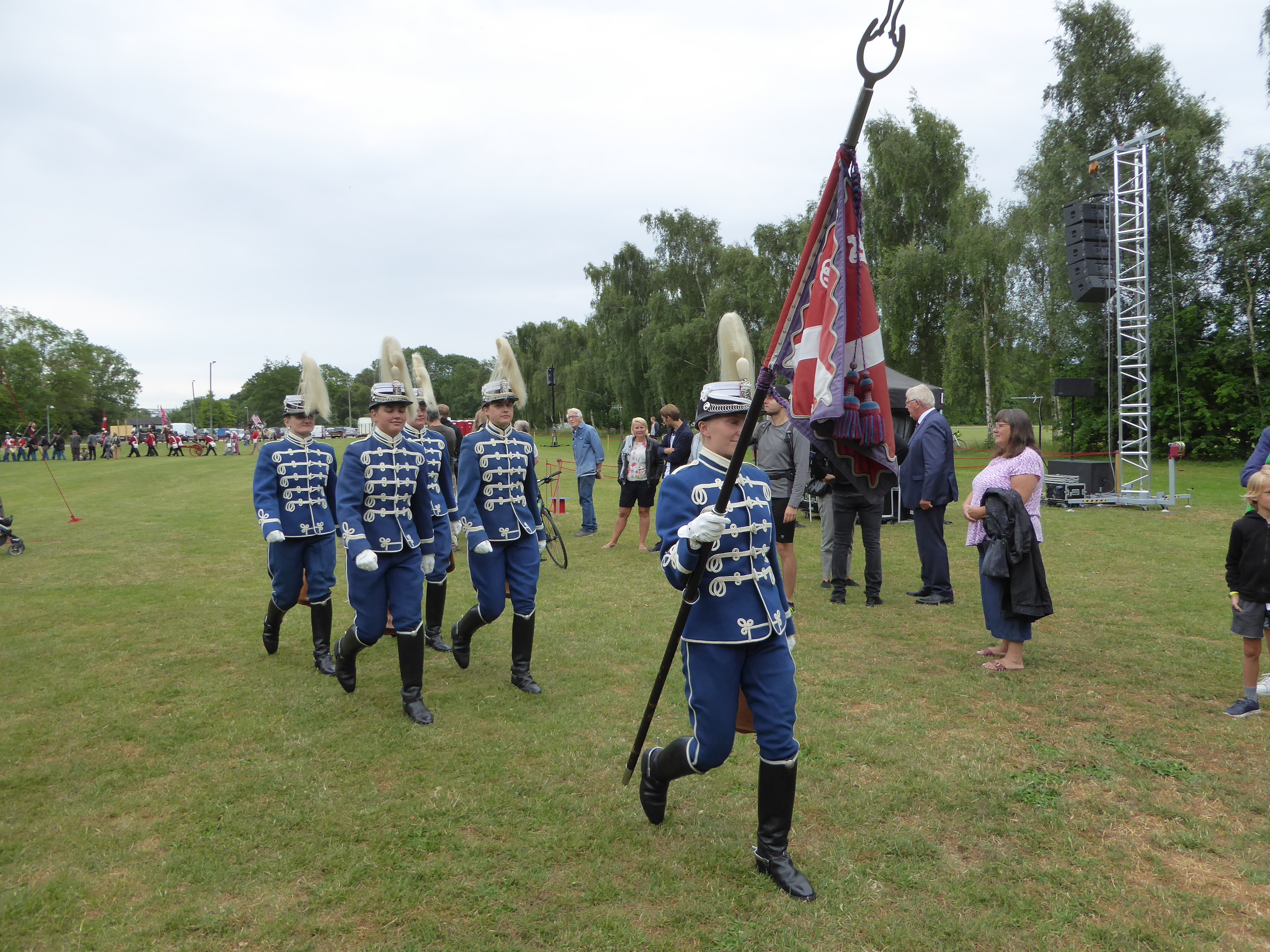
Foot parade, without pelisse

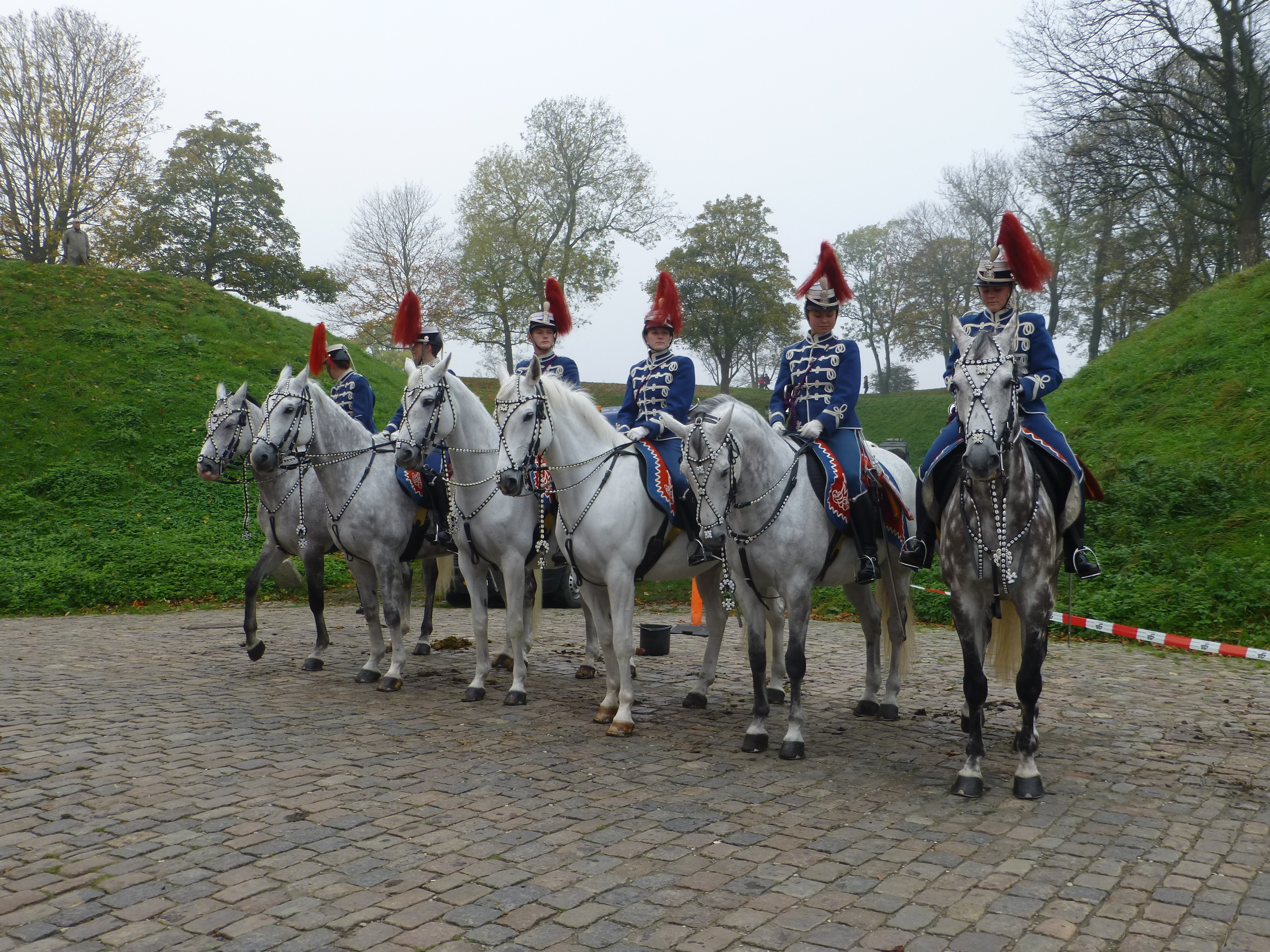

==== Life Guard ====
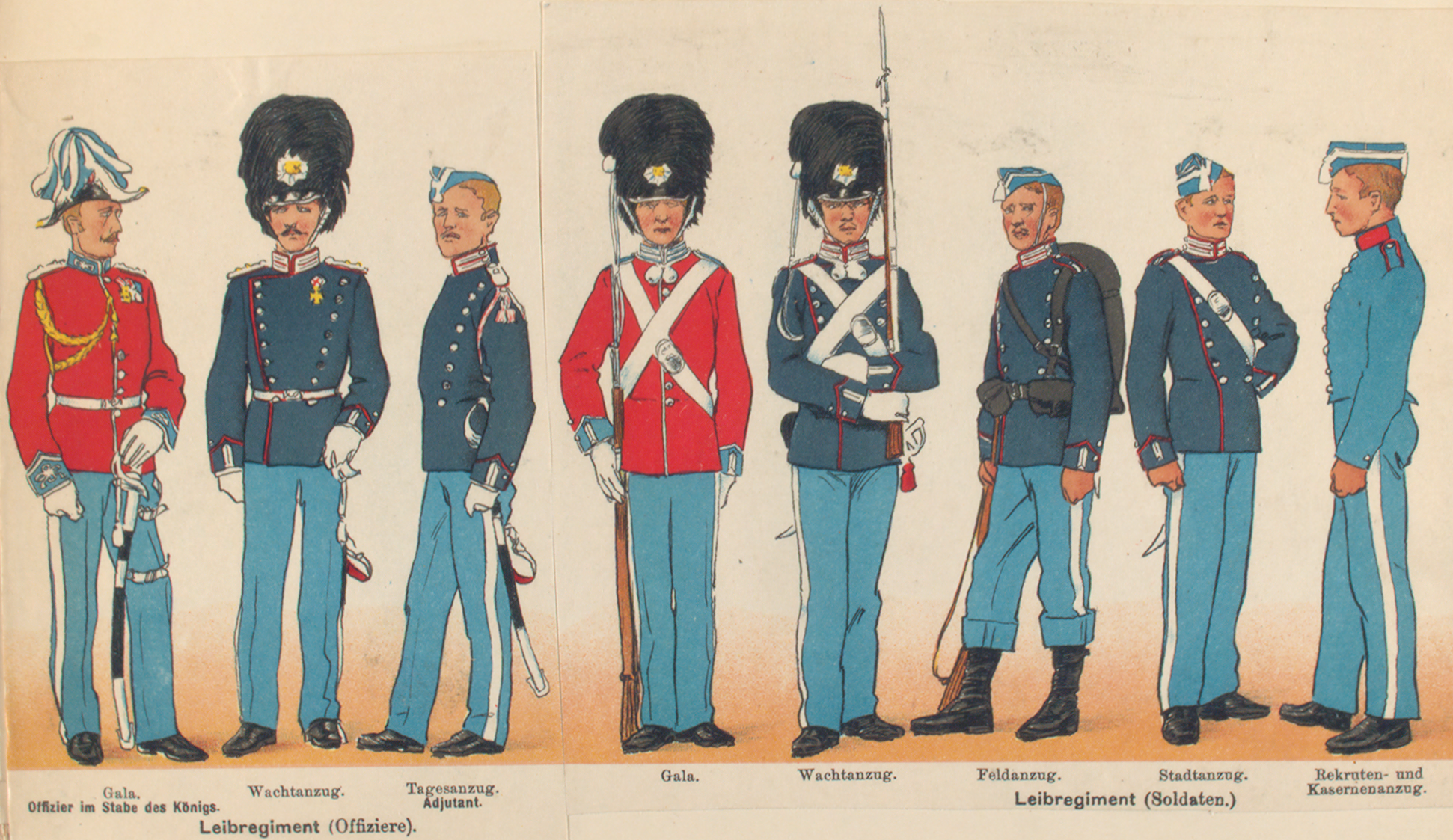
Different types

The Royal Life Guards can trace its uniforms back to 1660, where they would wear Red coats. Today, the Life Guards has two full dress uniforms, a guard duty and a royal version. These are mostly used by the Guard Company and are worn depending on the occasion.

The uniform in general features a scarlet or blue tunic (royal and guard version respectively), blue trousers, a white cross belt, and a bearskin with the regiment's cap badge.

The blue jacket was introduced originally in 1790, when uniforms from the disbanded Zealand Dragoon Regiment was given to the Life Guard, to serve as field uniform. However, they saw limited use, and was removed from service in 1793. In 1848, along with the general infantry, the dark blue double row tunic was introduced as a field uniform – resulting in the current blue guard jacket.

The original headgear for the Guards was the Tricorne, which was introduced along with the uniform in 1660. In 1790, it was changed to the Mitre. In 1805, the bearskin with feathers was introduced.

Like the Household Division of the British Army, the Royal Life Guards serve as an active protection force. As such they are issued modern assault rifles, rather than historic rifles like the Swedish Life Guards and U.S. Old Guard. The current M/95 was introduced for guard duty in 2003, replacing the older M/75, which in turn had replaced the M/50 in 1995.

Additionally, the Life Guards are also equipped with an infantry sabre, which originates from the First Schleswig War, where it was a Prize of war taken from the Germans and originally a French infantry sabre. The Guard Company has continued the tradition of different coloured sword knots depending on the company. The 1st Guard Company therefore have red sword knots, while the 2nd have white, 3rd have blue, 4th have yellow and the Music Band have Crimson red.

Royal Life Guard uniforms
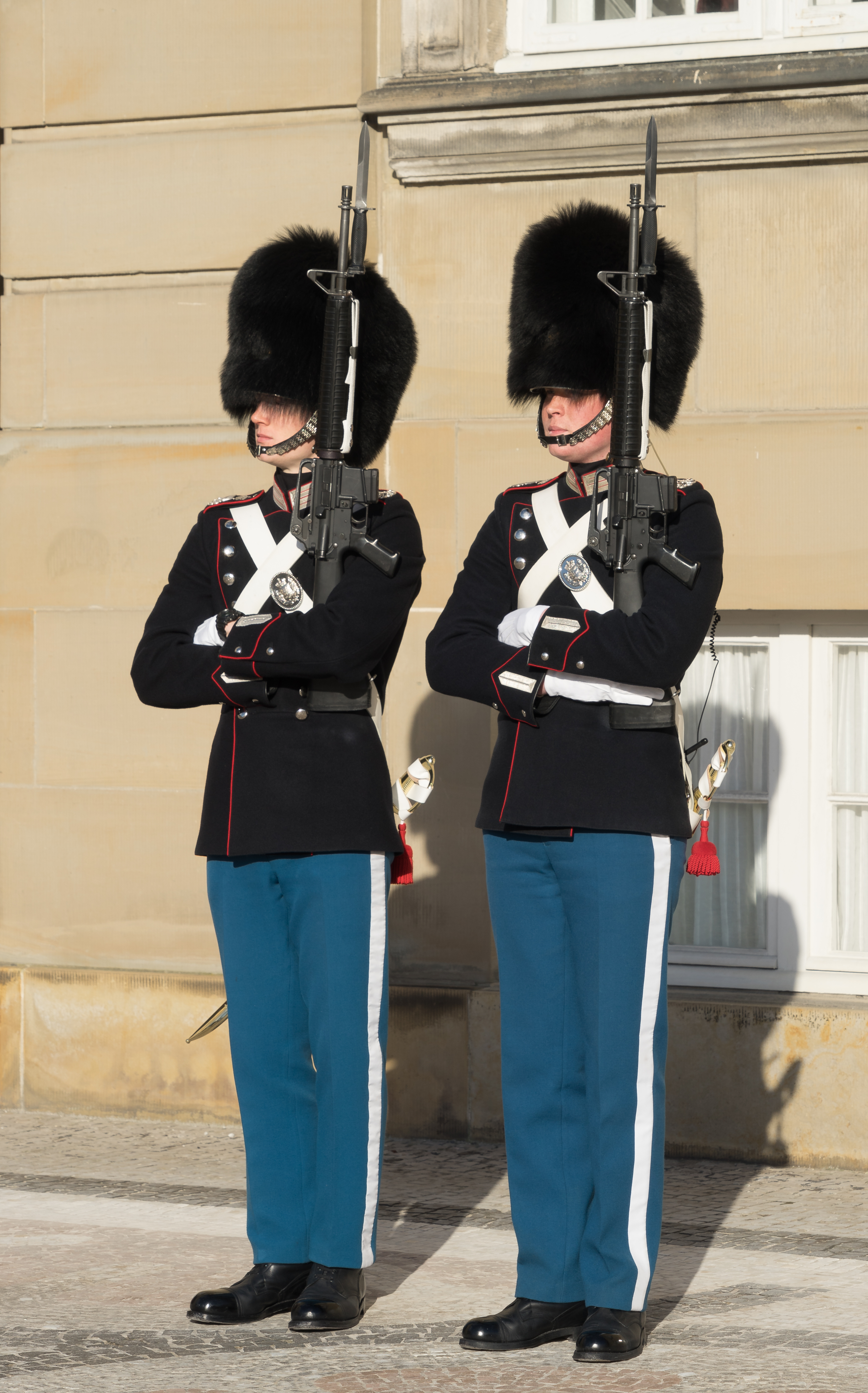
The dark blue normal tunic

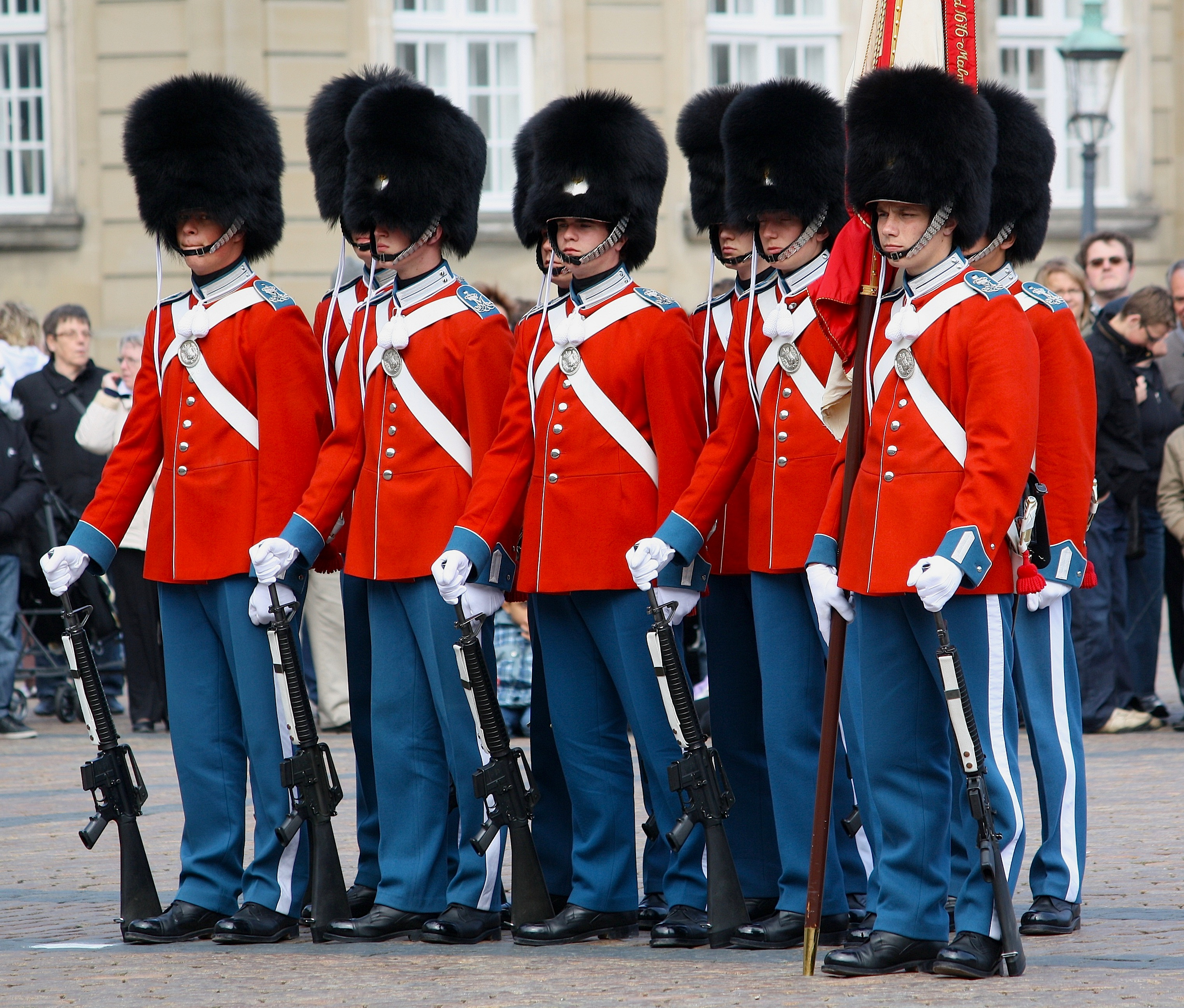
The red Royal tunic

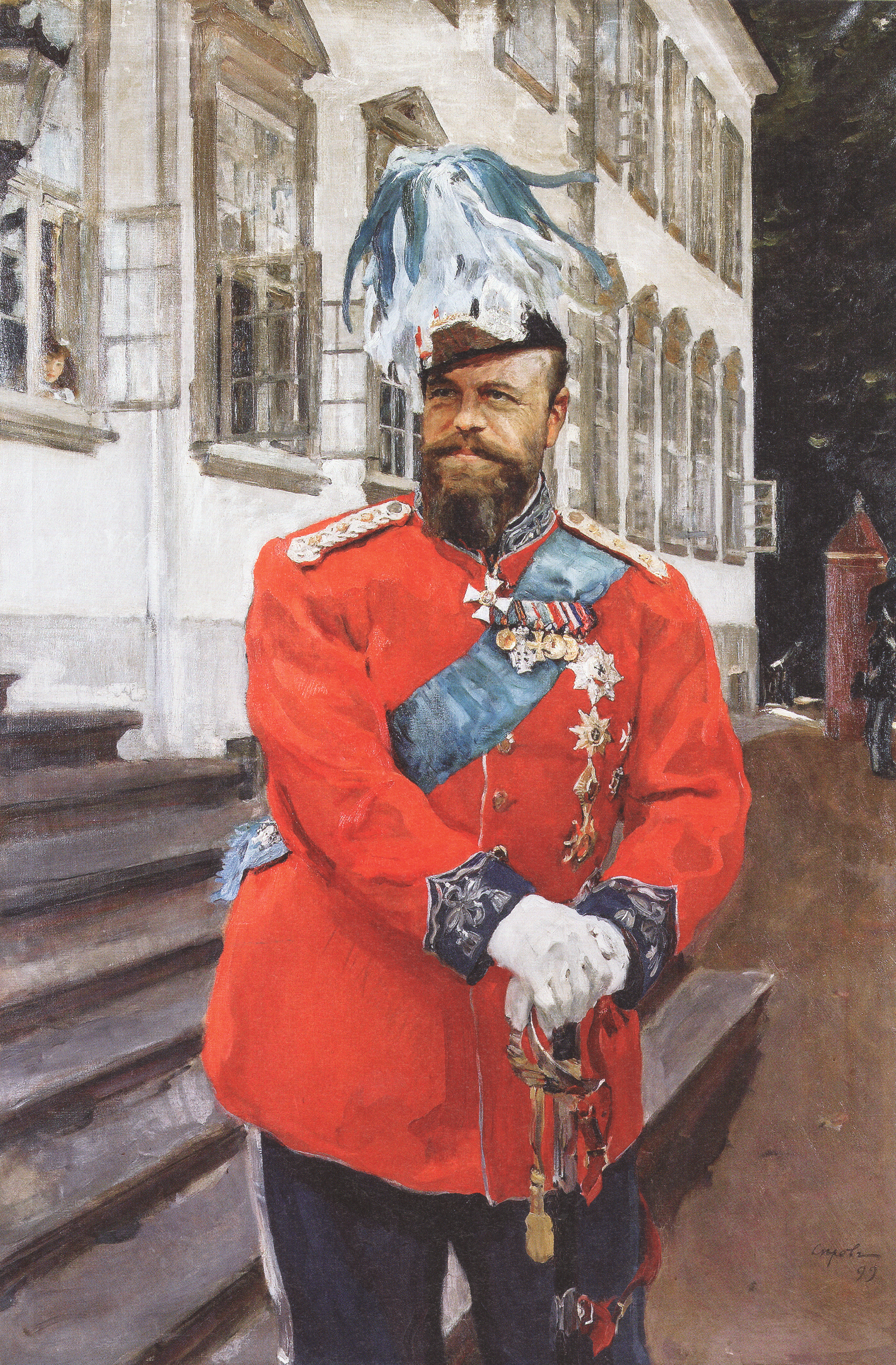
Alexander III in Danish Royal Life Guards officer uniform

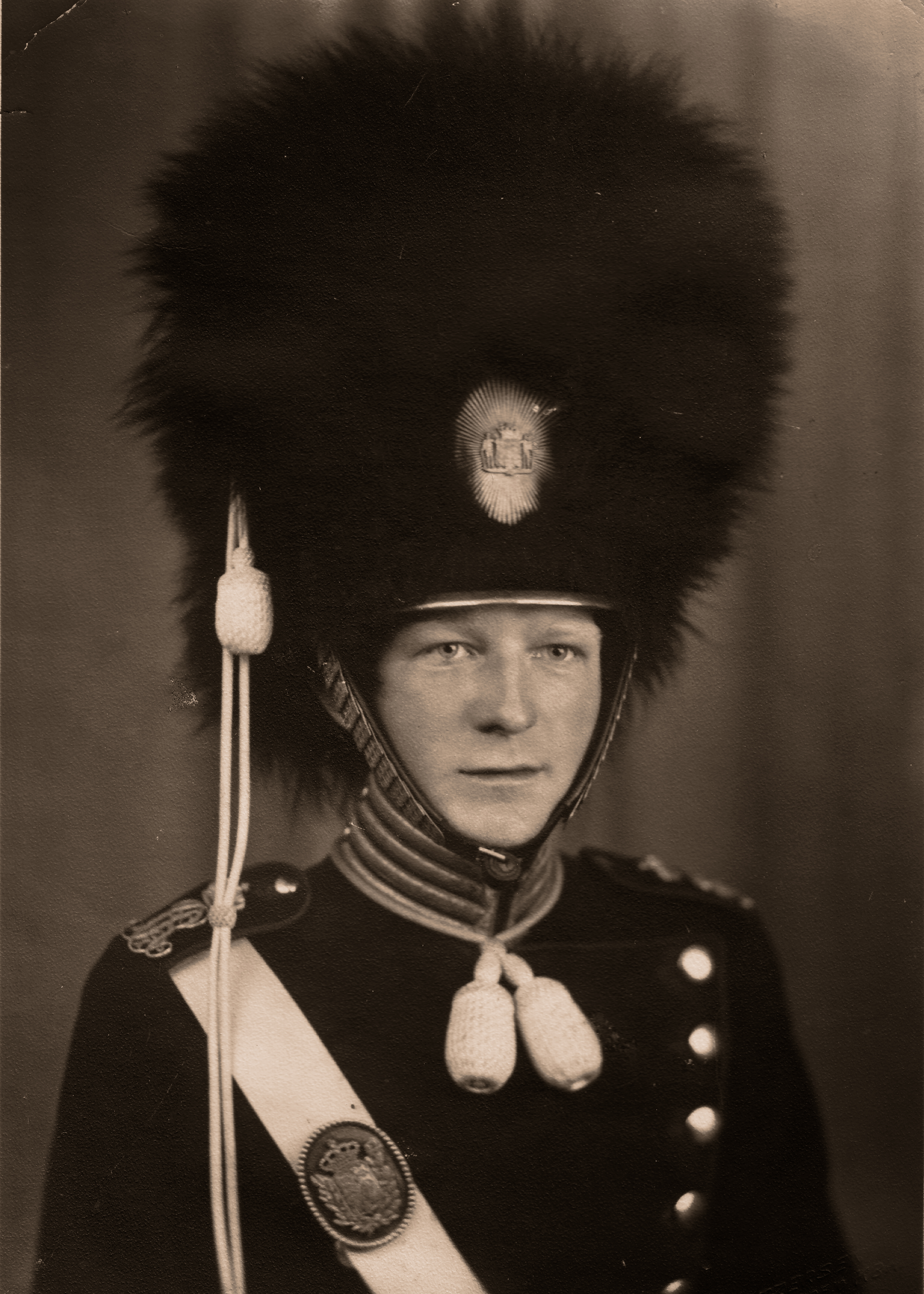

=== Mess dress ===
Male

Female

Mess dress

Snorefrakke

The Snorefrakke (or Snorekappe for the cavalry) is an all black Dolman. It can be traced back to 1858, and was meant to serve as an alternative to the standard uniform jacket. In 1923, it was changed to serve as an alternative to the standard mess dress, a function that continues to this day. It is worn with blue full-dress pants and a kepi, it not allowed to wear medals on the uniform, only ribbons.

Normal

With the introduction of the M/69 uniform, officers could wear service uniform, however, they lacked a mess dress that was not full dress or Snorefrakke. The army therefore, introduced the Selskabsuniform M/70, which can be worn as either a full evening dress or Black tie. The female version (M/81), only exists as black tie, and has a long skirt instead of pants.

Mess dress
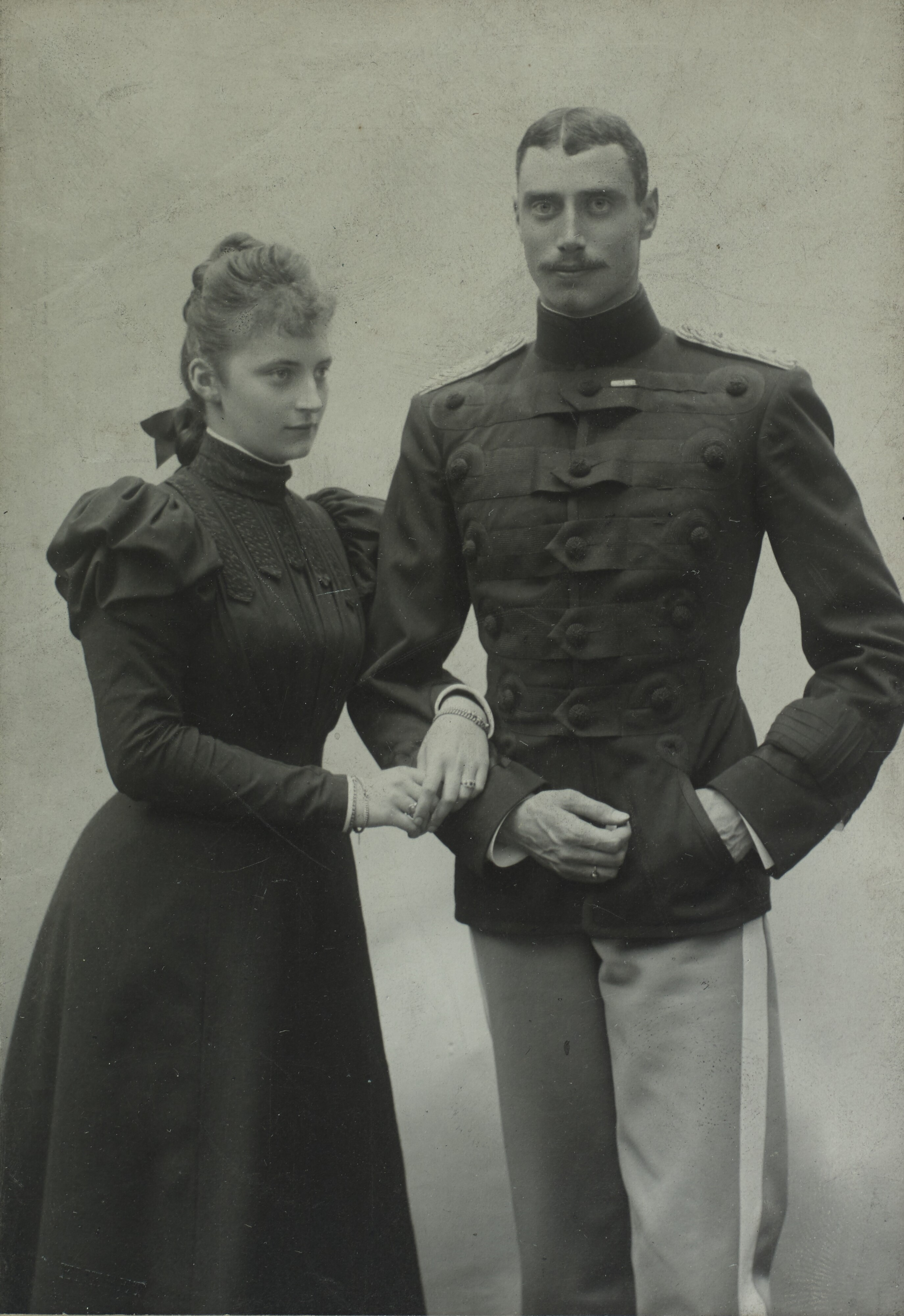
Christian X in Snorefrakke

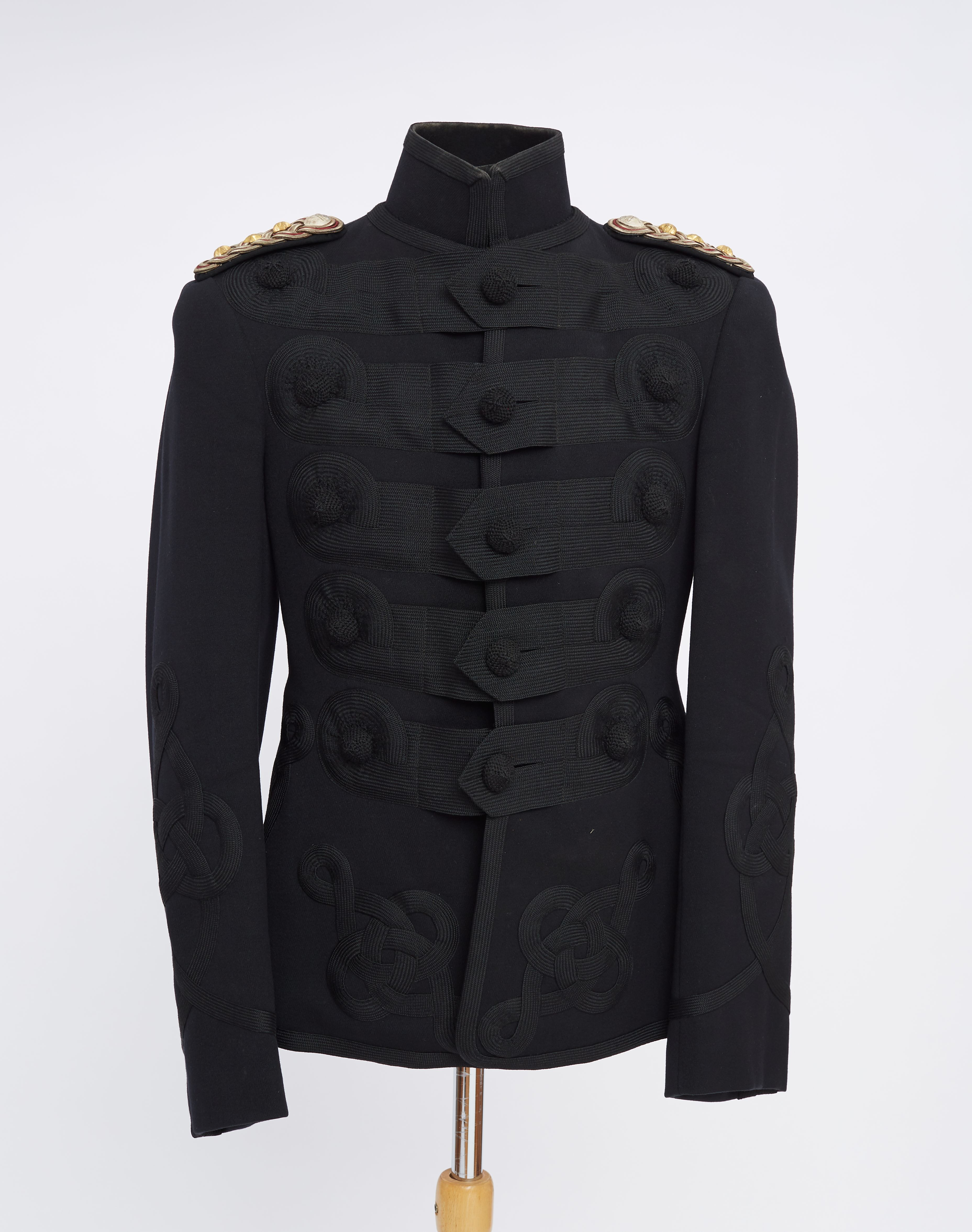
Snorefrakke

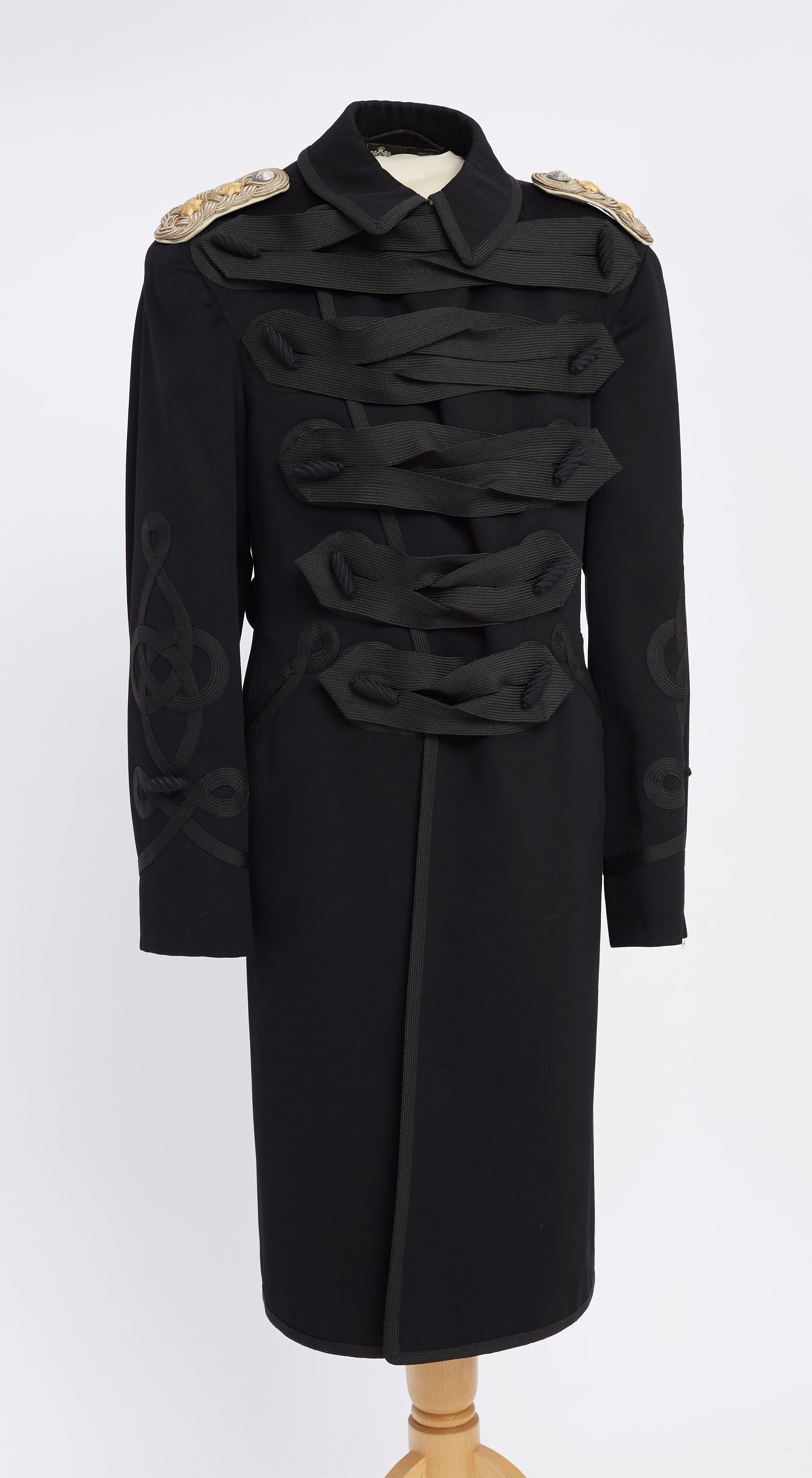
Snorekappe

=== Service uniform ===
Generals

Officers in the equestrian version

M/69 Service dress

During the '60s Danish Army officers, who was posted internationally, started to complain about the M/47 and M/59 service uniforms. The uniforms were seen as old and outdated, causing embarrassment for Danish officers serving international postings. Replacements for the M/47, started with T/68 test uniform, which was produced in different shades of green, and had a cut similar to the British battledress.

The final design was decided in 1968 and resemblances to the American Green Service Uniform. It meant that the peaked cap was removed from service, except for the General Corps, who retained the M/52 cap, however with a colour change to fit with the M/69 uniform. The M/69 is designed with 5 gold buttons (silver for HESK), two breast pockets and two lower pockets. It is worn with either a beret or a stiff forage cap for some officers. The pants worn with it are a darker shade of green with a black stripe down the outseam. The uniforms also features a black tie, black socks and shoes, and a white shirt. The tie was changed in 2000, from a woolen tie, to a standard tie. All M/69 feature insignia denoting the branch of service on their lapel. proficiency badges and tabs can be donned on the M/69 uniforms.

When women were allowed to join the military in 1971, a female version was introduced. The M/71(K) has no outer pockets and can be worn with either a long skirt or with pants.

Equestrian

There is also an equestrian version of the M/69, this is only given to HESK and officers of Guard Hussar Regiment as the regiment still employees horses on a daily basis. The equestrian uniform is the jacket of the M/69, but with green riding breeches in lieu of the green trousers, with extra long belt loops as to fit the stable belt. Black gloves, black riding boots with silver spurs and a black helmet or beret are also worn.

M/69
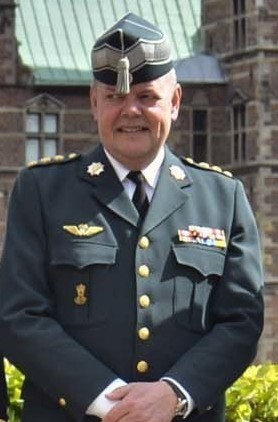
M/69 with hard forage cap and tassel

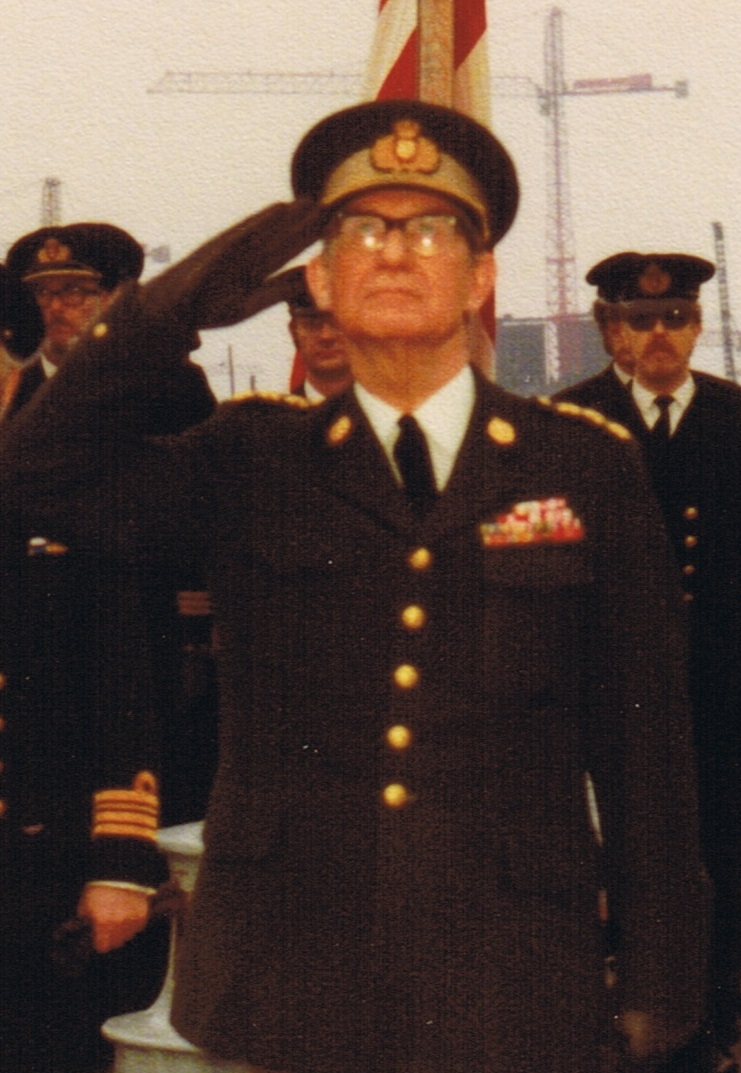
M/69 with peaked cap

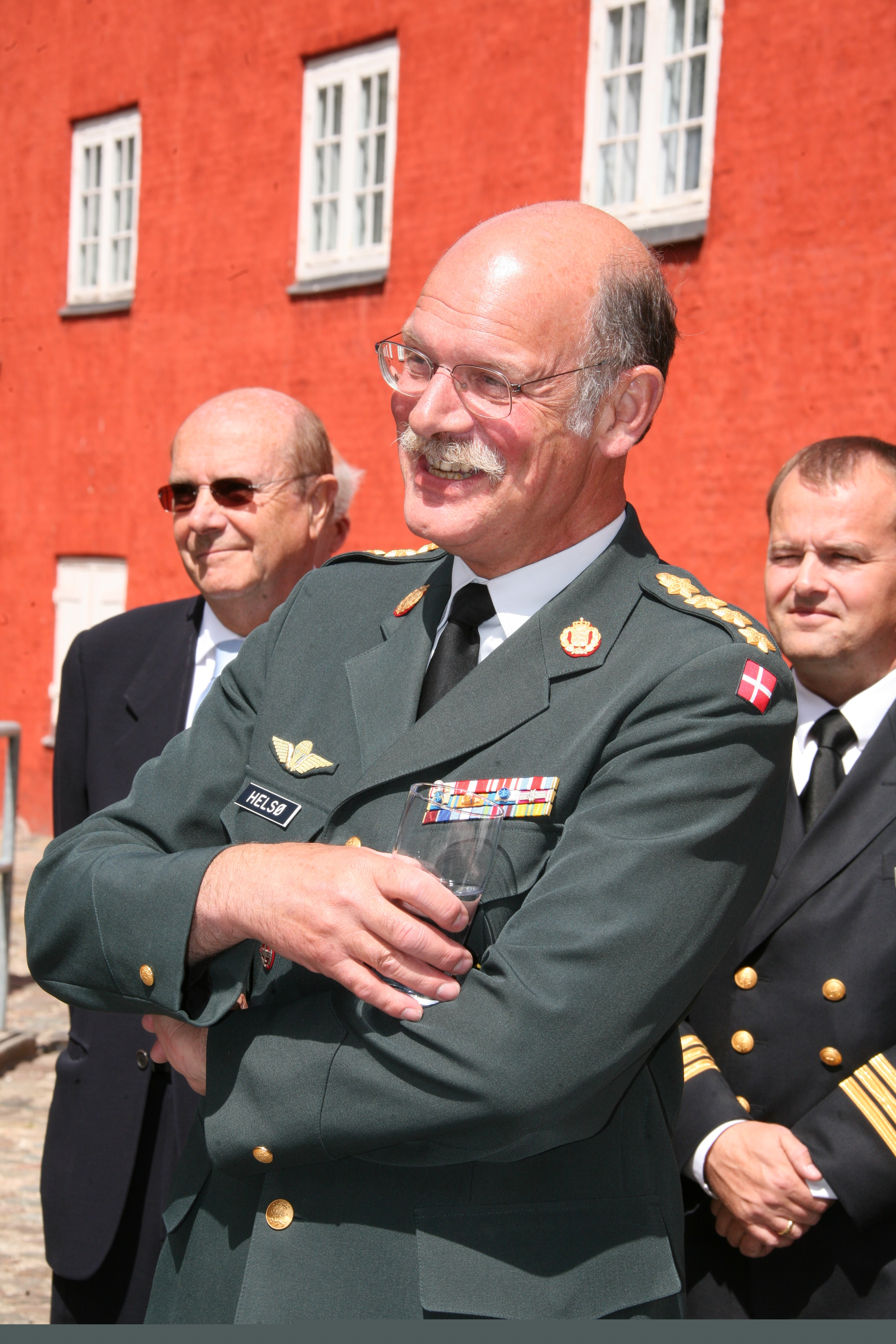
M/69

=== Combat uniforms ===
==== M/11 ====
Combat uniform

Barrack dress
with long sleeve shirt

M/11 uniform system

With the increase in international missions in arid environments, a decrease in national threats, and need for more modern equipment, it was decided that the M/01 and M/84 was insufficient. This along with the fact, that the current uniforms' camouflage pattern was too specialized for the modern Danish international engagements in changing environments.

One of the contenders was the Arid Flecktarn, which would have had the same pattern as the M/84 uniforms, but in different colours. It was however, decided that MultiCam would be the replacement, naming the new uniform system M/11, with a light and heavy version. The decision was based on experience from Danish and foreign special forces. It was furthermore estimated it would be cheaper to acquire a widely used camouflage than to create its own special uniform, and thereby removing the need for the M/01 desert uniform. The M/11 began to replace the M/84 Tjeneste and Kamp, from the winter of 2013, and saw a gradual replacement, with a completion date in 2018. The combat uniform is however different as there is more focus on personal customization, with improved body-armor and the new M/12 helmets. The barracks dress for the M/11 is the same design as the M/84 counterpart, with desert colours instead of M/84.

Uniforms
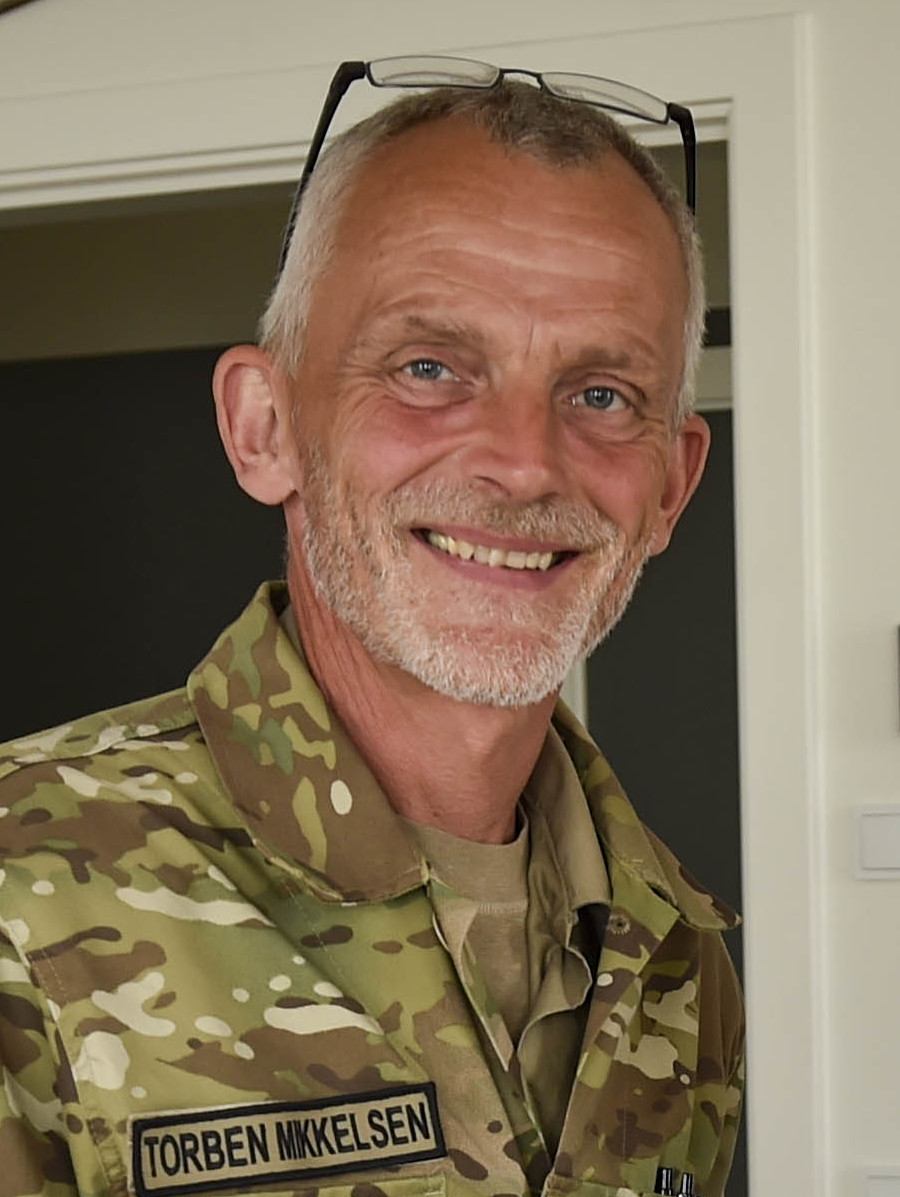
Garrison dress, with jacket

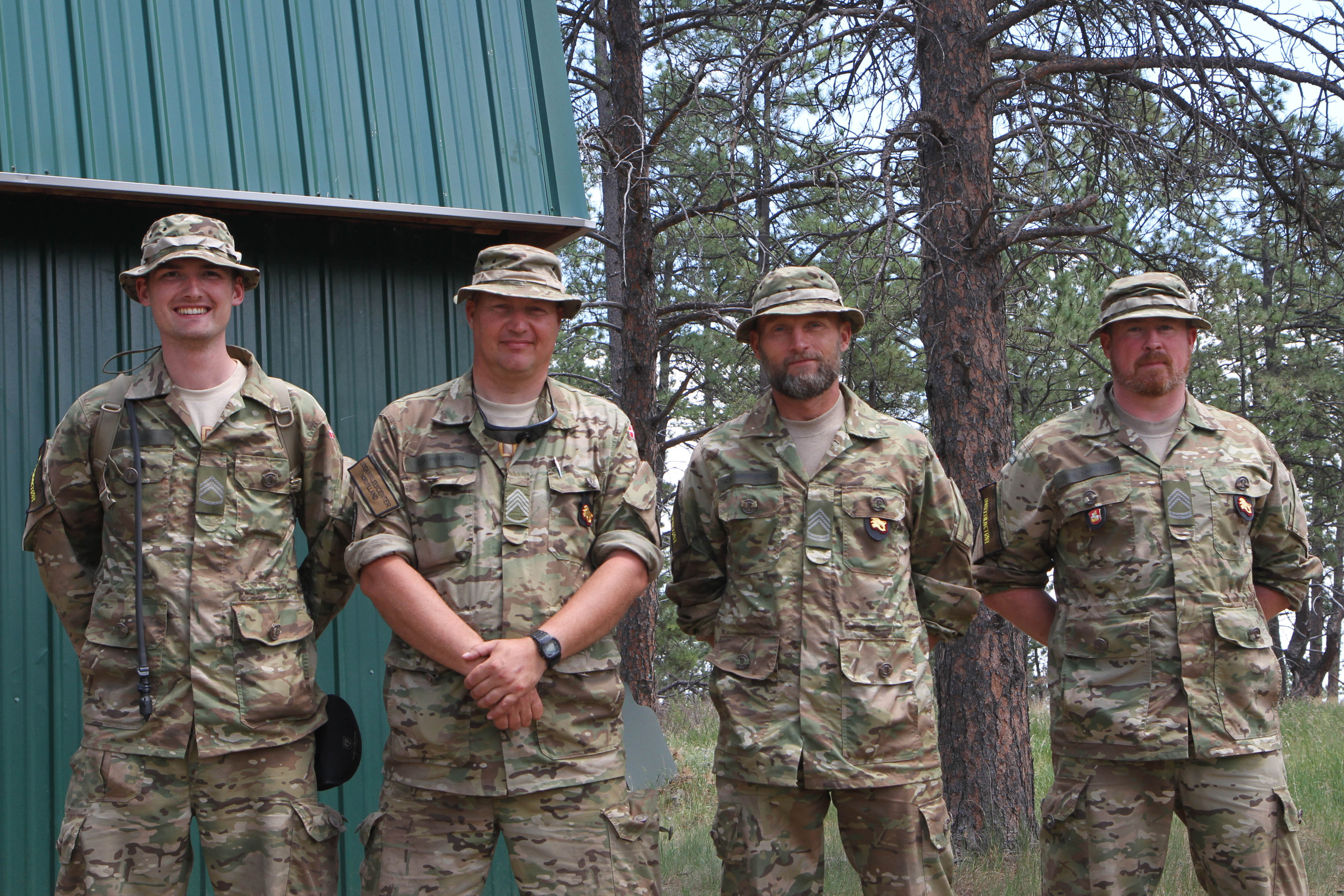
Garrison dress, with jacket

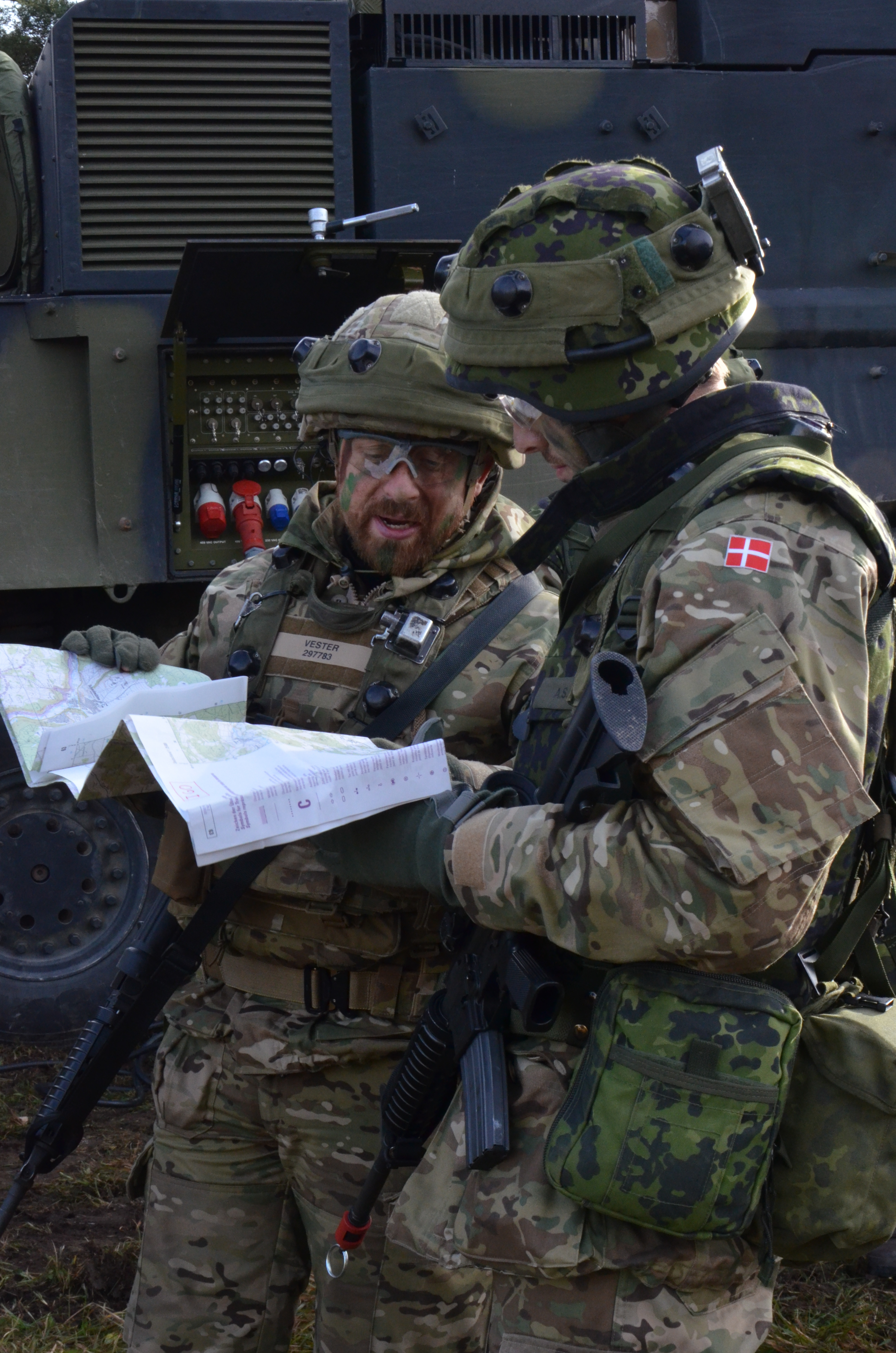
M/11 combat uniform, with a few M/84 pieces

==== NCU ====
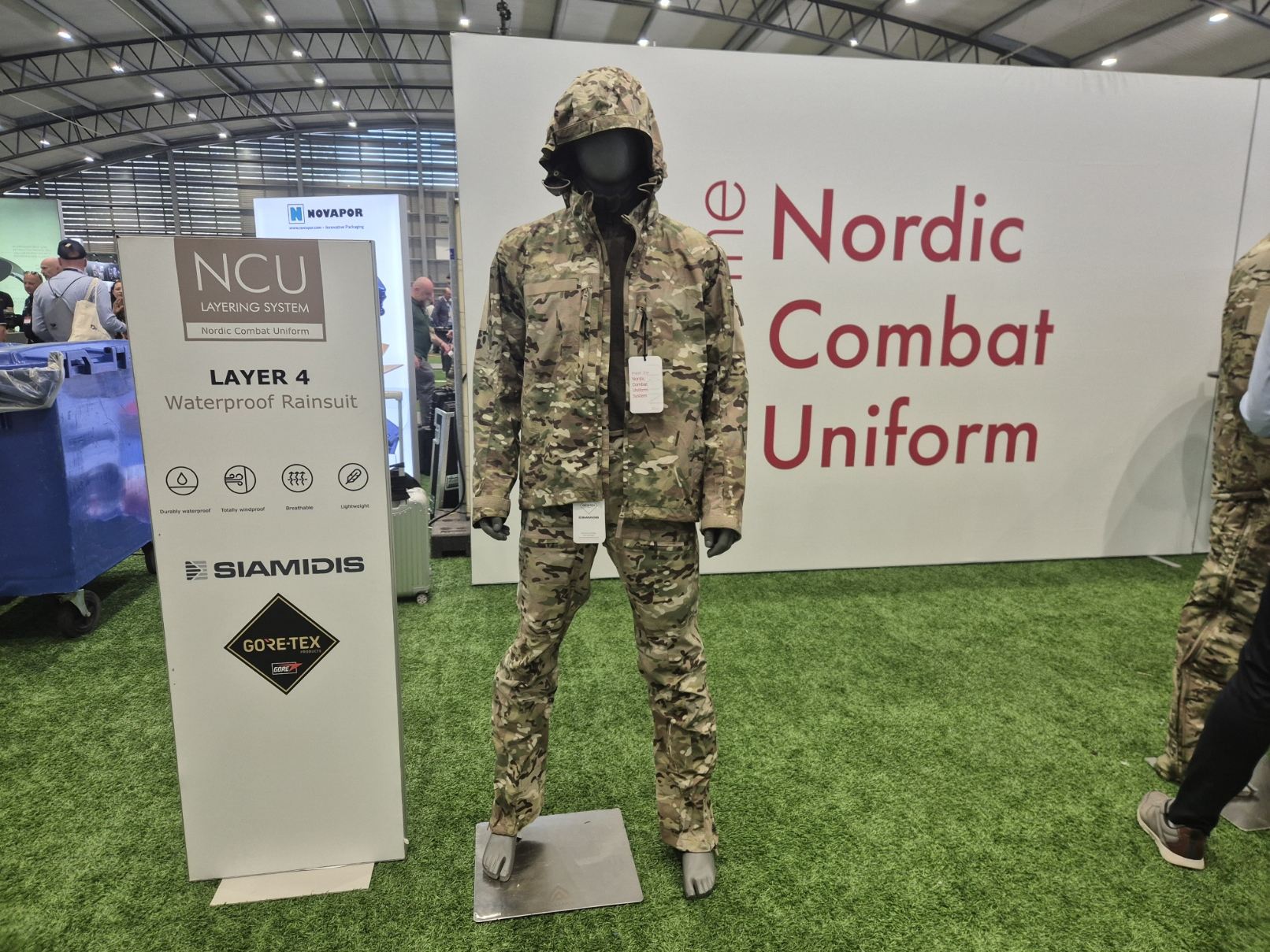
Danish NCU layer 4

In 2015, it was decided that a Nordic unified uniform system should replace the M/11. This was partly because M/11 was based around uniform systems from the 70s, and therefore in need of an update. By 2019, four final pre-qualified suppliers supplied test uniforms to the military, with soldiers from Guard Hussar Regiment, Jutland Dragoon Regiment, Signal Regiment and Engineer Regiment testing the uniforms. In 2022, Norwegian consortium Oskar Pedersen A/S was chosen as the supplier. By 2024, the first uniforms were delivered to Danish Defence Acquisition and Logistics Organization (DALO), with a plan of issuing the uniform system to Danish Defence and Home Guard from 2025 to 2027. Denmark will keep MultiCam as the camouflage pattern, the other countries will keep their own camouflage pattern. However, the Royal Danish Navy, Naval Home Guard and Danish Emergency Management Agency will be issued a blue uniform instead.

In June 2025, the first uniforms were issued to 30 soldiers of the Schleswig Regiment of Foot. The Danish variant of the uniform is the only one to incorporate RFID-chips in the cloths for improved inventory management. This decision caused alarm from some soldiers and received criticism, as there was a fear that the chips could be targeted by enemy forces. However, both DALO and experts dismissed this issue.

By November 2025, the issuing of the uniforms was paused following a lack of correct sizes.

==== M/26 ====
Due to the issues related to the NCU uniform, DALO signed a contract with Seyntex (working with Crye Precision) to deliver new uniforms. The uniform is named M/26 and is set to be introduced by October 2026.

== See also ==
- Ranks and insignia of Royal Danish Army

== Bibliography ==
Print

- Army Operational Command (September 2012). Uniformsbestemmelser for hæren [Uniform Regulations for the Army] (PDF) (in Danish). Archived from the original (PDF) on 19 October 2016.
- D'Ami, Rinaldo D. (1968). World Uniforms in Colour: European Nations. Patrick Stephens Ltd. ISBN 978-0850590319.
- HOK presse (2006). Skov, S. G. S. (ed.). "Ny udrustning til danske soldater" [New Equipment for Danish Soldiers]. Hærnyt (in Danish) (1). Army Operational Command. ISSN 0901-2540.
- Hærchefsergent (July 2018). Uniformsbestemmelser for hæren (UBH) Jul 2018 [Uniform Regulations for the Army - July 2018] (PDF) (in Danish). Archived from the original (PDF) on 2018-11-05.
- Knudsen, Dennis Vang (2011). Møller, Bjarne (ed.). "Ny uniform slører bedre". Hæren (in Danish) (5). Army Operational Command: 10–11. ISSN 1902-5734. Archived from the original on 27 February 2023.
- Kofoed, Jens, ed. (2002). "Nyt materiale på vej og allerede i brug" [New Material on its Way and Already in Use]. Hærnyt (in Danish) (2). Army Operational Command. ISSN 0901-2540.
- Nielsen, Bjørn (1992). Danske uniformer 1900-1990 : Hæren og Flyvevåbnet (in Danish). Tøjhusmuseet. ISBN 87-89022-26-2.
- Mølleskov, Niels (2006). Skov, S.G.S. (ed.). "Fra vissen bøgeskov til frisk granplantage". Hærnyt (in Danish) (2). Army Operational Command: 20–21. ISSN 0901-2540.
- Petersen, Karsten Skjold (2014). Kongens klæder – Hærens uniformer og udrustning i Danmark-Norge (in Danish) (1st ed.). Slovenia: Historika. ISBN 9788793229006.
- Skaarup, Jens Christian (2000). "Den militære uniformering på Bornholm" [Military uniforms on Bornholm]. Bornholmske Samlinger (in Danish). 14 (3). DK: Bornholms Historiske Samfund: 57–76.

Online

- Clausen, Henrik (2008). "Danish Army uniforms 1945-2008" (PDF). camopedia.org.
- FMI (13 November 2011). "Kampuniform M/11 kommer i multiterræn mønster". forsvaret.dk (in Danish).
- FMI (29 August 2018). "Ny nordisk kampuniform ind i ny fase". fmi.dk (in Danish). Archived from the original on 22 October 2018.
- FMI (11 November 2019). "Nyt nordisk kampuniformsprojekt er gået ind i testfasen". fmi.dk/ (in Danish). Danish Defence Acquisition and Logistics Organization. Archived from the original on 30 November 2019.
- FMI (24 June 2024). "Nyt kampuniformssystem udleveres fra 2025". fmi.dk/ (in Danish). Danish Defence Acquisition and Logistics Organization.
- Force Weekly (2 August 2012). "Ny uniform til danske soldater – godt eller skidt?". Force Weekly (in Danish). Archived from the original on 4 November 2016.
- Forsvarskommandoen (2 October 2018). "Velkommen til Vagthold/VTKMP/LG hjemmeside". www2.forsvaret.dk (in Danish).
- Gardehusarregimentet (n.d.). "Galla Uniform" (in Danish).
- Historisk Samling og Arkiv Himmerland (n.d.). "Uniformer gennem tiderne". histsamling.dk (in Danish). Archived from the original on 2 January 2013.
- Hvidt, A. N. (22 March 2003). "The Danish Infantry Uniforms and Equipment through-out The Past 200 Years" (PDF). chakoten.dk.
- KrigerenDK (11 October 2012a). "Ny standardhjelm M/12 og Multicam uniform udleveres fra januar 2013". Krigeren (in Danish).
- KrigerenDK (21 December 2012b). "First Official Look at the New Danish Uniform". Krigeren (in Danish).
- KrigerenDK (10 February 2013a). "M/84 udgave af "Multicam" kunne se sådan ud". krigeren.dk (in Danish). Archived from the original on 21 June 2017.
- KrigerenDK (21 February 2013b). "Multicam interview: Fem hurtige til Hærens kampskole". Krigeren (in Danish).
- KrigerenDK (8 February 2022). "Her er Forsvarets nye uniformer – Nordic Combat Uniform". krigeren.dk (in Danish).
- NORDEFCO. "Nordic Combat Uniform System". nordefco.org. Nordic Defence Cooperation. Archived from the original on 13 March 2018.
- /ritzau/ (6 May 2010). "Soldater får ny kampskjorte i Afghanistan". ekstrabladet.dk (in Danish). JP/Politikens Hus A/S. Ekstra Bladet.
- Sundsdal, Christian (2 September 2015). "Ny fællesnordisk uniform er i støbeskeen". krigeren.dk (in Danish).
- Sørensen, Kim Hartvig. "Hjemmeværnets Historiske Center". hjemmevaernsmuseum-holstebro.dk (in Danish).
- tactical.dk (6 November 2017). "Erfaringer efter 30 år som grejluder". Tactical.dk (in Danish).
- Værnsfælles Forsvarskommando (18 December 2016). "Livgardens historie". forsvaret.dk (in Danish). Archived from the original on 28 September 2018.
