= Denmark–Germany relations =

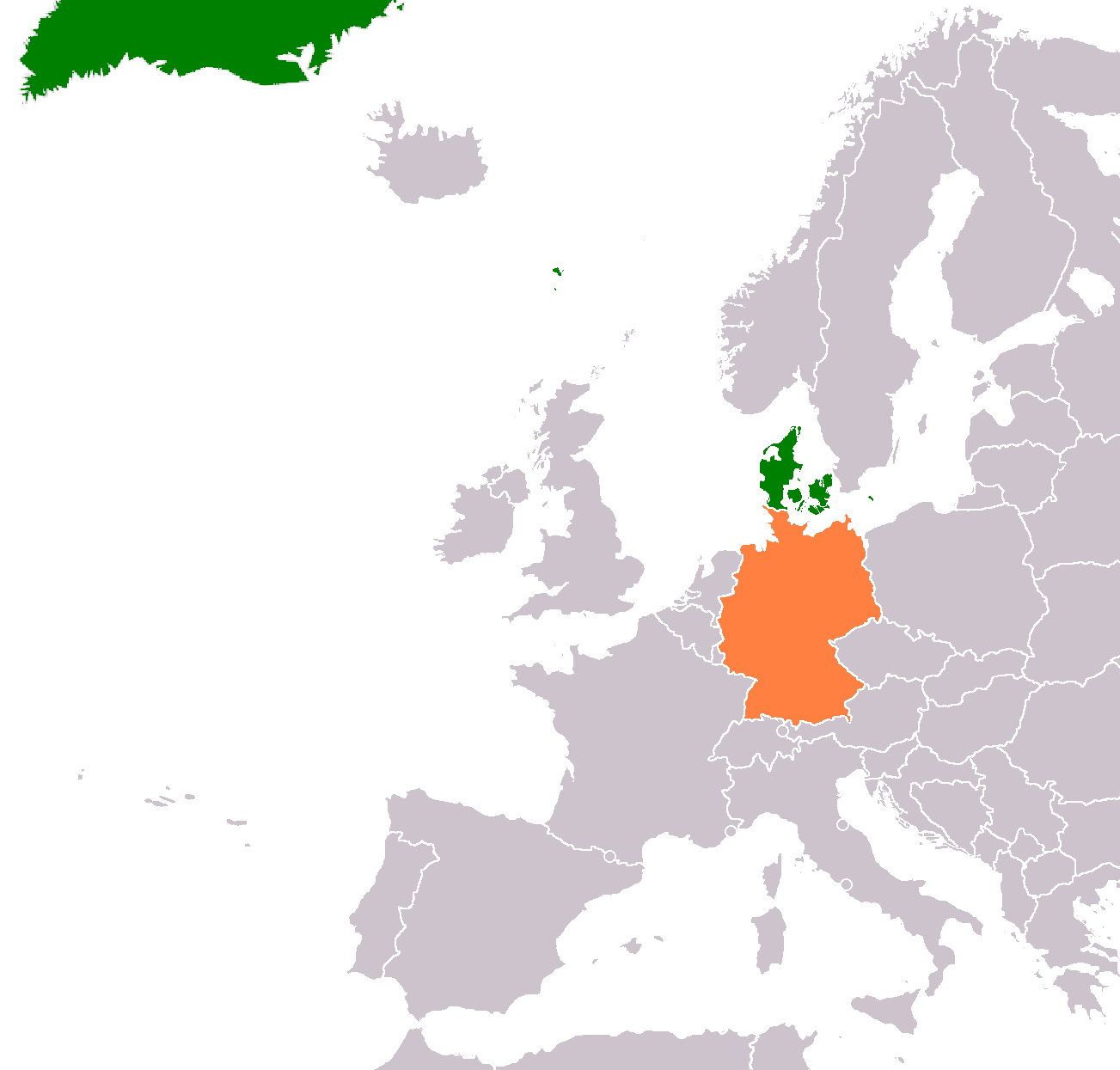

- Denmark: Germany

Diplomatic mission
- Embassy of Denmark, Berlin: Embassy of Germany, Copenhagen

Denmark and Germany are full members of NATO and of the European Union. The border between the countries, which lies in the Schleswig region, has changed several times through history, the present border was determined by referendums in 1920. The Danish-German border area has been named as a positive example for other border regions. Substantial minority populations live on both sides of the border, and cross-border cooperation activities are frequently initiated.

== History ==
=== Early history ===
Both what is now Denmark and Germany were settled by Proto-Germanic peoples. The Ahrensburg culture, named after the town of Ahrensburg in the German state of Schleswig-Holstein, originated mostly in the North German Plain and were the first known peoples to settle modern-day Denmark. By the 2nd century AD, Proto-Norse evolved from Proto-Germanic in Scandinavia. This separated the West Germanic (of whom Germans are associated) and the North Germanic peoples (of whom the Danish are associated).

=== Medieval period ===
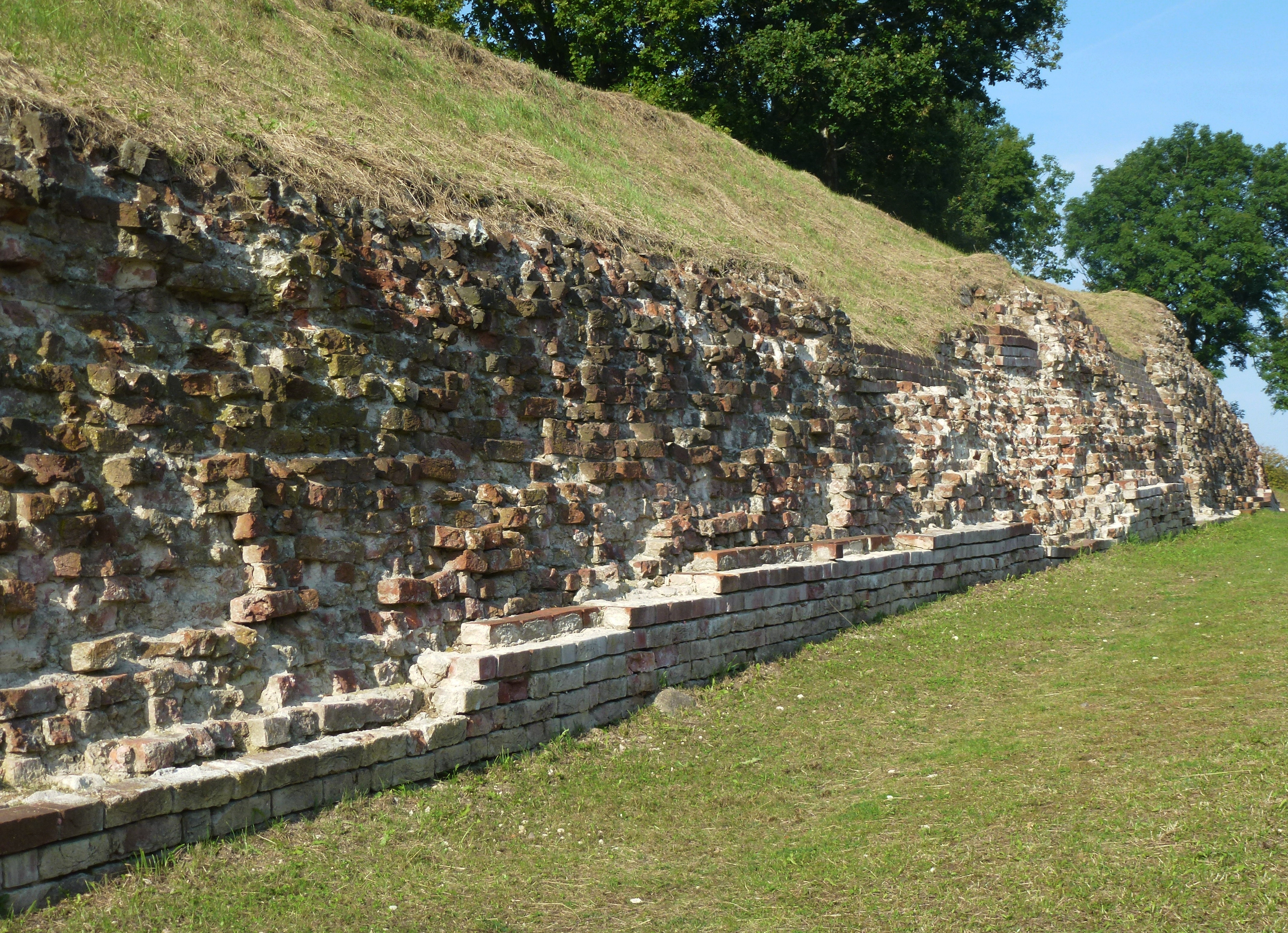
Valdemar's Wall, part of the medieval Danevirke fortifications on the former Dano-German border

Modern northern outskirts of Germany formed part of Denmark in the Middle Ages, including the major medieval Danish city of Hedeby, and the town of Schleswig (Danish: Slesvig), founded in the mid-11th century after the destruction of Hedeby. The Danish-ruled Duchy of Schleswig, now divided between Denmark and Germany, was named after the town. A system of medieval Danish border fortifications, called the Danevirke, is located in modern northern Germany. Denmark was also the suzerain of the Slavic Principality of Rügen in modern north-eastern Germany in the High Middle Ages before it passed under the suzerainty of the Holy Roman Empire.

In addition to the clashes in the Dano-German border area, Denmark has been involved in rivalries in the Baltic Sea with German and other states, at various times either fighting wars against the Germans or forging alliances with them. Major Dano-German conflicts include the German–Danish War of 974, and wars between Denmark and the German-dominated Hanseatic League in 1361–1370 and 1426–1435. Denmark was allied with various German states during the Wendish Crusade of 1147 and Third Crusade of 1189–1192. In 1315 Denmark entered a large alliance with Norway, Poland, Sweden, the Duchy of Pomerania and Duchy of Mecklenburg against the Margraviate of Brandenburg, and then Danish and Mecklenburg forces clashed with Brandenburg in the Battle of Gransee of 1316. From 1320 Denmark was involved in the war for inheritance in Brandenburg after the extinction of the Brandenburgian line of the Ascanian dynasty, supporting the claims of the duchies of Pomerania and Jawor in Poland against the duchies of Mecklenburg and Saxe-Wittenberg, however, in 1323 Denmark switched to the side of a new participant in the war for Brandenburg, that is the Wittelsbachs of Bavaria. In 1350 and 1363 Denmark entered alliances with Poland against the Teutonic Order. During the Polish–Teutonic wars of 1409–1411 and 1454–1466, Denmark temporarily sided with the Teutonic Knights, but withdrew from the war with a truce with Poland in 1458.

=== Reformation ===
==== Lutheranism ====
Chalcedonian Christianity was introduced to Denmark in the 9th century by Ansgar, Archbishop of Hamburg-Bremen. In the 10th century, King Harald Bluetooth became a Catholic and began organizing the church, and by the 11th century, Christianity was largely accepted throughout the country. Since the Reformation in Denmark, the church has been Evangelical Lutheran, while retaining much of its high church pre-Reformation liturgical traditions. The 1849 Constitution of Denmark designated the church "the Danish people's church" and mandates that the state support it as such. The Church of Denmark continues to maintain the historical episcopate. Theological authority is vested in bishops: ten bishops in mainland Denmark and one in Greenland, each overseeing a diocese. The bishop of Copenhagen is primus inter pares.

==== German impact on Danish culture and society ====
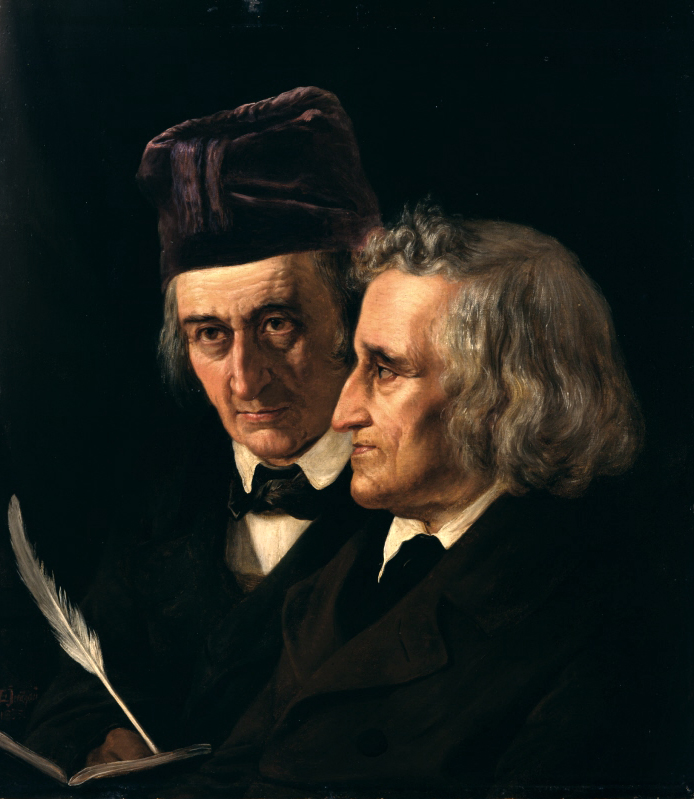
Since the Reformation, Germany has had a significant impact on the mainstream Danish culture, especially in the literature-based contexts: Hans Christian Andersen's stories were heavily inspired by those of the Brothers Grimm.

=== Second Schleswig War ===
Territorial changes after the Second Schleswig War

The Second Schleswig War was the second military conflict as a result of the Schleswig-Holstein Question. It began on 1 February 1864, when Prussian forces crossed the border into Schleswig.

Denmark fought Prussia and Austria. Like the First Schleswig War (1848–51), it was fought for control of the duchies because of succession disputes concerning the duchies of Holstein and Lauenburg when the Danish king died without an heir acceptable to the German Confederation. Decisive controversy arose due to the passing of the November Constitution, which brought the Duchy of Schleswig closer to the kingdom of Denmark in violation of the London Protocol, after the German Confederation had rejected the previous state constitution (Helstatsforfatning).

The war ended on 30 October 1864, when the Treaty of Vienna caused Denmark's cession of the Duchies of Schleswig, Holstein, and Saxe-Lauenburg to Prussia and Austria. The war resulted in a German victory.

=== World War I ===
The 1914 Septemberprogramm authorized by German Chancellor Theobald von Bethmann Hollweg proposed the creation of a Central European Economic Union, comprising a number of European countries, including Germany and Denmark, in which, as the Chancellor secretly stressed, there was to be a semblance of equality among the member states, but in fact it was to be under German leadership to stabilize Germany's economic predominance in Central Europe, with co-author Kurt Riezler admitting that the union would be a veiled form of German domination in Europe (see also: Mitteleuropa). The plan failed amid Germany's defeat in the war.

Denmark, despite having remained neutral all throughout World War I, still ended up involved in the negotiations following the defeat of Germany, due to US President Woodrow Wilson's Fourteen Points listing the different people of Europe's right to self-determination amongst its principles, and the substantial Danish minority living in the Southern Jutland/Northern Schleswig area. Eventually, it was decided that the question of national affiliation for the people living in the area would be settled through a series of public plebiscites.

In accordance with negotiations, the Southern Jutland/Northern Schleswig area was split into three different zones. After an agreement between the Danish government, who declared they had no real interest in the third, southernmost zone, and the British prime-minister Lloyd George, who wanted to give Germany some minor concessions in the peace treaty, it was decided that no election was to take place there, while elections were to take place in the two other zones.

The elections could not be arranged until the Treaty of Versailles became effective in January 1920, but following that it was decided that elections were to take place in the first, northernmost zone on 10 February, and the second, middle zone on 14 March. In the outcome of the first zone election, about 75 percent of the votes favored a reunification with Denmark, while in the second zone about 80 percent of the votes were in favor of staying affiliated with Germany. Further negotiations between the Danish and the German governments settled on Denmark getting the area of Tønder, despite it formally being a part of the second zone, while the Flensborg area was to remain on German hands. On 15 June the Southern Jutland area was formally returned to Danish control.

=== World War II ===
Operation Weserübung was the code name for Germany's assault on Denmark and Norway during the Second World War and the opening operation of the Norwegian Campaign. The name comes from the German for Operation Weser-Exercise, the Weser being a German river.

In the early morning of 9 April 1940, Germany invaded Denmark and Norway, ostensibly as a preventive maneuver against a planned, and openly discussed, Franco-British occupation of both these countries. After the invasions, envoys of the Germans informed the governments of Denmark and Norway that the Wehrmacht had come to protect the countries' neutrality against Franco-British aggression. Significant differences in geography, location and climate between the two countries, however, made the actual military operations very dissimilar.

Strategically, Denmark's importance to Germany was as a staging area for operations in Norway, and of course as a border nation to Germany which would have to be controlled in some way. Given Denmark's position in relation to the Baltic Sea the country was also important for the control of naval and shipping access to major German and Soviet harbours.

Small and relatively flat, the country was ideal territory for German army operations, and Denmark's small army had little hope. Nevertheless, in the early morning hours, a few Danish troops engaged the German army, suffering losses of 16 dead and 20 wounded. The Germans lost an unknown number of casualties, with 12 armoured cars and several motorcycles and cars destroyed. Four German tanks were damaged. One German bomber was also damaged. Two German soldiers were temporarily captured by the Danes during the brief fighting.

At 04:00 on 9 April 1940, the German ambassador to Denmark, Renthe-Fink, called the Danish Foreign Minister Munch and requested a meeting with him. When the two men met 20 minutes later, Renthe-Fink declared that German troops were at that moment moving in to occupy Denmark to protect the country from Franco-British attack. The German ambassador demanded that Danish resistance cease immediately and contact be made between Danish authorities and the German armed forces. If the demands were not met, the Luftwaffe would bomb the capital, Copenhagen.

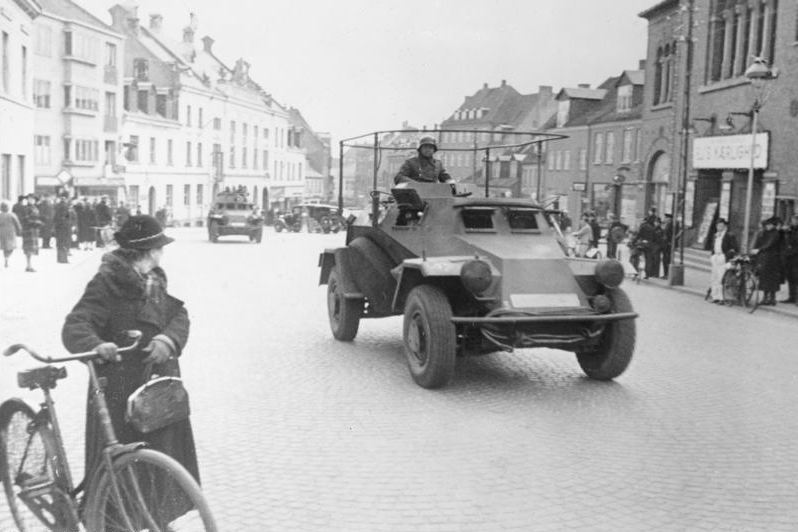
German armoured car in Jutland.

As the German demands were communicated, the first German advances had already been made, with forces landing by ferry in Gedser at 04:15 and moving north. German Fallschirmjäger units had made unopposed landings and taken two airfields at Aalborg, the Storstrøm Bridge as well as the fortress of Masnedø.

At 04:20 local time, 1,000 German infantrymen landed in Copenhagen harbour from the minelayer Hansestadt Danzig, quickly capturing the Danish garrison at the Citadel without encountering resistance. From the harbour, the Germans moved towards Amalienborg Palace to capture the Danish royal family. By the time the invasion forces arrived at the king's residence, the King's Royal Guard had been alerted and other reinforcements were on their way to the palace. The first German attack on Amalienborg was repulsed, giving Christian X and his ministers time to confer with the Danish Army chief General Prior. As the discussions were ongoing, several formations of Heinkel He 111 and Dornier Do 17 bombers roared over the city dropping the OPROP! leaflets. Faced with the explicit threat of the Luftwaffe bombing the civilian population of Copenhagen, and only General Prior in favour of continuing to fight, King Christian X and the entire Danish government capitulated at 08:34 in exchange for retaining political independence in domestic matters.

At 05:45, two squadrons of German Bf 110s attacked Værløse airfield on Zealand and wiped out the Danish Army Air Service by strafing. Despite Danish anti-aircraft fire, the German fighters destroyed 11 Danish aircraft and seriously damaged another 14.

The invasion of Denmark lasted less than six hours and was the shortest military campaign conducted by the Germans during the war. The rapid Danish capitulation resulted in the uniquely lenient Occupation of Denmark, particularly until the summer of 1943, and in postponing the arrest and deportation of Danish Jews until nearly all of them were warned and on their way to refuge in Sweden. In the end, 477 Danish Jews were deported, and 70 of them lost their lives, out of a pre-war total of Jews and half-Jews at a little over 8,000.

== Contemporary ==
Both Denmark and Germany are members of the European Union and NATO. The Bonn-Copenhagen declarations of 1955 establishes mutual recognition of the minorities on both side of the border, assures full civil rights and the right to establish schools teaching in the minority language. Additionally, the Danish Ministry of Education (Undervisningsministeret) cooperated with the Bundes state of Baden-Württemberg's ministry of education, Kultusministerium, to develop and carry out an exchange programme between gymnasium students in both countries. The official name of the programme is "Deutsch-Dänisches grenzenübergreifendes Schüleraustauschprogramm für die Entwicklung und den Beibehalt, essentieller kultureller Verständigung und prägenden Erfahrungen". The first exchange was officially carried out in April 2016 in the city of Mosbach, Baden-Württemberg. The second official exchange took place in Odense, Denmark, in May, followed by a third, but not final, successful visit in August 2016. Even though the programme is officially over, plans have been made for a comeback before the end of 2016.

=== Border control ===
In the context of the European migrant crisis, Denmark has been maintaining temporary border control on the Danish-German border since 4 January 2016, which has been repeatedly extended. As of April 2019, slightly more than 10 million people have been stopped, of which 7599 have been turned away. As of October 2018, 801 weapons have been confiscated and 5479 charges of, among other things, human trafficking and drug smuggling, have been brought. The police have been releasing weekly tallies of individuals checked, individuals denied entry and individuals charged with human trafficking.

== Resident diplomatic missions ==
- Denmark has an embassy in Berlin and consulates-general in Flensburg, Hamburg and Munich.
- Germany has an embassy in Copenhagen.
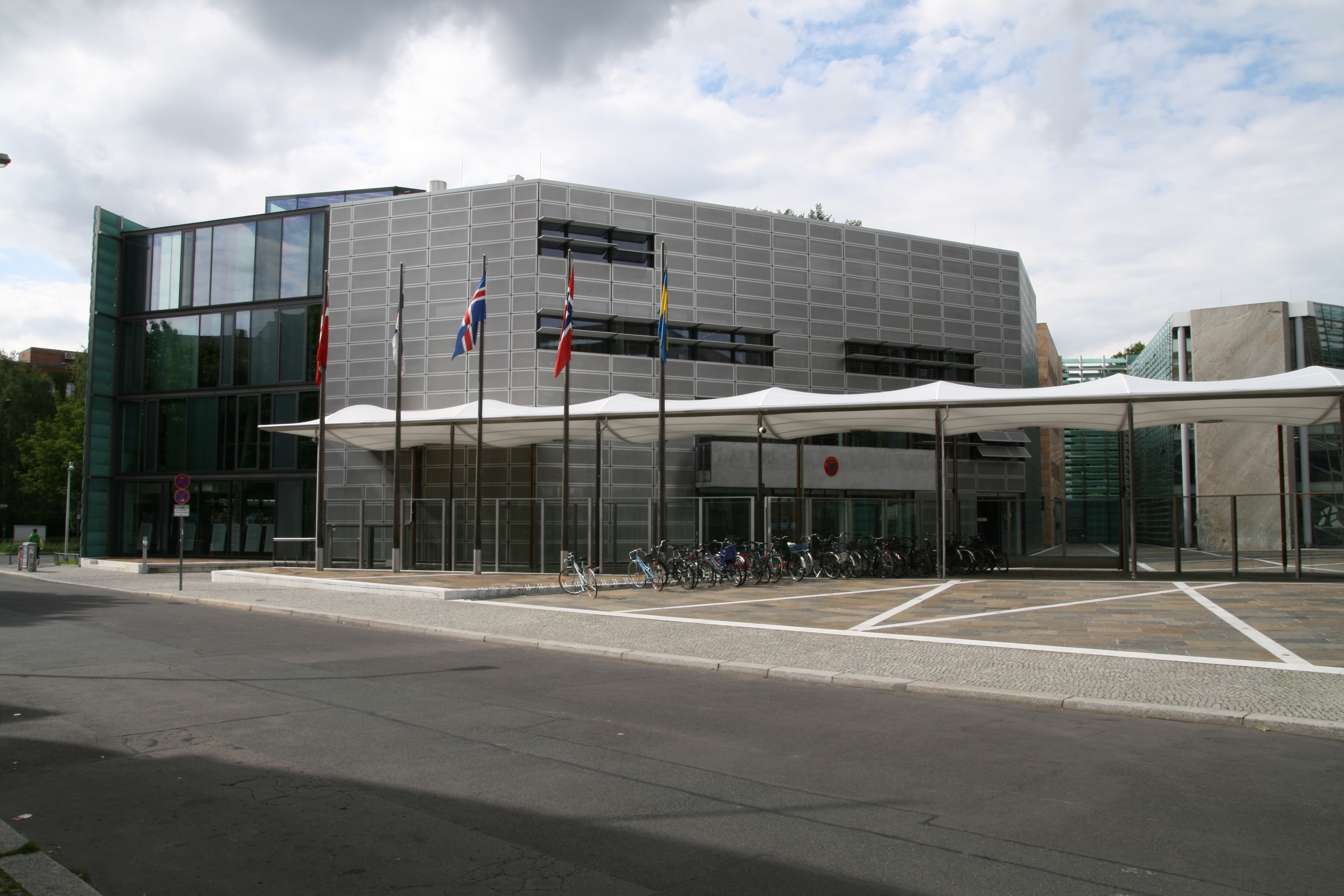
Embassy of Denmark in Berlin

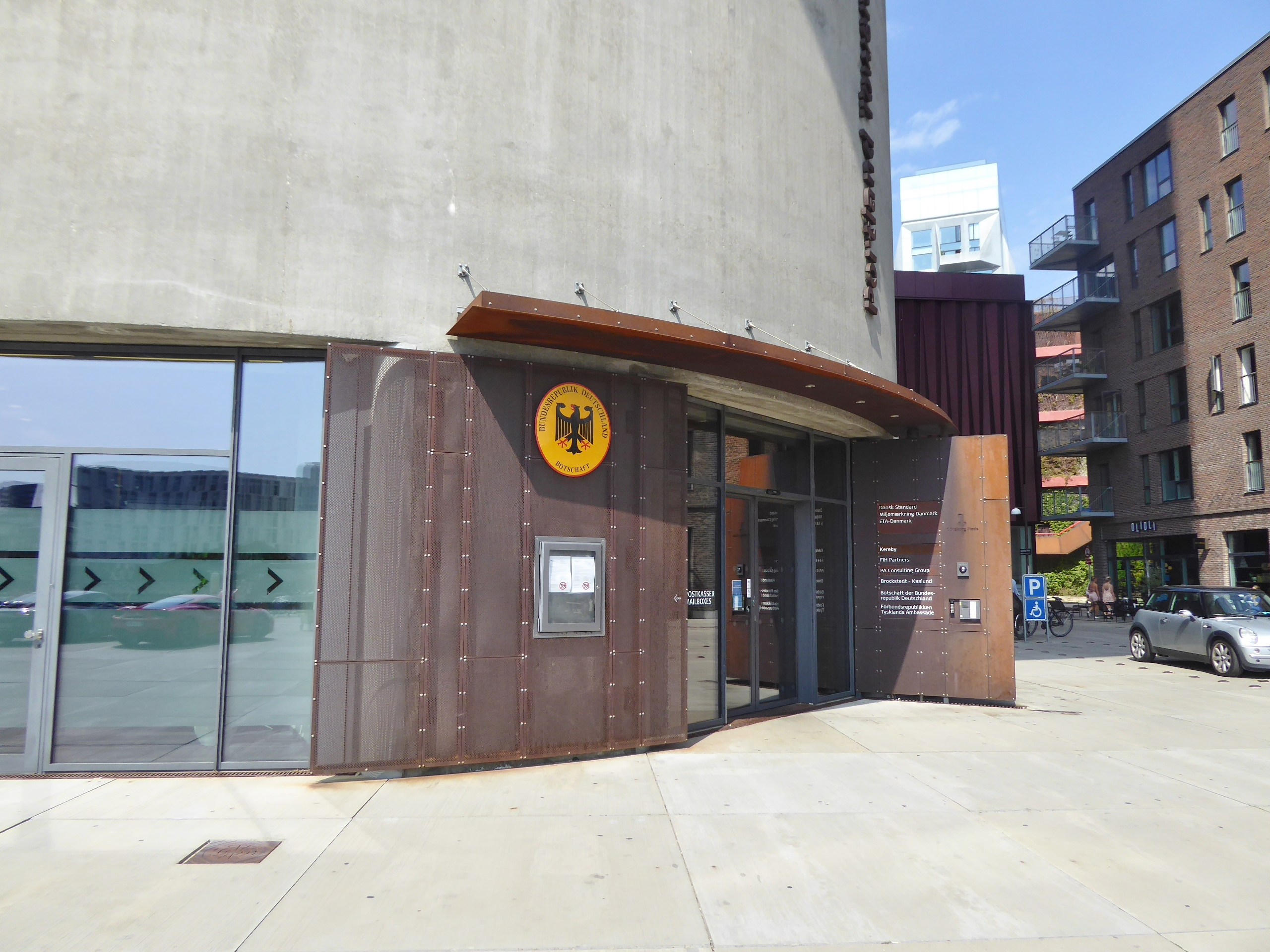
Embassy of Germany in Copenhagen

== See also ==
- Foreign relations of Denmark
- Foreign relations of Germany
- Operation Dunhammer
- German Parliamentary Committee investigation of the NSA spying scandal
