= German invasion of Denmark (1940) =

World War II military campaign

- Part of Operation Weserübung of World War II
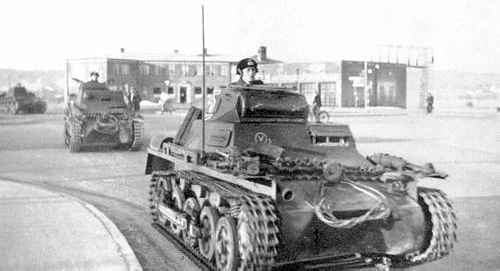
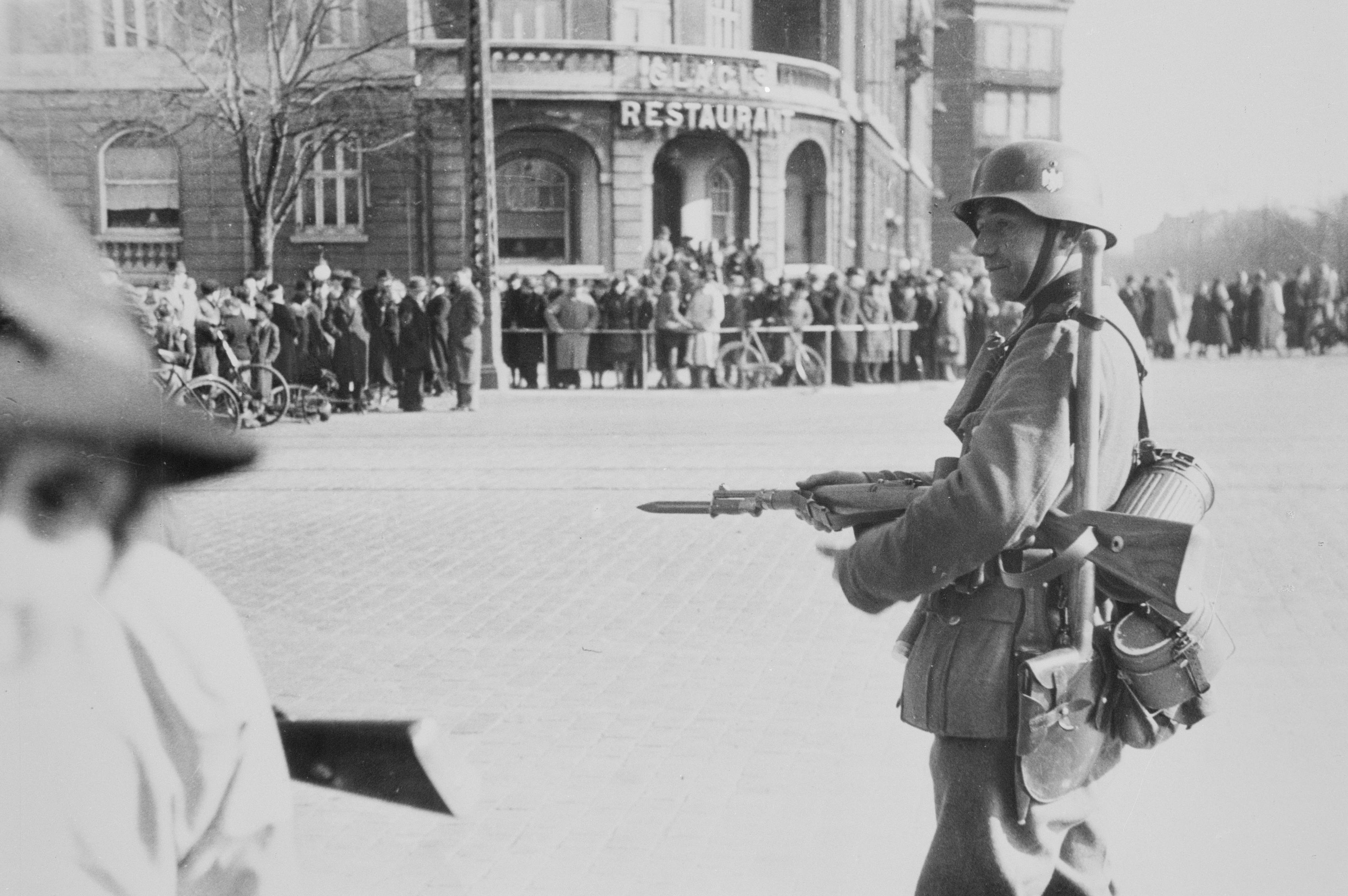
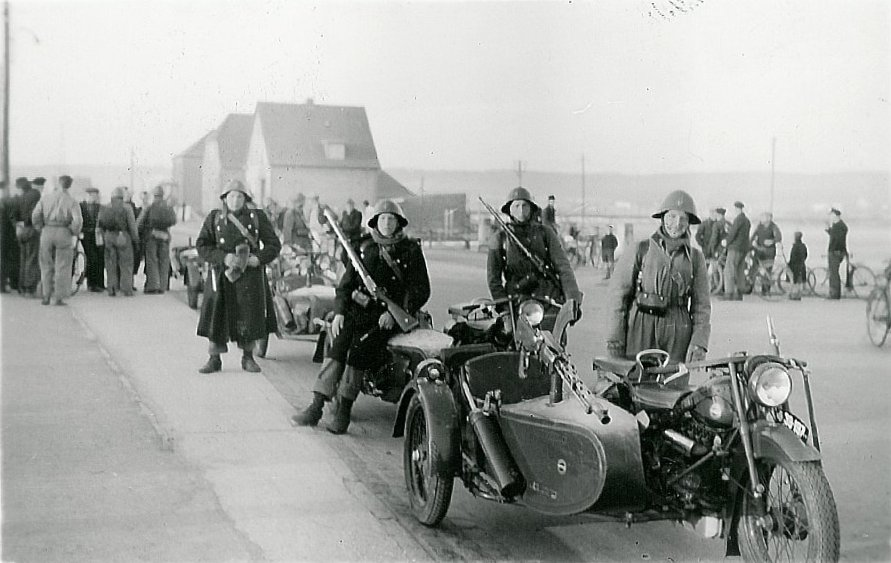
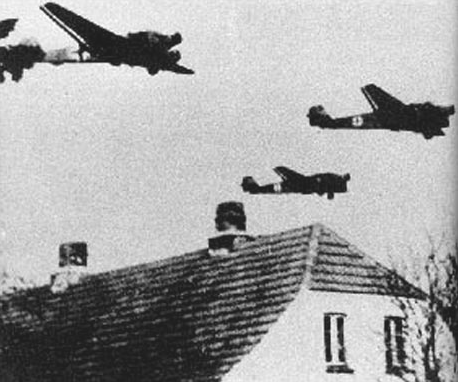
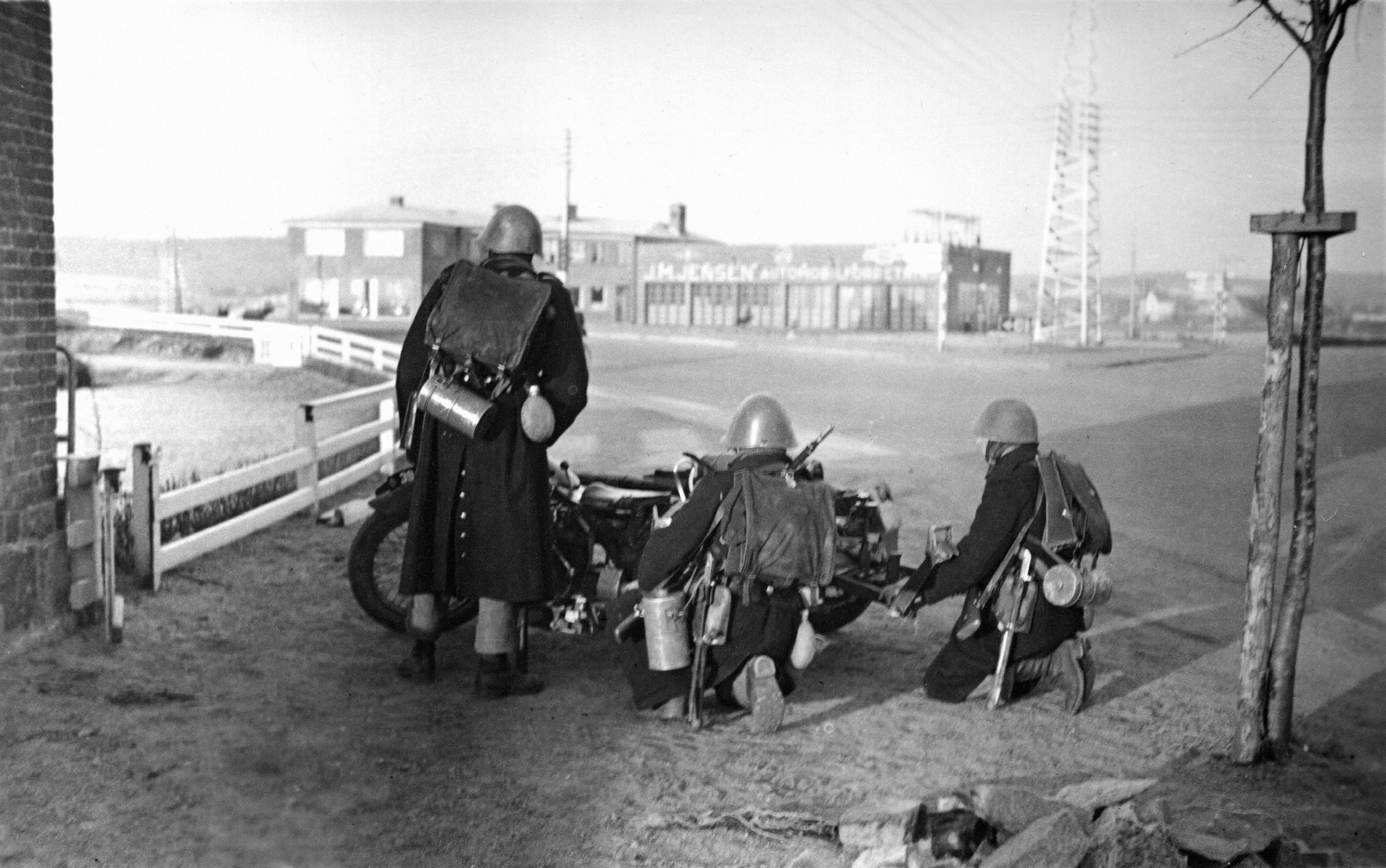
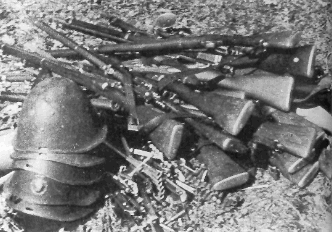
- German tanks in Åbenrå; German barricade at Østerbrogade; Junkers Ju 52 transport aircraft over Denmark; Weapons and helmets of the disarmed Danish soldiers; Danish position on the southern outskirts of Åbenrå; Danish motorcycle patrols in Åbenrå
Date	9 April 1940 (6 hours)
Location	Denmark
Result	German victory
Territorial changes	Germany occupies Denmark. To prevent German expansion, the United Kingdom invades and occupies both the Faroe Islands and Iceland while Greenland remained unoccupied under the possibility of seizure by the United Kingdom, United States or Canada

Belligerents
Germany	Denmark

Commanders and leaders
Leonhard Kaupisch	Christian X Thorvald Stauning; William Prior; Hjalmar Rechnitzer

Strength
Higher Command XXXI: 170th Infantry Division; 198th Infantry Division; 11th Schützen Brigade; 527 aircraft (of the X. Fliegerkorps)	14,500 soldiers (Zealand, Jutland divisions, & Bornholm garrison); 4 air force squadrons 2 coastal defence ships 6 torpedo boats 7 submarines 3 minelayers 9 minesweepers 4 inspection ships

Casualties and losses
Uncertain (see Casualties); 2 captured 4 tanks damaged 12 armoured cars destroyed or damaged 1 aircraft damaged 1 tugboat sunk 1 battleship grounded	16 killed 20 wounded 12 aircraft destroyed 14 aircraft damaged

Nazi Germany invaded Denmark on 9 April 1940, during the Second World War. The attack was a prelude to the invasion of Norway (Unternehmen Weserübung – Nord, 9 April – 10 June 1940).

Denmark's strategic importance was limited. The invasion's primary purpose was to use Denmark as a staging ground for operations against Norway, and to secure supply lines to the forces about to be deployed there. An extensive network of radar systems was built in Denmark to detect British bombers bound for Germany.

The attack on Denmark was a breach of the non-aggression pact Denmark had signed with Germany less than a year earlier. The initial plan was to push Denmark to accept that German land, naval and air forces could use Danish bases, but Adolf Hitler subsequently demanded that both Norway and Denmark be invaded.

Denmark's military forces were inferior in numbers and equipment, and after a short battle were forced to surrender. After less than two hours of struggle, Danish Prime Minister Thorvald Stauning ended the opposition to the German attack, for fear that the Germans would bomb Copenhagen (København), as they had done with Warsaw during the invasion of Poland in September 1939. Due to communication difficulties, some Danish forces continued to fight, but after a further two hours, all opposition had stopped.

Lasting approximately six hours, the German ground campaign against Denmark was one of the shortest military operations of the Second World War.

== Background ==
The attack on Denmark was part of Operation Weserübung Süd, Germany's plan for the invasion of Norway. Its main purpose was to secure the iron ore that shipped from Narvik. To capture Norway, the Germans had to control the port outside Aalborg in northern Jutland (Jylland). The Kriegsmarine high command approved of occupying Denmark to extend the German sea-defence network northward, making it harder for British ships to outflank it from the north when attacking ships in the Atlantic. Norway's fjords also provided excellent bases for German submarines in the North Atlantic. The Germans presented the invasion as an act of protection against a supposed imminent attack by the United Kingdom and France.

== German plan of attack ==
Map showing the German plans

The German High Command planned a combined assault on Denmark to overrun the country as swiftly as possible. It included an airborne assault on the Aalborg airfields, a surprise landing of infantry from naval auxiliaries at Copenhagen (København), and a simultaneous ground assault across the Jutland (Jylland) peninsula. On 4 April, Admiral Wilhelm Canaris, chief of the Abwehr and involved in the German resistance to Nazism, warned the Danes of an imminent invasion.

== Skirmishes ==
Although the Royal Danish Army was warned of the attack, it was denied permission to deploy or prepare defensive positions as the Danish government did not want to give the Germans any provocation for their actions. Only small and scattered units of the frontier guard and elements of the Jutland (Jylland) division were available to meet the land invasion. Believing the attack was imminent, the troops were placed on full alert at 13:30 on 8 April.

=== Fighting in Jutland ===
The Danish border was breached at Sæd, Rens, Padborg, and Krusaa (Kruså) at 04:15 on the 9th. With the Kriegsmarine simultaneously landing troops at Lillebælt, Danish troops at the border were cut off at the beginning of the fighting. The alarm was sounded at 04:17, and the first Danish troops were dispatched at 04:35.

==== Eastern flank ====
===== Lundtoftbjerg =====
The first clash between the Danish Army and the invading forces occurred at Lundtoftbjerg, where a Danish anti-tank platoon armed with two 20 mm guns and a light machine gun had taken up positions covering the road. A German column appeared at 04:50, and the 20 mm cannons opened fire on the armoured cars while the machine gun took aim at the motorcyclists. A fire started in a nearby barn, filling the air with smoke and hindering the German advance. Eventually the anti-tank platoon was forced to withdraw to Aabenraa. About 1.5 kilometres (0.93 mi) to the north, a bicycle platoon prepared a defence of a railway bridge, but fire from the armoured cars and strafing fighter aircraft forced them to retreat, and a third of them were captured. The Germans lost two armoured cars and three motorcycles, while the Danes suffered one dead and one wounded.

Another German column reached Hokkerup a few kilometres east of Lundtoftbjerg at 05:30. They encountered a roadblock made with farm equipment, set up only 20 minutes earlier by 34 Danish soldiers. The Danes knocked out the three leading armoured cars, forcing the remaining armoured cars to withdraw. The Germans set up a 37 mm gun 300 metres (330 yd) away, but it managed to fire only one round before being knocked out by two rounds from a 20 mm gun. Hand-to hand combat ensued in which one Dane was killed and three wounded, one fatally. With air support, the 100 or so Germans managed to surround and capture the Danish unit at 06:15.

===== Bjergskov =====
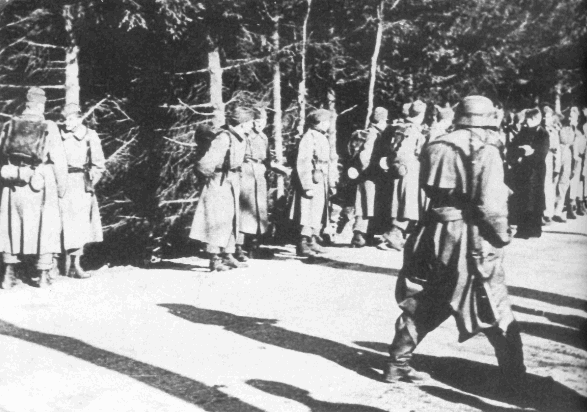
Danish POWs at Bjergskov

7 kilometres (4.3 mi) north of Lundtoftbjerg, one motorcycle and two bicycle platoons arrived at Bjergskov at around 05:00. Under Lieutenant Colonel S. E. Clausen the motorcycle troops set up a roadblock with two 20 mm guns while the remaining platoons spread out in the woods. A German column arrived at 06:30. Their tanks pushed the roadblock aside and opened fire. One gun returned fire until a tank drove over it. The gunner attempted to run for cover in the woods but was killed when a German aircraft strafed the road. The second gun malfunctioned. The Danes tried to escape on motorcycles but the Germans surrounded them with armoured vehicles and captured them. A further four Danish soldiers were wounded, while one German armoured car was damaged.

==== Central thrust ====
===== Bredevad =====
In an encounter between Danish and German forces at Bredevad, 10 kilometres (6.2 mi) north of the border, a German vanguard of four armoured cars approached the village. The Danes arrived at 6:30 AM and, without time to build a roadblock, took cover in a garden. A machine gun and a 20 mm cannon, manned by one and a half platoons, fired warning shots. When the Germans ignored this, the Danes opened fire from 300 meters (yards) out, knocking out the lead armoured car and killing its driver. A short skirmish followed. The Danes knocked out three more German armoured cars and suffered four casualties. At 07:15 a reinforcing German motorised column arrived from Tinglev, cutting off the Danes and forcing them to surrender. Two Danes were killed and five were wounded.

===== Rabsted =====
A cyclist platoon from Korskro arrived at Rabsted at 6:45. While lying in wait, they managed to capture two German dispatch riders. Learning from them that Bredevad had been taken, they retreated to the northeast via secondary roads.

===== Aabenraa =====
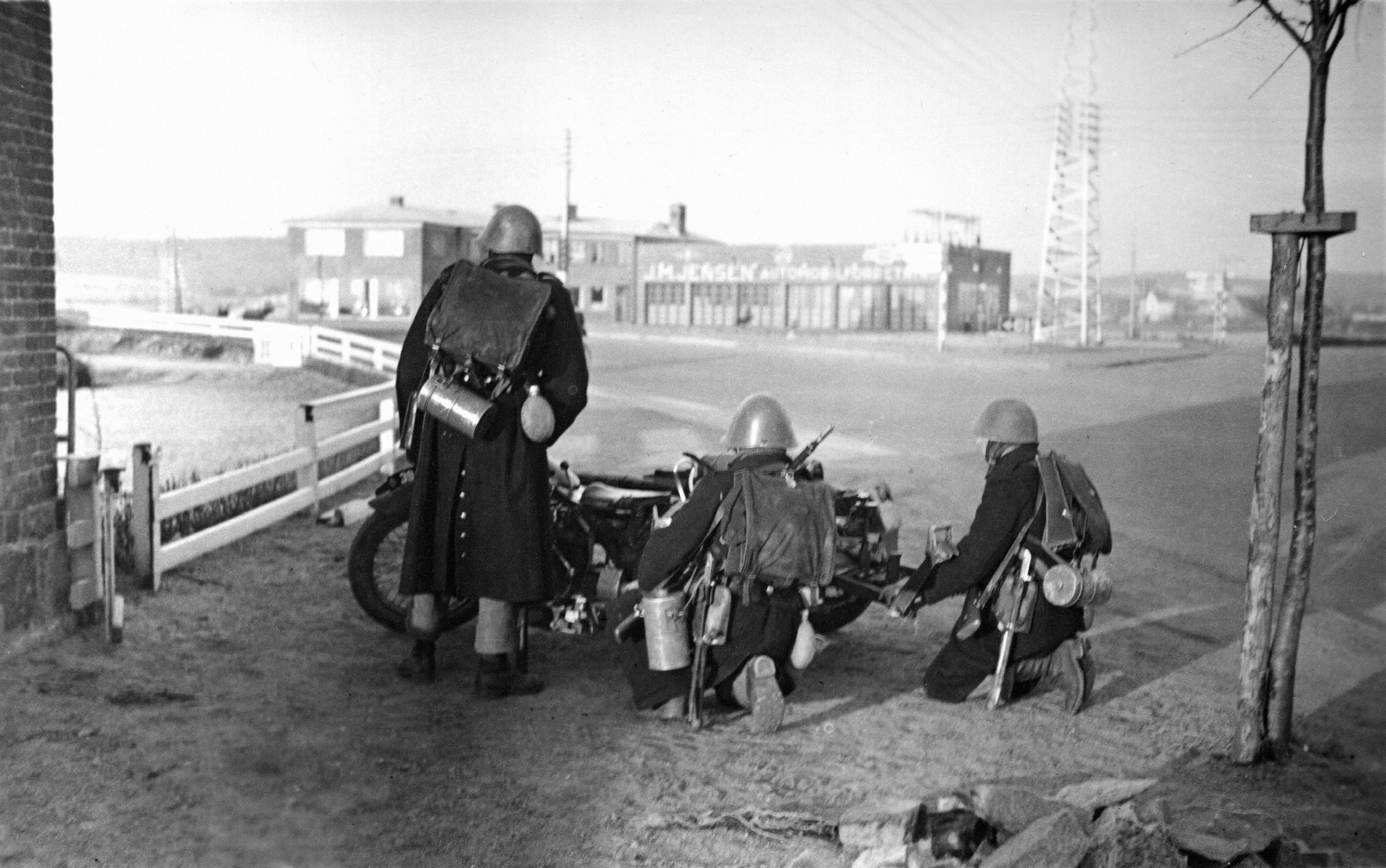
Danish soldiers with a Madsen 20 mm anti-tank gun at Aabenraa

As the Danish forces at Søgaard army camp prepared to pull back north to Vejle, where the main force of the Jutland (Jylland) Division was preparing for battle, a short skirmish occurred at Aabenraa as the anti-tank platoon from Lundtoftbjerg attacked 15 or so pursuing German vehicles. After disabling a German tank, the rearguard pulled back to Knivsberg. They rendezvoused with a bicycle platoon from Stubbæk Skov, which had suffered one killed and three wounded by German aircraft. The Danish CO ordered them to northern Haderslev.

===== Haderslev =====
Haderslev had a garrison of 225 men of the Jutland (Jylland) Division under Colonel A. Hartz, which defended both the barracks in the town and the road leading to it. Troops in the town mobilised at 07:00 on hearing instructions broadcast from police loudspeaker vans. Bolstered by retreating units, approximately 400 Danes defended the town. Three roadblocks were set up: one with dumping wagons, the other two from spare lumber.

At about 07:50 on the southern outskirts of Haderslev, a Danish 37 mm anti-tank gun with a crew of five attacked the approaching armour. Two German tanks lined up adjacent to one another and opened fire. The Danes landed all three of their shots—one in a tank's tracks—but two of the gun crew were killed and the rest wounded. One tank then drove over the gun. Around the curve on Sønderbro Street, two 20 mm cannon and a machine gun put up resistance at the wagon roadblock. The Germans laid down heavy fire. A Danish soldier was killed and two were wounded, but the Germans were effectively pinned down. The fighting continued for ten minutes until the order to surrender was received from Copenhagen (København) by telephone. The Germans were then allowed to proceed into Haderslev, but the Danish garrison stationed there had not received the order to surrender and fired on them. Two German tanks and a motorcycle proceeded unsuspecting towards the barracks, which were defended by the anti-tank unit from Lundtoftbjerg. They opened fire, killing the motorcyclist and blowing the tracks off one tank, sending it crashing into a house. However, the Danish garrison capitulated at 08:15 when the order to surrender finally came through. One Danish soldier was killed while defending the barracks, and three civilians were killed in the crossfire.

==== Western flank ====
===== Abild and Sølsted =====
The first fighting in Western Jutland (Jylland) occurred against the Tønder garrison, which was dispatched to Abild and Sølsted. At Abild, a Danish 20 mm gun crew knocked out two German armoured cars of the German 11th Motorised Regiment before pulling back. At Sølsted, a Danish anti-tank unit consisting of fewer than 50 men set up a defensive position with a 20 mm gun on a road. When a force of the German 11th Motorised Regiment approached, the Danes opened fire as soon as the first German armoured car came within range. The first vehicle was knocked out and ended up in a ditch, while the next continued forward, but pulled back after being hit. It was hit several more times, but was able to fire back. German infantry attempted twice to outflank the Danish positions, but both attempts were met with heavy fire and they became bogged down. Seeing that his attack was failing, the German regimental commander radioed for support and three German Henschel Hs 126 aircraft soon appeared. They bombed and strafed the Danish force until the Danish commander ordered his troops to fall back to Bredebo. In spite of this, no Danish casualties were reported. When the men of the Tønder garrison reached Bredebro, the order to capitulate had been issued and the fighting was over.

=== Airborne landings ===
At approximately 05:00, history's first paratrooper attack took place. 96 Fallschirmjäger jumped from nine Junkers Ju 52 transport aircraft to secure Storstrøm Bridge, connecting the island of Falster with Zealand (Sjælland) and the coastal fortress on Masnedø island. The elite German troops expected heavy fighting around the fortress, but much to their surprise, only two privates and an officer were found inside. The landing opened the way for a battalion of the 198. Infanterie-Division to advance on Copenhagen (København) by land.

Two hours later, a platoon of paratroopers from the 4th battalion of Fallschirmjäger Regiment I landed in Aalborg, the main city of northern Jutland (Jylland), to secure Weserübung Süd's primary target: the airfield at Aalborg, to be used as a stepping-stone for the invasion of Norway. The Fallschirmjäger's encountered no resistance, and in less than an hour German aircraft were landing there in huge numbers. More than 200 landings and takeoffs were recorded on the first day, most of them transporting troops and fuel to Fornebu Airport in Norway.

In Esbjerg, a 75mm anti-aircraft gun damaged a German aircraft.

=== Naval landings ===
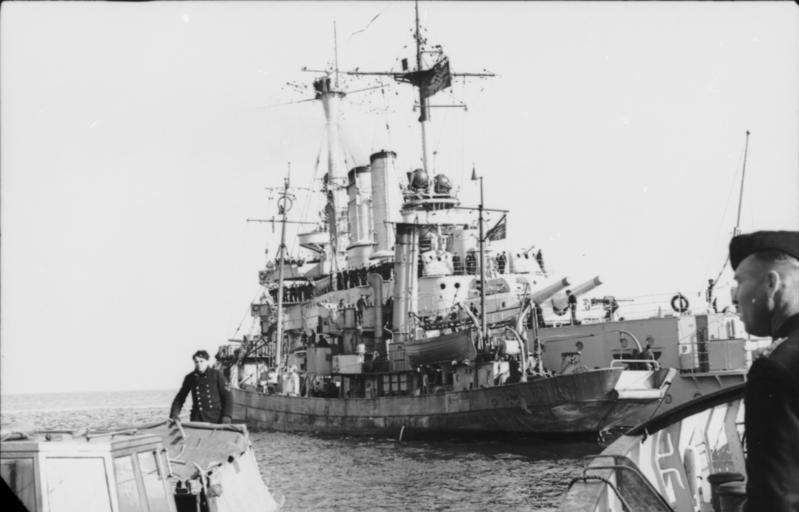
The German battleship Schleswig-Holstein at Korsør

In order to capture the connections between Jutland (Jylland) and Zealand (Sjælland), the Kriegsmarine landed more troops from the 198th Infantry Division at Funen (Fyn).

At the same time, troops supported by the battleship Schleswig-Holstein landed in Korsør and Nyborg, cutting off connections between Funen (Fyn) and Zealand (Sjælland). Meeting no resistance, the troops in Korsør reached Copenhagen (København) at noon.

Shortly earlier, at 03:55, the Germans made a surprise attack on Gedser, Denmark's southernmost city. They utilised the local ferry from Warnemünde, which they crammed with troops. Soldiers swarmed inland and cut telephone lines. Armour and motorcycles followed, and rapidly advanced to and captured the Storstrøm Bridge together with the paratroopers.

=== Capture of Copenhagen ===
To secure Denmark's quick surrender, the capture of the capital city was considered essential. At 04:20 the 2,430 ton minelayer Hansestadt Danzig, with an escort of the icebreaker Stettin and two patrol boats, entered Copenhagen (København) harbour with battle flags flying. The harbour was covered by the coastal artillery guns of Fort Middelgrund. The newly appointed Danish commander ordered a warning shot to be fired, but the recently arrived recruits could not operate the gun. After landing a battalion of the 198th Infantry at 05:18, German forces captured the 70-strong garrison of Kastellet, the Citadel of Copenhagen and the headquarters of the Danish Army, without a single shot. Their next target was Amalienborg Palace, residence of the Danish royal family.

==== Amalienborg and capitulation ====
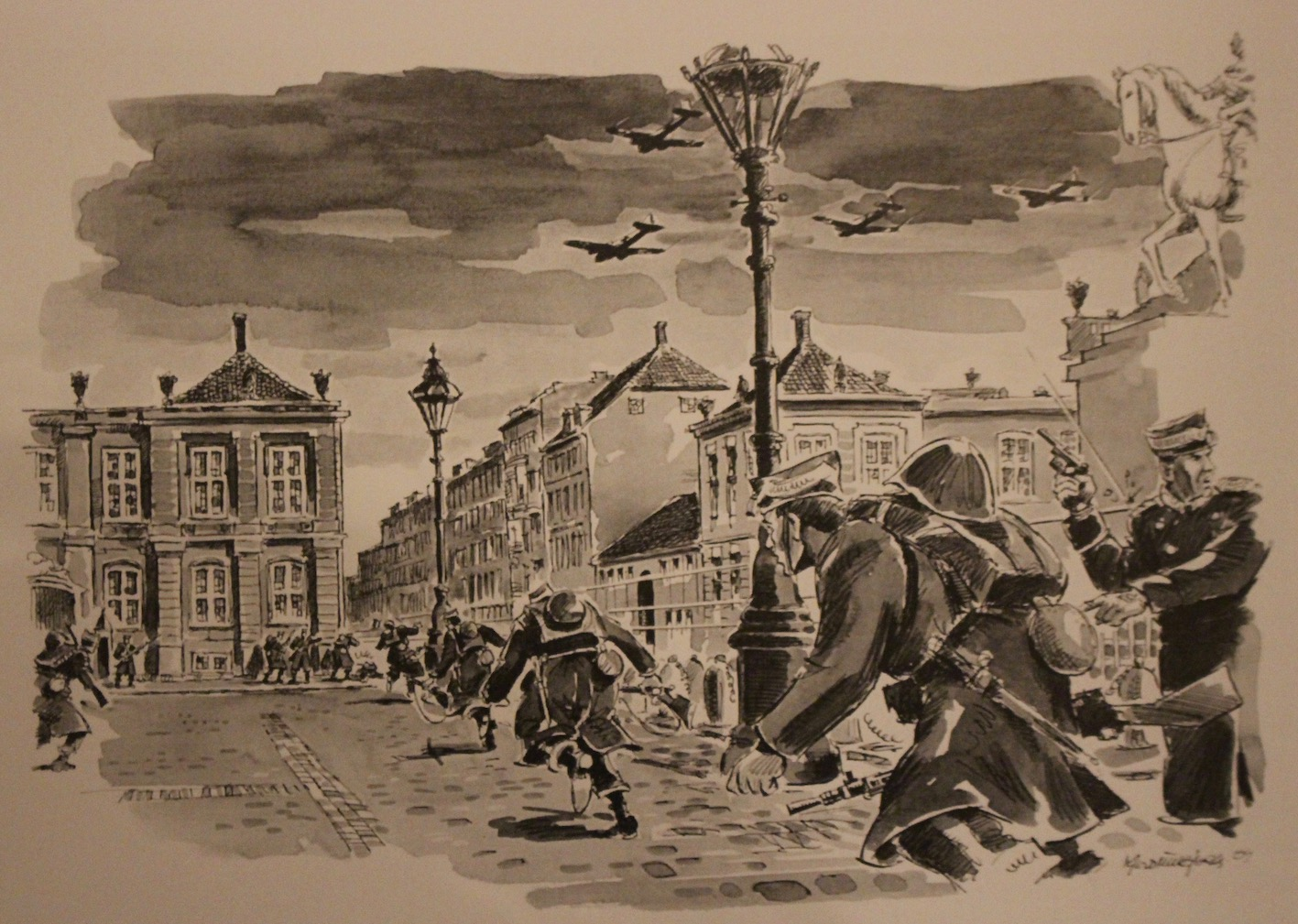
Illustrative depiction of the reinforcements from Rosenborg Barracks entering the fray

The 198th Infantry Battalion advanced on Amalienborg along three converging axes, Bredgade, Amaliegade, and Toldbodgade, intending to encircle the palace before a defence could be organised. Unbeknownst to them, the commandant of Kastellet, Christian Peter Bokkenheuser, had managed to raise the alarm with the Royal Guard in the final moments before his arrest. The Germans were therefore met almost immediately by fierce, disciplined resistance from the on-duty company, who awaited them already entrenched in firing positions. The initial assault was repulsed, leaving three Guardsmen and four Germans wounded. The situation then escalated as Danish reinforcements arrived from Rosenborg Barracks, bringing with them multiple Madsen machine guns. What followed was a chaotic and intense street battle that quickly spread across the entire quarter. Both sides probed for flanks, trading heavy fire through streets and passages, with the fiercest clashes raging along Bredgade, that ultimately brought the German advance to a complete halt.

The dogged resistance of the Royal Guard gave King Christian X and his ministers time to confer with the Danish commander-in-chief General Prior. During the discussions, several formations of Heinkel He 111 and Dornier Do 17 bombers from Kampfgeschwader 4 roared over the city dropping OPROP! leaflets. Faced with the explicit threat of Luftwaffe bombing Copenhagen's civilian population, all but General Prior favoured surrender. The argument for surrender was that Denmark's military position was untenable. Its land and population were too small to hold out against Germany for any sustained period, and its flat terrain would be easily overrun by German panzers. (Jutland (Jylland), for instance, was wide open to a panzer attack from Schleswig-Holstein to the south.) Unlike Norway, Denmark had no mountain ranges where a drawn-out resistance could be mounted. On the other hand, Denmark had significant water obstacles between the panzers and the capital city, Copenhagen (København), a long coastline, and a significant navy that could expect help from Great Britain and France. A third option, the government going into exile as the Czechoslovak government had done, was not chosen, in part because the King and the Crown Prince profoundly refused to leave the Crown Princess behind as she was in the closing days of pregnancy and therefore immobile (she actually gave birth exactly one week later to their oldest child). The Danish government ordered a ceasefire at 06:00, and formally capitulated at 08:34 in exchange for retaining political independence in domestic matters.

The decision to stand down and disarm the Royal Guard caused outrage among the Guardsmen, who firmly believed that they could successfully expel the Germans from the capital. This frustration boiled over into an uproar, during which the Guardsmen attempted to rearm themselves to launch a direct assault on Kastellet, where the Germans had positioned their temporary headquarters. However, the officers argued that even if the Guardsmen were able to drive out the initial German troops, more overwhelming forces would inevitably arrive soon after. As a result of these discussions, the Guardsmen eventually abandoned their efforts to resist the Germans.

=== Fate of the Danish Air Services ===
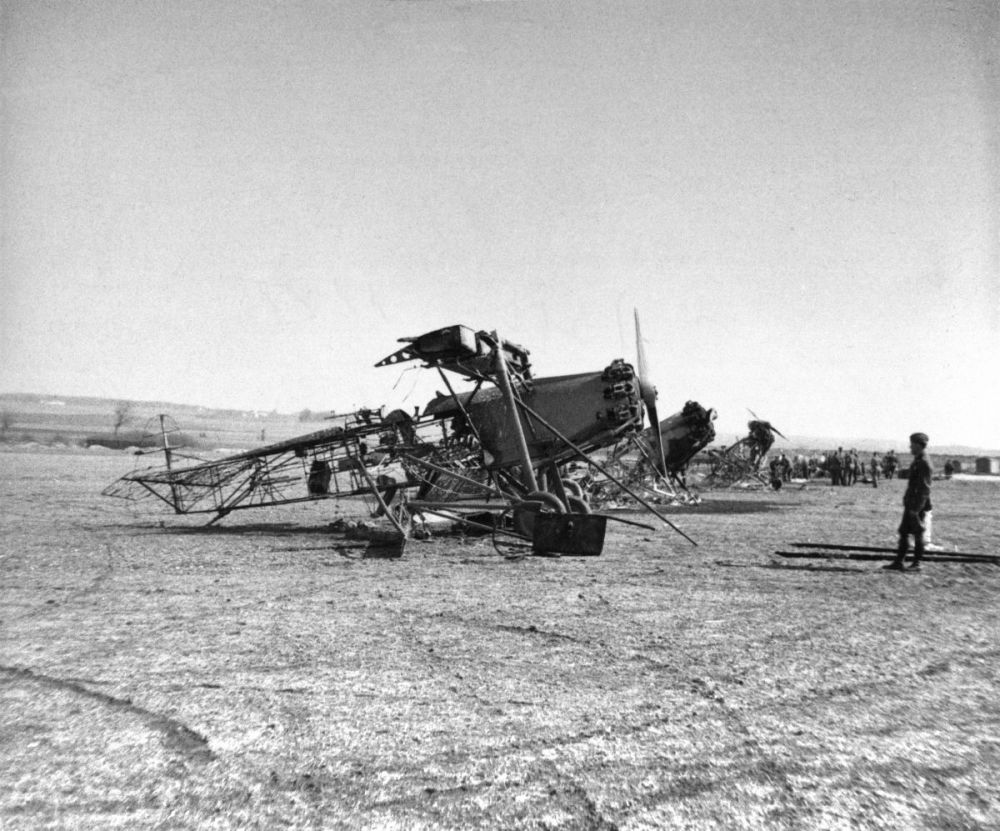
Danish Fokker C.Vs destroyed at Værløse

The entire four squadron Danish Army Air Service was stationed at Værløse near Copenhagen (København). In anticipation of the German invasion, they had prepared to disperse to airfields around the country, but this had not been accomplished by 05:25 when Luftwaffe aircraft appeared over the airbase. As the German aircraft reached Værløse, one Fokker C.V-E reconnaissance aircraft was getting airborne, but was shot down by a Messerschmitt Bf 110 flown by Hauptmann Wolfgang Falck at an altitude of 50 metres (160 ft). Both crew members were killed. The German Bf 110s then strafed the base under heavy anti-aircraft fire. They destroyed 11 aircraft and badly damaged another 14 as they taxied to take-off, wiping out most of the Danish Army Air Service in one action. The Danish Navy Air Service remained at its bases and escaped damage.

=== 1st company of the 11th battalion ===
While most of the Danish Army followed the order to surrender, one unit refused. Colonel Helge Bennike, commander of the 4th Regiment at Roskilde, believed that the order to surrender had been forced on the government by the Germans and that Sweden had also been attacked. Bennike and his unit boarded the ferry in Elsinore to Sweden and went into exile. When the misunderstanding was later cleared up, most of the Danish soldiers stayed in Sweden and would form the core of the Danish Brigade in Sweden in 1943.

=== Casualties ===
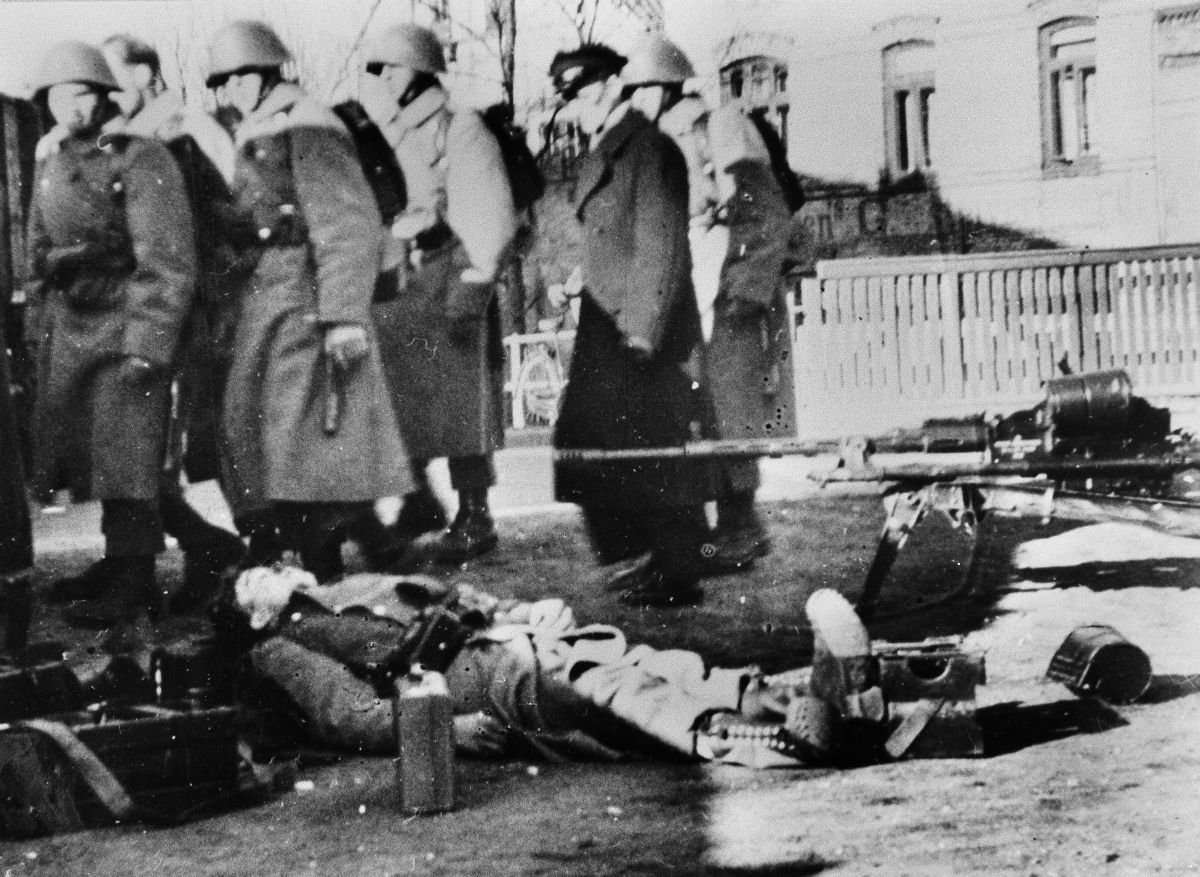
A Danish soldier lies dead by the roadblock in Haderslev.

For propaganda purposes, the German High Command tried to present the invasion of Denmark as a peaceful one, so it would be believed that Denmark did not put up any resistance to it.

In his first monograph, author Kay Søren Nielsen states that in the archives of the Danish weapons manufacturer DISA (Danish Industrial Syndicate), 203 German soldiers were claimed to be killed in Jutland (Jylland). This number is also backed up by testimonies from veterans and eyewitnesses, including the veteran Frode Jensen, who after the battle was over, was told by the Germans, that they had lost 18 men while his unit had only suffered 2 casualties.

However, the number is considered an exaggeration by many historians.

In 2015, the Journal of Military History, Krigshistorisk Tidsskrift, published an article for the Royal Danish Defence College in which military correspondent Lt. Col Jürgensen H.J. (ret.) summarised key points in the German invasion. He argued that actual German losses were 2–3 killed and 25–30 wounded, and that the Danish military suffered a confirmed 16 dead and 20 wounded. Casualties among the civil resistance is not certain, but are given as 10 dead and 3 wounded.

Military historian David T. Zabecki notes in "Germany at War: 400 Years of Military History" that Denmark suffered 49 casualties (26 killed and 23 wounded), and that 20 German soldiers were killed or wounded.

Other than the casualties at the front, a few aircraft were shot down or crashed, a tugboat sank after a collision with a German vessel in the Great Belt and the German battleship Schleswig-Holstein was temporarily grounded west of Agersø.

== Order of battle ==
Order of battle for both the Royal Danish Army and German Army:

=== Royal Danish Army ===
Royal Danish Army

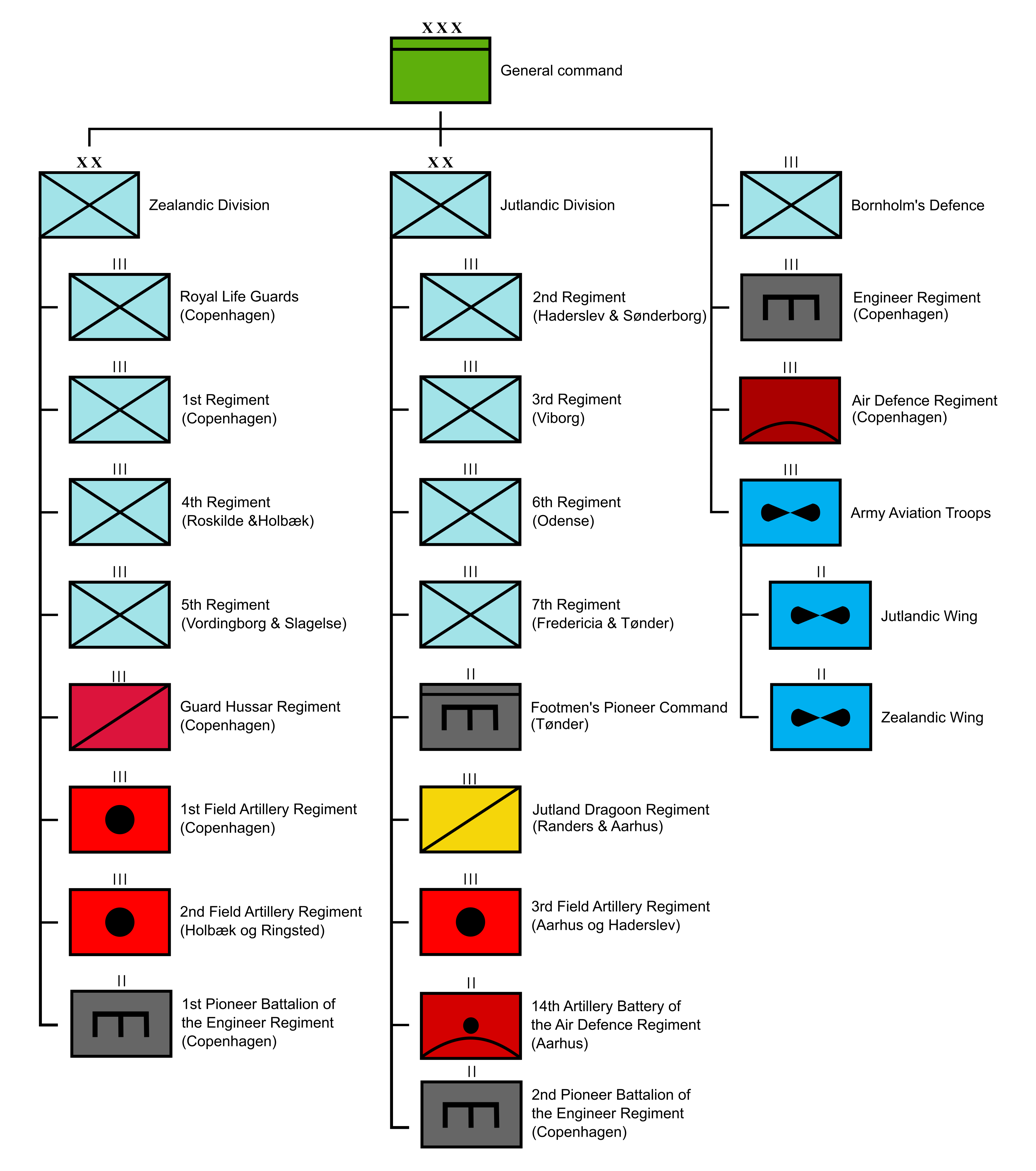
Structure of the Royal Danish Army, 9 April 1940

- Headquarters under Lieutenant general William Wain Prior at Copenhagen
  - 1st (Zealand) Infantry Division
    - Headquarters – Copenhagen
    - Life Guards
      - Headquarters – Copenhagen
      - 1st Battalion
      - 2nd Battalion
      - 3rd Battalion
    - 1st Infantry Regiment
      - Headquarters – Copenhagen
      - 1st Battalion
      - 15th Battalion
      - 21st Battalion
      - 24th Battalion
    - 4th Infantry Regiment
      - Headquarters – Roskilde
      - 8th Battalion – Holbæk
      - 11th Battalion – Roskilde
      - 17th Battalion – Præstø
      - 28th Battalion – Roskilde
      - Infantry Artillery Company – Roskilde
    - 5th Infantry Regiment
      - Headquarters – Vordingborg
      - 7th Battalion
      - 14th Battalion – Slagelse
      - 19th Battalion
      - 25th Battalion
    - Guard Hussar Regiment
      - Headquarters – Copenhagen
      - 1st Battalion
      - 2nd Battalion
      - 3rd Battalion
    - 1st Motorised Artillery Regiment
      - Headquarters -Avedørelejren
      - 1st Field Battalion
      - 2nd Heavy Field Battalion
      - 6th Heavy Field Battalion
    - 2nd Motorised Artillery Regiment
      - Headquarters – Holbæk
      - 4th Field Battalion
      - 5th Field Battalion
      - 11th Field Battalion
      - 12th Field Battalion
    - 13th Anti-Aircraft Artillery Battalion – Copenhagen
    - 1st Engineer Battalion – Copenhagen
  - 2nd (Jutland) Infantry Division
    - Headquarters – Viborg
    - 2nd Infantry Regiment
      - Headquarters – Sønderborg
      - 3rd Battalion – Sønderborg
      - 13th Battalion – Haderslev
      - 18th Battalion – Sønderborg
      - 22nd Battalion – Haderslev
      - Infantry Artillery Company – Haderslev
    - 3rd Infantry Regiment
      - Headquarters – Viborg
      - 6th Battalion
      - 9th Battalion
      - 20th Battalion
      - 23rd Battalion
    - 6th Infantry Regiment
      - Headquarters – Odense
      - 4th Bicycle Infantry Battalion – Søgaard
      - 5th Battalion
      - 16th Battalion
      - 26th Battalion
    - 7th Infantry Regiment
      - Headquarters – Frederica
      - 2nd Battalion – Tønder
      - 10th Battalion – Frederica
      - 12th Battalion – Sønderborg
      - 27th Battalion – Frederica
    - Jutland Dragoon Regiment
      - Headquarters – Randers
      - 1st Cavalry Squadron – Randers
      - 2nd Cavalry Squadron – Randers
      - Armoured Reconnaissance Squadron – Aarhus
      - 1st Bicycle Reconnaissance Squadron – Aarhus
      - 2nd Bicycle Reconnaissance Squadron – Aarhus
      - 3rd Bicycle Reconnaissance Squadron – Aarhus
    - 3rd Field Artillery Regiment
      - Headquarters – Aarhus
      - 3rd Field Battalion
      - 7th Heavy Field Battalion
      - 8th Field Battalion
      - 9th Field Battalion
    - 14th Anti-Aircraft Battalion
    - Jydske Engineer Regiment
    - Infantry Pioneer Command
      - Headquarters
      - 1st Pioneer Engineer Battalion
      - 2nd Pioneer Engineer Battalion
  - Army Aviation Troops
    - Zealand Group
      - Headquarters – Værløse
      - 1st Fighter Interceptor Squadron
      - 3rd Reconnaissance Squadron
    - Jutland Group
      - Headquarters – Værløse
      - 2nd Transporter-Bomber Squadron
      - 5th Reconnaissance Squadron
    - Værløse Supply Base Group
    - Værløse Training Base
  - Air Defence Regiment
  - Engineer Regiment
  - Bornholm Defense Force
  - Signal Regiment
  - Service Troops

=== Heer ===
German Army

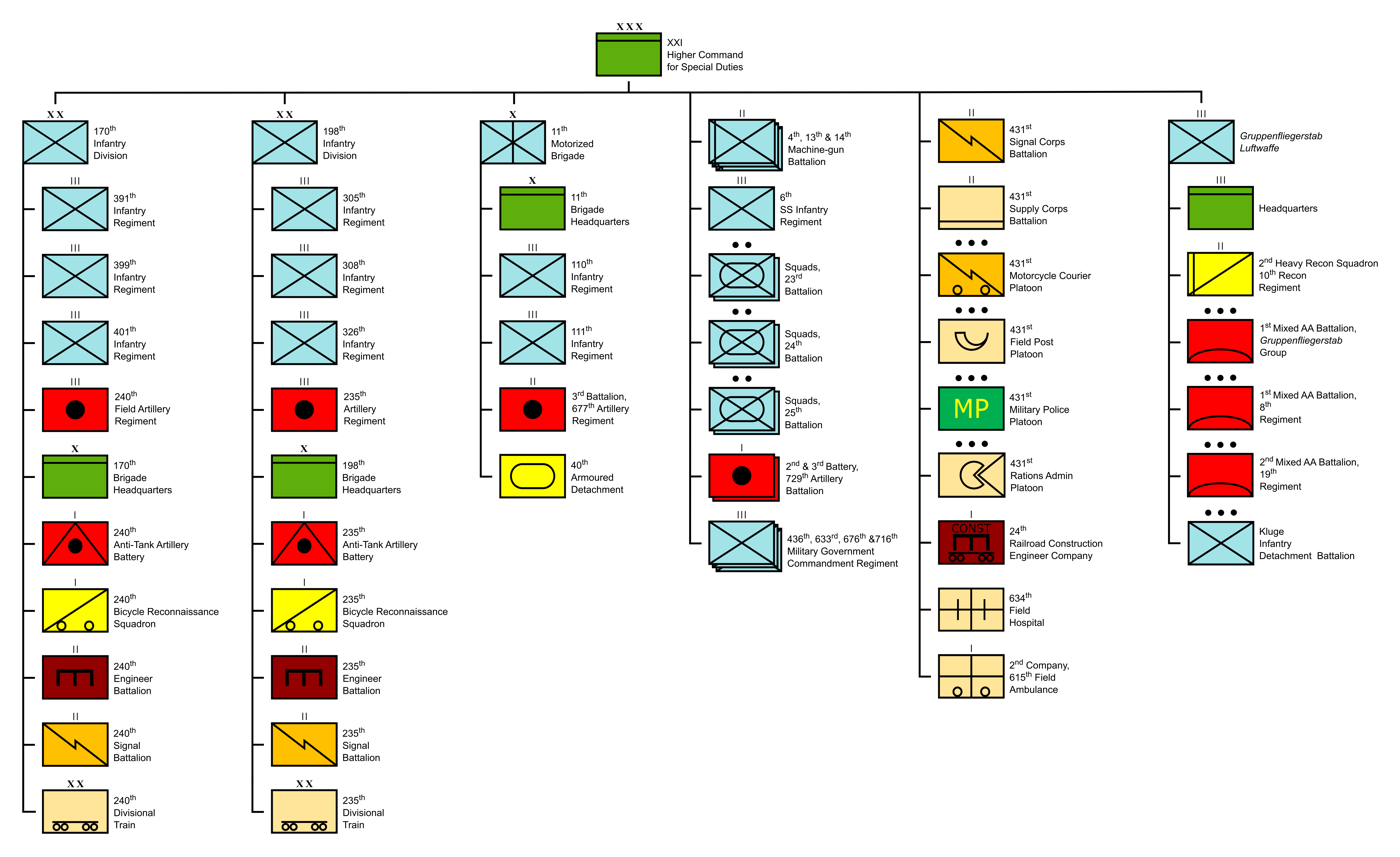
Structure of the German Army, 9 April 1940

- Headquarters under XXXI Corps Denmark Command
  - 170th Infantry Division
    - 391st Infantry Regiment
      - Headquarters Company
      - 1st Battalion
      - 2nd Battalion
      - 3rd Battalion
    - 399th Infantry Regiment
      - Headquarters Company
      - 1st Battalion
      - 2nd Battalion
      - 3rd Battalion
      - 2nd Battalion, 602nd Transport Battalion
    - 401st Infantry Regiment
      - Headquarters Company
      - 1st Battalion
      - 2nd Battalion
    - 240th Field Artillery Regiment
      - Headquarters Battery
      - 1st Battalion
      - 2nd Battalion
      - 3rd Battalion
    - 170th Brigade Headquarters
    - 240th Anti-Tank Artillery Battery
    - 240th Bicycle Reconnaissance Squadron
    - 240th Engineer Battalion
    - 240th Signal Battalion
    - 240th Divisional Train
  - 198th Infantry Division
    - 305th Infantry Regiment
      - Headquarters Company
      - 1st Battalion
      - 2nd Battalion
      - 3rd Battalion
    - 308th Infantry Regiment
      - Headquarters Company
      - 1st Battalion
      - 2nd Battalion
      - 3rd Battalion
    - 326th Infantry Regiment
      - Headquarters Company
      - 1st Battalion
      - 2nd Battalion
    - 235th Artillery Regiment
      - Headquarters Battalion
      - 1st Battalion
      - 2nd Battalion
      - 3rd Battalion
    - 198th Brigade Headquarters
    - 235th Anti-Tank Artillery Battery
    - 235th Bicycle Reconnaissance Squadron
    - 235th Engineer Battalion
    - 235th Signal Battalion
    - 235th Divisional Train
  - 11th Motorised Brigade
    - 11th Brigade Headquarters
    - 110th Infantry Regiment
      - Headquarters
      - 1st Battalion
      - 2nd Battalion
      - 110th Motorcycle Company
      - 110th Transport Detachment
    - 111th Infantry Regiment
      - Headquarters
      - 1st Battalion
      - 2nd Battalion
      - 111th Motorcycle Company
      - 111th Transport Detachment
    - 3rd Battalion, 677th Artillery Regiment
    - 40th Armoured Detachment
  - Direct Controlled Corps Units
    - 4th Machine-Gun Battalion
    - 13th Machine-Gun Battalion
    - 14th Machine-Gun Battalion
    - 6th SS Infantry Regiment
    - 2x Squads – 23rd Panzer Battalion
    - 2x Squads – 24th Panzer Battalion
    - 2x Squads – 25th Panzer Battalion
    - 2nd Battery, 729th Artillery Battalion
    - 3rd Battery, 729th Artillery Battalion
    - 431st Signal Corps Battalion
    - 431st Supply Corps Battalion
    - 431st Motorcycle Courier Platoon
    - 431st Field Post Platoon
    - 431st Military Police Platoon
    - 431st Rations Admin Platoon
    - 24th Railroad Construction Engineer Company
    - 634th Field Hospital
    - 2nd Company, 615th Field Ambulance
    - 676th Military Government Commandment Regiment
    - 436th Military Government Commandment Regiment
    - 633rd Military Government Commandment Regiment
    - 716th Military Government Commandment Regiment
  - Gruft Luftwaffe Regiment
    - Headquarters
    - 2nd Heavy Reconnaissance Squadron, 10th Reconnaissance Regiment
    - 1st Mixed Anti-Aircraft Battalion, Gruft Group
    - 1st Mixed Anti-Aircraft Battalion, 8th Regiment
    - 2nd Mixed Anti-Aircraft Battalion, 19th Regiment
    - Kluge Infantry Detachment Battalion

== Aftermath and legacy ==
Once the invasion was underway, the German government issued a communiqué to the Danish government, telling it to cooperate with German forces and face a "peaceful" occupation. The Danes capitulated within six hours, resulting in a uniquely lenient occupation, as the Germans were content to leave the Aryan Danes to manage their own affairs. Danish soldiers were disarmed that afternoon, and those captured were allowed to return to their units. The following day, the island of Bornholm was occupied without incident. The Royal Danish Army was severely reduced after the invasion, with only a 3,300-strong "Life Guard" unit allowed to remain. Many Danish merchant ships were caught out abroad following the sudden and rapid invasion. Approximately 240 of these ships were incorporated into the Allied merchant navy while ships still in Danish ports served the Germans in transporting iron ore. A handful of Danish soldiers and pilots escaped to the United Kingdom either directly by plane or via neutral Sweden. Those who escaped either served amongst the RAF or SOE.

Following the reported peaceful occupation of Denmark, Allied views on Denmark were contemptuous. It was alleged that a boxing commentator had said "without fighting—like a Dane" concerning a first-round knockout. Danes have since adopted the saying "Aldrig mere 9 April" (transl. Never again an April 9).

== See also ==
- List of Danish military equipment of World War II
- List of German military equipment of World War II
- April 9th, a 2015 Danish film about Danish bicycle infantry during the German invasion
