= General Staff (Denmark) =

Chief of the General Staff
- Chefen for Generalstaben
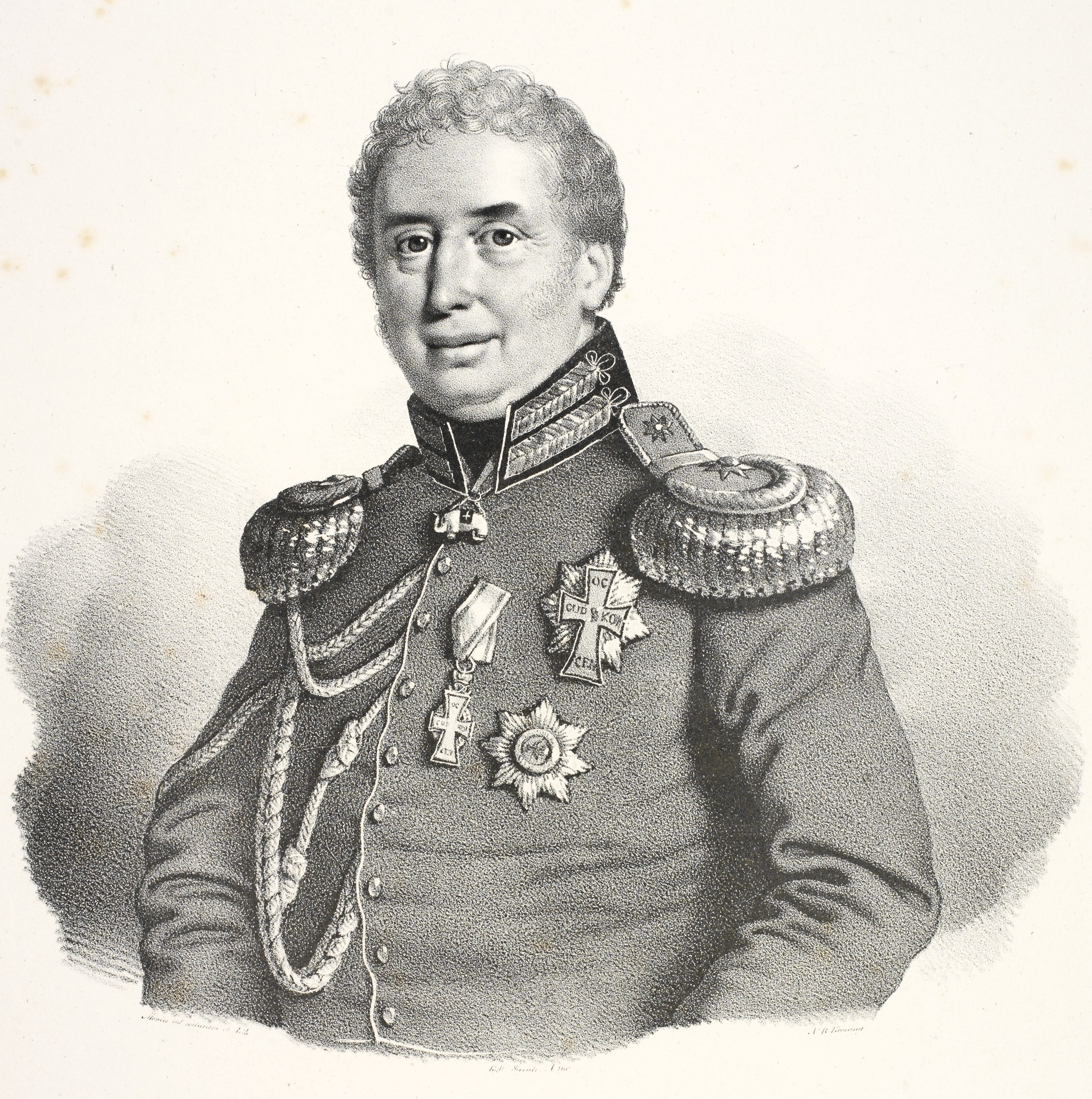
- Longest serving Frantz Bülow; 20 January 1808–30 December 1839
- Royal Danish Army
- Abbreviation: CH.f.Gst.
- Reports to: Minister of War (1848–1932); Chief of the General Command (1932–1950)
- Term length: Not fixed
- Formation: 20 January 1808
- First holder: Frantz Bülow
- Final holder: Erik C.V. Møller
- Abolished: 30 September 1950
- Succession: Chief of the Army Command

The General Staff of Denmark was a top authority in the Royal Danish Army and was responsible for war preparations (training and education), studies and planning.

Additionally, the Staff also wrote the regulations and historical works. Following the placement under the General Command in 1932, it took over its daily administration. There were two departments within the General Staff, the Command department which stood for the daily administration, and the General Staff department responsible for war preparations.

In times of war, General Staff personnel would join command staffs and serve as advisors during military operations.

== History ==
The idea behind of the General Staff appeared around the ending of the 18th century and the beginning of the 19th century, as there was an increased need for organization within the army. Previously, general staffs were only created in times of war and field commanders were handed staff officers, who lacked proper staff training. On 20 January 1808, the General Adjutant and General Quartermaster Staff was established with Frantz Bülow as Adjutant General and its overall chief. As such, there were two staffs directly below the highest commanding general:

- The General Adjutant Staff, which was responsible for personnel, questions regarding the operations and administrative cases.
- The General Quartermaster Staff, which stood for providing topographical and statistical information regarding terrain and population, supervision of constructions, education, administrate accommodation and rations.

Initially, staff officers were selected on the basis on who was considered best, without any preparatory education. However, in 1830, following the creation of the Royal Military College, the graduation exam became an admission condition. Education of officers were focused on military history & tactics, and technical and scientific subjects. Slowly, the latter subjects became more prevalent, with topographical work taking up the largest amount, causing internal friction.

In 1839, following the dismissal of Bülow, the Adjutant Staff was drastically reduced, making the Quartermaster General the chief of the whole staff. As part of the army organization plan of 1842, the Adjutant Staff was finally split from the organization and renamed as "His Majesty the King's Adjutant Staff". Additionally, it was decided that of the 30 members of the General Staff, five would also serve in the Adjutant Staff and the three General Commands. (Note: 1st, 2nd and 3rd General Command.)

Shortly before the outbreak of the First Schleswig War, the rations service and equipment administration was subjugated the newly established Ministry of War.

In 1856, the disproportionally large Topographical Department caused so much in fighting, that it was moved to the Ministry of Finance. However, all communication still had to go through the Chief of the General Staff. This created unnecessary bureaucracy, leading to the removal of the position of the Chief of the General Staff. As a result, there were no chief during the Second Schleswig War, with the rest of the staff having a minor role during the war.

=== Reestablishment ===
During the war, it was however made clear there was a high demand for young officers with formal General Staff training, since much of the training at the Royal Military College had been focused on the sciences. As such, work was started to recreate the General Staff. The Topographical Department was moved back into the staff, however there were structural changes which ensured there would not be a too large focus on the department.

Following the appointment of Ludolph Fog, there were an increased focus on gaining more influence within the army's leadership. The General Staff therefore produced a complete mobilization plan and began regularly holding "General Staff exercises".

=== World Wars ===
During World War I, the General Staff joined with the 1st General Command's staff, to form the Supreme Command Staff as to support the Supreme Command. After the war, cuts to the army resulted in the closure of the General Commands, and the creation of a peacetime supreme command. While the General Staff kept its special status under the Ministry of War, everything that pertained to the preparation for the overall land defense were subjugated the Chief of the General Command.

Following the 1932 Defence Agreement, the General Staff ceased to be an independent institution below the Ministry. The General Staff was instead place as a subordinate to the General Command and served as its staff. This new organization, meant the role of the General Staff was codified in peace and war.

A few days after the occupation of Denmark, the General Staff began to establish illegal contact with the SOE, as to provide intelligence. After Operation Safari, operations were forced moved to Sweden under the "Small General Staff".

After the war, the General Staff was responsible for the rebuilding of the Army, while ensuring it was modernized. The 1951 Defence Agreement meant major restructuring for the army and the General Staff was renamed the Army Staff.

== List of chiefs ==
No.	Portrait	Name (born–died)	Term of office			Ref.
No.	Portrait	Name (born–died)	Took office	Left office	Time in office	Ref.
1		Lieutenant general Frantz Bülow (1769–1844) as Chief of the General Adjutant and General Quartermaster Staff	20 January 1808	30 December 1839	31 years, 344 days	
2		Lieutenant general Pierre-Frédéric Steinmann (1769–1844)	30 December 1839	3 June 1852	12 years, 2 days	
3		Major general Carl Julius Flensborg (1804–1852)	3 June 1852	23 July 1852 #	50 days	
–		Major general August Baggesen (1795–1865)	23 July 1852	2 April 1854	1 year, 253 days	
4		Major general August Baggesen (1795–1865)	2 April 1854	26 June 1858	4 years, 85 days	
Position of Chief of the General staff abolished 1858–1867
–		Colonel; Heinrich Kauffmann (1819–1905) acting	2 December 1864	1 April 1865	120 days	
–		General (Note: Part of the Army Reform of 1867 removed ranks of Major, Lieutenant Colonel and kept only a single "General" rank.); Frederik Stiernholm (1822–1879)	1 April 1865	26 September 1867	2 years, 178 days	
5		General; Frederik Stiernholm (1822–1879)	26 September 1867	21 April 1879	11 years, 207 days	
6		General; Ludolph Fog (1825–1897)	21 April 1879	4 October 1887	8 years, 166 days	
7		Major general Johannes Zeuthen Schroll (1831–1916)	5 October 1887	26 November 1896	9 years, 52 days	
8		Major general Marius Hedemann (1836–1903)	27 November 1896	1901	4–5 years	
9		Major general Georg Zachariae (1835–1907)	1901	1903	1–2 years	
10		Major general Arnold Kühnel (1850–1908)	1903	4 November 1905	1–2 years	
11		Major general Vilhelm Gørtz (1852–1939)	5 November 1905	19 August 1909	3 years, 287 days	
12		Major general Anders Ludvig Hansen (1856–1920)	August 1909	1912	2–3 years	
13		Major general Palle Berthelsen (1857–1920)	1912	6 August 1917	4–5 years	
14		Major general Ellis Wolff (1856–1938)	August 1917	May 1918	8 months	
15		Major general Edgar Castonier (1866–1934)	5 May 1918	December 1919	1 year, 6 months	
16		Major general Louis Nielsen (1865–1936)	December 1919	November 1922	2 years, 11 months	
17		Major general Peter Lauritz Martin Birke (1865–1941)	23 November 1922	9 July 1930	7 years, 228 days	
18		Major general Johan Christian Lund (1871–1931)	July 1930	5 April 1931 #	8 months	
19		Major general William Wain Prior (1876–1946)	April 1931	31 October 1937	6 years, 6 months	
20		Major general Ebbe Gørtz (1886–1976)	1 November 1937	31 May 1941	3 years, 211 days	
21		Major general Hans Rolsted (1884–1966)	1 June 1941	1945	3–4 years	
22		Major general Erik C.V. Møller (1896–1972)	1945	30 September 1950	4–5 years	
