= German invasion of Denmark =

German invasion of Denmark may refer to:

- German invasion during the First Schleswig War (1848–1852)
- German invasion during the Second Schleswig War (1864)
- German invasion of Denmark (1940) during World War II
