= Generalmajor =

General officer rank in many militaries

Generalmajor is the Germanic variant of major general, used in a number of Central and Northern European countries.

== Denmark ==
Major general Generalmajor
- Rank flag

- Army and Air force insignia

- Vehicle Star Plate
- Country: Denmark
- Service branch: Royal Danish Army; Royal Danish Air Force
- Abbreviation: gen.m.
- Rank group: General officer (Chefniveau)
- Rank: Two-star
- NATO rank code: OF-7
- Pay grade: M404
- Formation: Before 1671
- Next higher rank: Generalløjtnant
- Next lower rank: Brigadegeneral
- Equivalent ranks: Kontreadmiral

Generalmajor is the second lowest general officer rank in the Royal Danish Army and Royal Danish Air Force. As a two-star rank it is the equivalent to the rank of counter admiral in the Royal Danish Navy.

The rank is rated OF-7 within NATO. It has the grade of M404 within the Ministry of Defence's pay structure. The rank of major general is reserved for the Chief of the army and air force.

=== History ===
On 25 May 1671, the ranks were codified, by King Christian V, with the publication of the Danish order of precedence. Here generals of the branch were placed below Lieutenant field marshal (Danish: Feltmarskal Lieutenant), and above the noble rank of Count and the military rank of Lieutenant general.

As part of the Army Reform of 1867, the ranks of Major, Lieutenant colonel were removed and only a single "General" rank was kept. After the 1880 reform, the general officer ranks were reintroduced. Commanding generals of the 1st and 2nd General Command were made Lieutenant generals while everyone else were made Major general.

=== Insignia ===
The first official uniform was instituted on 29 September 1737. The first few uniform designs have not survived, though they were likely red, highly ornamented coats without collar. The red coat remained until 1768, when Comte de Saint-Germain instituted white uniforms for generals, these were however removed shortly after, in 1769. In 1772, the first real ranks were introduced to the Danish Army; these were gold rings on the cuffs, with three for full generals, two for Lieutenant generals, and one for major generals. This uniform saw a number of changes until 1785, when the cuff ranks were removed.

In 1801, new uniforms were introduced for the whole army. Along with the new uniforms, epaulette ranks were introduced for officers, with generals wearing six-pointed stars on their epaulettes. The general ranks remained largely unchanged from their introduction until 1979, and the adoption of NATO STANAG 2116. The adoption created the new rank of Brigadier general, which would receive the one star, meaning the major general would receive two stars.

Rank insignia for General

Army uniform (1801–1822)

Full dress (1822–1869)
Field uniform (1822–1849)

Full dress (1869–1889)
Field uniform (1849–1889)

Full dress (1889–1989)

Field uniform (1910–1915)

... (1915–1923)

... (1923–1952)

... (1952–1963)

... (1963–1979)

Service shirt slip-on (1969–1979)

Field uniform (1979–2018)

Full dress (1989–present)

Service shirt slip-on (1989–present)

Field uniform (2018–present)

Air Force

Air Force sleeve

== Germany ==
Major general Generalmajor
- Army and Air Force insignia
- Country: Germany
- Service branch: German Army; German Air Force
- Abbreviation: GenMaj
- Rank: Two-star
- NATO rank code: OF-7
- Non-NATO rank: O-8
- Formation: 1956
- Next higher rank: Generalleutnant
- Next lower rank: Brigadegeneral
- Equivalent ranks: Konteradmiral

It is the third-highest general officer rank in the German Army (Heer) and German Air Force (Luftwaffe). This rank is also used in the Austrian Armed Forces, but is abbreviated as GenMjr.

Historically, German Army ranks for its generals prior to 1945 were offset by one from those of most other major European armies. Thus, prior to 1945, the Generalmajor rank in the German Army was equivalent to the brigadier general rank in other armies, and so forth.

=== Generalmajor in modern Germany ===
The rank is rated OF-7 in NATO, and is grade B7 in the pay rules of the Federal Ministry of Defence. It is equivalent to Konteradmiral in the German Navy (Marine) or to Generalstabsarzt, and Admiralstabsarzt in the Zentraler Sanitätsdienst der Bundeswehr.

On the shoulder straps (Heer, Luftwaffe) there are two golden pips (stars) in golden oak leaves.

Heer	Luftwaffe	... to service uniform
Generalmajor (field suit) Generalmajor (retired) General-stabsarzt (dental medicine)	Generalmajor (field suit) General-stabsarzt (human medicine)	Arabesque (right) Arabesque (left)

Bundeswehr sequence of ranks ascending

junior rank: Brigadegeneral	(German officer rank); Generalmajor	senior rank: Generalleutnant

=== Generalmajor in East Germany ===
Generalmajor was in the so-called "armed organs of the GDR" (German: Bewaffnete Organe der DDR), represented by Ministry of National Defence, and Ministry for State Security, the lowest general officer rank, comparable to the one-star rank in many NATO-Armed forces (Rangcode OF-6). This was in reference to Soviet military doctrine and in line with other armed forces of the Warsaw Pact.

The equivalent rank of the Volksmarine (GDR Navy) was the Konteradmiral, often called simply Herr Admiral for short.

Junior rank Oberst	National People's Army rank Generalmajor (Konteradmiral)	Senior rank Generalleutnant

Rank insignias Generalmajor / Konteradmiral (OF-6)
Stasi	Land forces	Air Force	GDR Border troops	Volksmarine
Generalmajor				Konteradmiral

=== German armies and air forces until 1945 ===
Historical ranks (ascending):

- Generalmajor
- Generalleutnant
- General der Waffengattung
- Generaloberst
- Generalfeldmarschall

==== Generalmajor of the Wehrmacht ====
Generalmajor was in the German Reich and Nazi Germany the lowest general officer rank, comparable to the one-star rank in many NATO-Armed forces (Rangcode OF-6). It was equivalent to Konteradmiral in the Kriegsmarine, and SS-Brigadeführer in the Waffen-SS until 1945.

Rank insignia Generalmajor / Konteradmiral

Branch	German Army	Luftwaffe	Waffen-SS	Kriegsmarine
Collar				None
Shoulder
Sleeve
Rank designation	Generalmajor		SS-Brigadeführer und Generalmajor der Waffen-SS	Konteradmiral

Sequence of ranks ascending

Junior rank: Oberst	(German officer rank); Generalmajor	Senior rank: Generalleutnant

== Sweden ==
Generalmajor is a military rank in Sweden that is equivalent to a two-star general. It is the third highest military rank, positioned above brigadgeneral (brigade general) and below generallöjtnant (general lieutenant).

== See also ==
- Comparative officer ranks of World War I
- Comparative officer ranks of World War II
- Ranks of the National People's Army
