= Abild =

Village and parish in Falkenberg Municipality, Sweden

Coordinates: 56.9388°N 12.7219°E

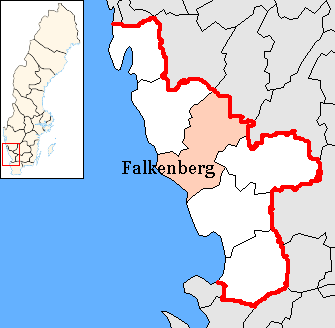
This village is within this municipality area (in red)

Abild (Swedish pronunciation: [ˈɑ̂ːbɪld]) is a village and parish in Falkenberg Municipality, Sweden. The parish is a part of Slöinge rectory. Abild is first mentioned in writing in 1431, it was then written Apulde. The origin of the name is probably the old Hallandic word for wild apples, apuld. Hjuleberg Mansion is located within the parish.

== Geography ==
Suseån, a small river, flows through the eastern parts of the parish. A lake, Mossjön, can be found in the central parts.

== History ==
No stone age graves has been found. Some other remains, such as flint axes have however been found. There are some finds from the Roman Iron Age and the migration period, the most spectacular being an 18 gram golden ring.

The oldest parts of the church was built in the 12th and 13th century. It is said to previously have had the name "Sankt Johannes kyrka" (Saint John's church) after John the Baptist. Most of the inventories are from the 17th century, during which the church was prolonged to the east. The church was painted in 1767. These paintings were later covered by new paintings, until they were restored in 1953. The church has been refurbished in 1927 and 1998.

Within the church tombs can be found, where members of the noble families Thott and Lilliehöök are buried.

== Infrastructure ==
County road 150 pass through the parish in an east-west direction. Some smaller roads pass through the parish as wells. These roads do to a large extent follow old trade route, given the name Via Regia.
