= Generalkommandoen =

Chief of the General Command
- Chefen for Generalkommandoen (Danish)
- Flag for the Chief of the General Command

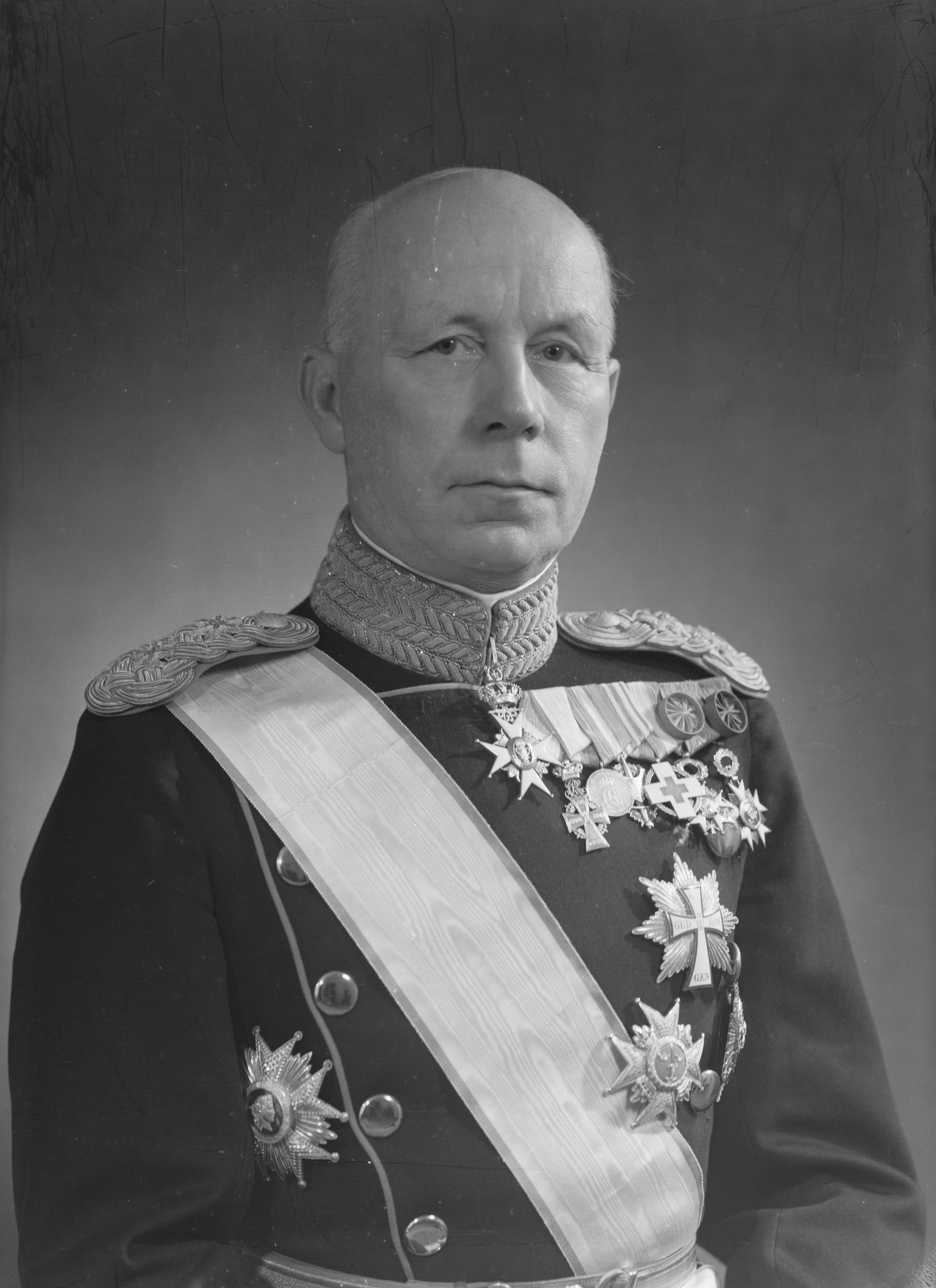
- Longest serving Ebbe Gørtz; 29 August 1941–30 September 1950
- Royal Danish Army
- Style: His Excellency
- Residence: Commander's House, Kastellet
- Precursor: 1st General Command; 2nd General Command
- Formation: 7 August 1922
- First holder: Ellis Wolff
- Final holder: Ebbe Gørtz
- Abolished: 30 September 1950
- Succession: Chief of the Army Command
- Deputy: Chief of the General Staff

The General Command (Danish: Generalkommandoen) was the highest command body in the Royal Danish Army. It was erected in 1922 Defence Agreement, adopted by Rigsdagen on 7 August 1922 and was a result of collecting 1st and 2nd General Command. It was terminated in 1950, following the Danish defense reform of 1950, which split it into Eastern and Western Regional Command.

== Role ==
The Chief of the General Command was responsible for the war preparations, but the execution was left to the General Staff, which until 1932 was an independent institution directly under the Ministry of War. The Chief of the General Staff, thus held an independent advisory position to the Ministry of War even though he was designated as the Chief of Staff to the Chief of the General Command. After the 1932 Defence Agreement, the General Staff was place under the General Command. This meant the Chief of the General Command had two subordinate staffs:

- The General Command Staff: command over the troops, exercises and education
- The General Staff: war preparation

Additionally, the Inspector Generals and the heads of the technical corps were also subjugated the Chief of the General Command.

== Chiefs of the General command ==
No.	Portrait	Name (born–died)	Term of office			Ref.
No.	Portrait	Name (born–died)	Took office	Left office	Time in office	Ref.
1		Lieutenant general Ellis Wolff (1856–1938)	1 April 1923	19 October 1926	3 years, 201 days	
2		Lieutenant general Anders Gjedde Nyholm (1861–1939)	20 October 1926	31 July 1931	4 years, 303 days	
3		Lieutenant general Erik With (1869–1959)	1 August 1931	1 December 1939	8 years, 122 days	
4		Lieutenant general William Wain Prior (1876–1946)	1 December 1939	28 August 1941	1 year, 270 days	
5		Lieutenant general Ebbe Gørtz (1886–1976)	29 August 1941	30 September 1950	9 years, 32 days	
