= Suseån =

Coordinates: 56°50′N 12°35′E

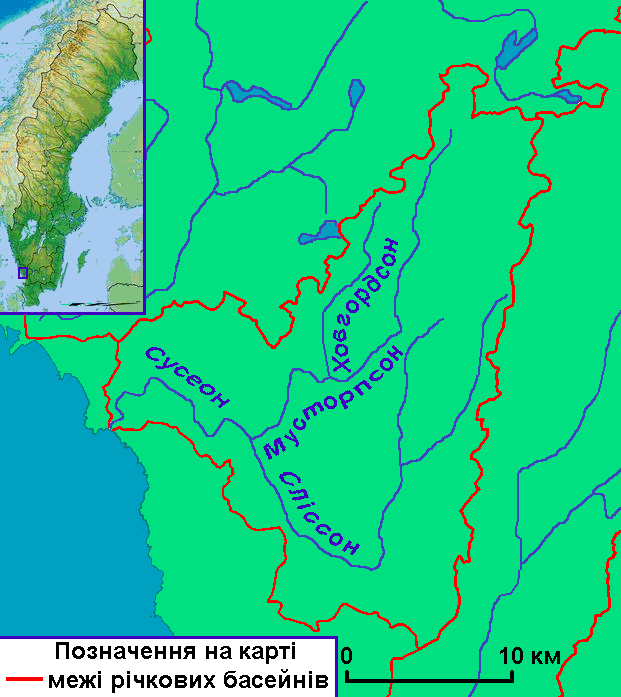

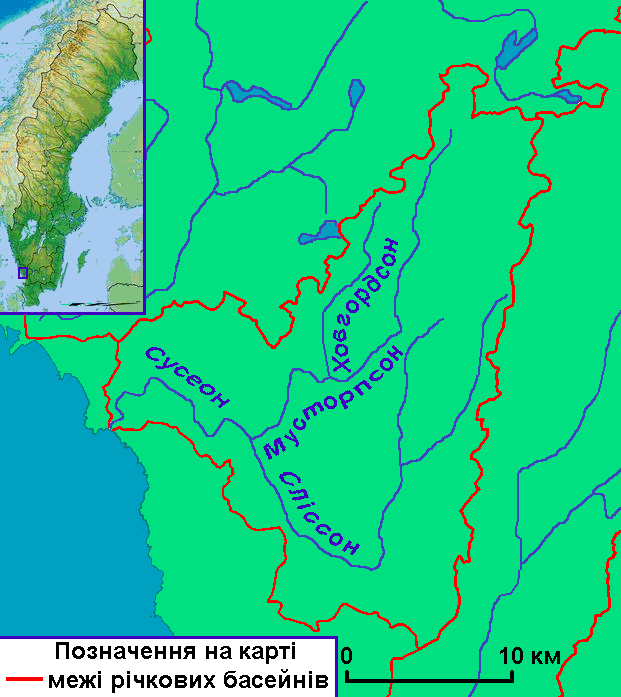
- Map of Suseån's drainage basin.

Location
- Country: Sweden
- County: Halland

Physical characteristics
- Mouth
  - elevation: 12 m
- Basin size: 200.0 km^{2} (77.2 sq mi)

Suseån is a river in Sweden.
