= Rebellion of Harald Bluetooth =

- Part of the Christianization of Scandinavia
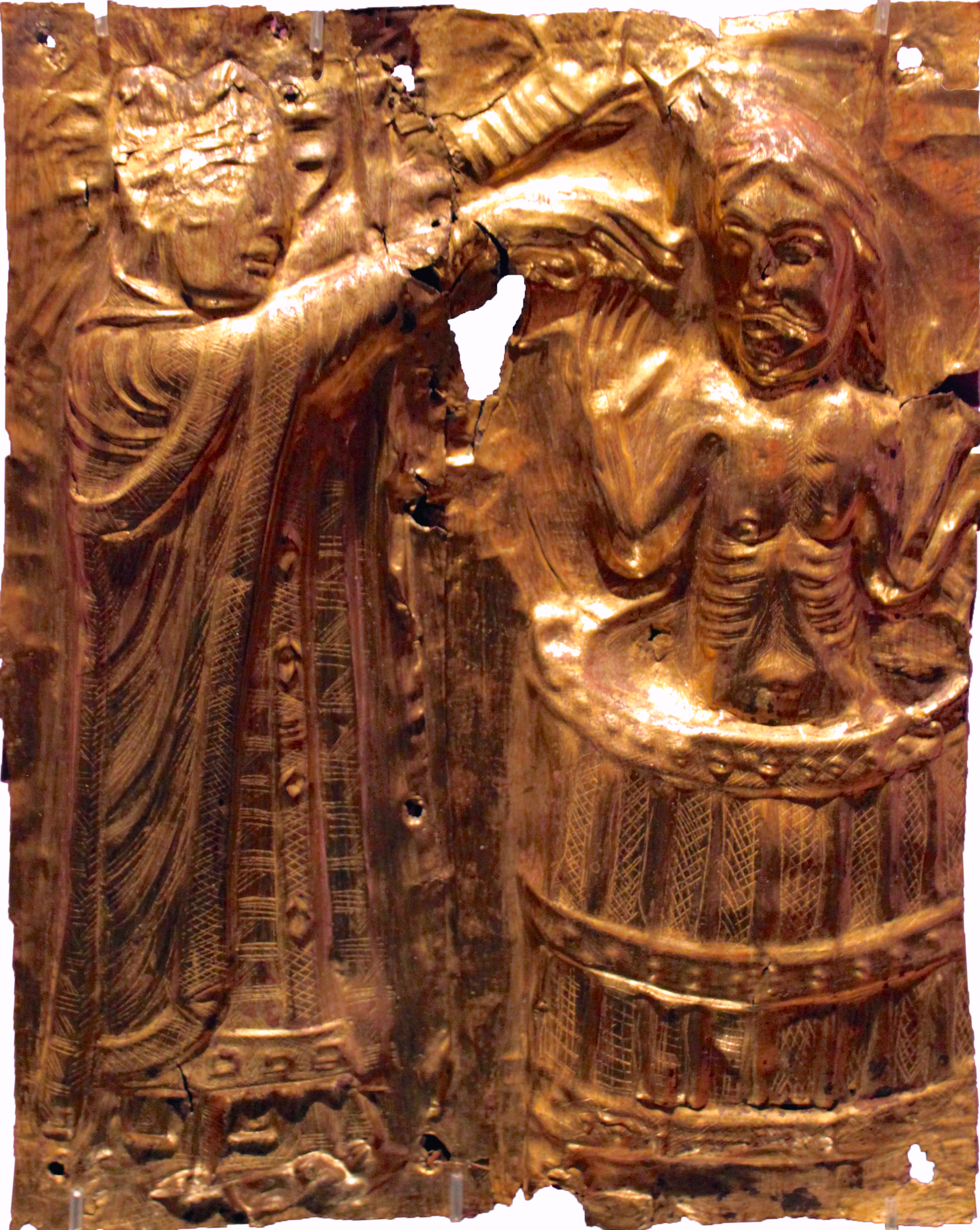
- Harald being baptized by Poppo the monk, in a relief dated to c. 1200
| Date | 974 |
| Location | Saxony and Southern Denmark |
| Result | German-allied victory |

Belligerents
| Denmark; Norway | Holy Roman Empire; Norwegian Rebels; Wendland; Saxons; Franks |

Commanders and leaders
| Harald Bluetooth; Haakon Sigurdsson | Otto II; Olaf Tryggvason |

Strength
| Unknown | Unknown |

Casualties and losses
| Unknown | Unknown |

The Rebellion of Harald Bluetooth was a conflict between Denmark and Norway, under the newly established House of Knýtlinga, and the Holy Roman Empire, under the Ottonian Dynasty.

The Ottonians, specifically under Otto the Great, sought to crush the rebellion of the Danish king, Harald Bluetooth, to secure Otto's position and ensure stability in preventing Viking raids.

== War ==
Following the death of Otto I in 973, his son Otto II ascended to the throne as Holy Roman Emperor. Harald, along with other Norwegian factions, formally rebelled against the new emperor. This rebellion resulted in an invasion of the Duchy of Saxony, the heartland of the Ottonian dynasty, by a Viking army.

In response, Emperor Otto II mobilized an army and led an expedition to Denmark. There, he encountered significant resistance. Otto II’s forces suffered a surprising defeat at the gates of Wiglesdor near the Danevirke, a Danish fortification, in 974. Following the defeat, the Norwegian forces withdrew, leaving the Danes to defend their territory. Seizing the opportunity to retaliate, Otto II launched another campaign against Harald's forces the following year. This time, the imperial military succeeded in overcoming the Danish defenses.

The Empire's victory culminated in the breaching of the Dannevirke, marking the first time imperial soldiers had crossed the wall. In the aftermath of the battle, Otto II captured significant portions of Jutland, weakening Harald's position and consolidating imperial control over the region.

== Aftermath ==
Defeated, Harald Bluetooth once again submitted to the Ottonians.

Earl Haakon had helped against the Germans with a Norwegian army, but shortly after the Danish defeat and Harald forcing him to convert to Christianity, he rebelled against Harald Bluetooth in 975 and made Norway an independent kingdom.
