= Eastern Regional Command (Denmark) =

- Østre Landsdelskommando
- Coat of arms for the Eastern Regional Command
- Active: 1839–1923; 1950–1990
- Disbanded: 1 January 1991
- Country: Denmark
- Branch: Royal Danish Army
- Part of: (NATO) AFNORTH
- Garrison/HQ: Copenhagen until 1978; Ringsted

The Eastern Regional Command (Danish: Østre Landsdelskommando) (known until 1923 as 1st General Command (Danish: 1. Generalkommando)) was the overall command of all Royal Danish Army units on Zealand. It was split into four military regions and was responsible for regional defence. In 1990, the Regional Commands were disbanded and control was collected at the newly created Army Operational Command.

== History ==
Following the introduction of absolute monarchy in 1660, the King held absolute power over the army. However, in cases of war, the King would appoint regional commanders. After the end of the English Wars, it was decided to keep the commands, even during peacetime. Originally named the General Command over Zealand, Lolland-Falster, Møn and Bornholm, it was one of five General Commands. (Note: The others being the General Command in Norway and in the Duchies (1772–1848), the General Command of Funen (1801–1855), the General Command for Langeland, Ærø and Tåsinge (1807–1814) & the General Command Northern Jutland (1801-1854)) However, after the Frederick VI came to power, he kept control of Zealand. It was only after the King's death in 1839, that control was given back to the military, with Hereditary Prince Ferdinand as the first chief. Around 1900, the commander of the 1st General Command was designated Army Commander-in-Chief in times of war. As such, during World War I, the commander took control of the security force (Danish: Sikringsstyrken). As part of the 1922 Defence Agreement, 1st and 2nd General Command were merged to create the unified General Command.

In 1950, as part of expansive rebuilding and reorganization of the army, the regional General Commands were revived as the Eastern and Western Regional Command. In the beginning, there was a large focus on having a larger defence in Jutland and the Western Regional Command. However, after the West German rearmament, the focus was shifted back towards Zealand. In case of war, the command would be placed under the control of the Allied Forces Northern Europe. Following the end of the Cold War, there was a political wish to reduce military spending along with greater centralization. This led to the Eastern Regional Command being disbanded in 1990 and control given to the newly created Army Operational Command.

== Structure ==
=== 1st General Command ===
Structure in 1870 was:

Zealand

- 1st Battalion in Copenhagen
- 2nd Battalion in Copenhagen
- 3rd Battalion in Helsingør
- 4th Battalion in Copenhagen
- 13th Battalion in Copenhagen
- 15th Battalion in Copenhagen
- 17th Battalion in Copenhagen
- 18th Battalion in Helsingør
- Life Guards in Copenhagen
- 21st Battalion in Copenhagen
- 22nd Reserve Battalion in Helsingør
- 23rd Reserve Battalion in Copenhagen
- 24th Reserve Battalion in Copenhagen
- Guard Hussar Regiment in Copenhagen
- 4th Dragoon Regiment in Næstved
- 1st Field Artillery Regiment in Copenhagen
- 2nd Field Artillery Regiment in Copenhagen

=== Eastern Regional Command ===
The structure in 1950–1990 was:

- 1st Zealand Brigade (added in 1960)
- 2nd Zealand Brigade (added in 1960)
- 3rd Zealand Brigade (added in 1960, disbanded in 1974)
- 1st Zealand battle group (added in 1982)
- 2nd Zealand battle group (added in 1982)
- 3rd Zealand battle group (added in 1982)
- 4th Zealand battle group (added in 1982)
- Military Region V, VI & VII
- Royal Life Guards in Copenhagen and Sandholm
- Danish Life Regiment in Høvelte
- Zealand Life Regiment in Slagelse
- Falster Regiment of Foot in Vordingborg (disbanded in 1976)
- Guard Hussar Regiment in Næstved
- Crown's Artillery Regiment in Sjælsmark
- Zealand Artillery Regiment in Holbæk (disbanded in 1982)
- Zealand Air Defence Regiment in Copenhagen (disbanded in 1970)
- Zealandic Engineer Regiment in Farum
- Zealandic Signal Regiment in Høvelte and Copenhagen
- Zealandic Logistic Regiment in Copenhagen
- Bornholm's Defence in Rønne

== Commanders ==
General Command of Zealand (1839–1855)

No.	Portrait	Name (Birth–Death)	Term of office			Ref.
No.	Portrait	Name (Birth–Death)	Took office	Left office	Time in office	Ref.
1		Hereditary Prince Ferdinand (1792–1863)	January 1840	October 1855	15 years, 9 months	

1st General Command (1855–1922)

No.	Portrait	Name (Birth–Death)	Term of office			Ref.
No.	Portrait	Name (Birth–Death)	Took office	Left office	Time in office	Ref.
1		Lieutenant general Frederik Bülow (1791–1858)	9 October 1855	6 November 1856	1 year, 28 days	
2		Hereditary Prince Ferdinand (1792–1863)	7 November 1856	29 June 1863 †	6 years, 234 days	
3		General; Christian de Meza (1792–1865)	4 September 1863	3 January 1864	121 days	
–		Lieutenant general Otto Schlegel (1794–1864); Acting	3 January 1864	6 March 1864	63 days	
(3)		General; Christian de Meza (1792–1865)	6 March 1864	31 March 1865	1 year, 25 days	
4		Lieutenant general Cai Hegermann-Lindencrone (1807–1893)	1 April 1865	6 November 1866	1 year, 219 days	
5		Lieutenant general Paul Scharffenberg (1810–1882)	7 November 1866	21 April 1879	14 years, 20 days	
6		Lieutenant general Julius Nielsen (1811–1891)	21 April 1879	1 April 1881	1 year, 345 days	
7		Lieutenant general Wilhelm Kauffmann (1821–1892)	5 April 1881	18 March 1891	9 years, 347 days	
8		Lieutenant general Carl Tvermoes (1830–1898)	25 March 1891	23 October 1894	3 years, 212 days	
9		Lieutenant general J.J. Bahnson (1827–1909)	23 October 1894	17 November 1897	3 years, 25 days	
10		Lieutenant general Johannes Zeuthen Schroll (1831–1916)	November 1897	1901	3–4 years	
11		Lieutenant general Marius Hedemann (1836–1903)	1901	1903	1–2 years	
12		Lieutenant general Georg Zachariae (1835–1907)	1903	November 1905	1–2 years	
13		Lieutenant general Arnold Kühnel (1850–1908)	5 November 1905	3 June 1908 †	2 years, 6 months	
14		Lieutenant general Christian Lütken (1840–1923)	June 1908	August 1909	1 year, 2 months	
15		Lieutenant general Vilhelm Gørtz (1852–1939)	19 August 1909	August 1917	7 years, 11 months	
16		Lieutenant general August Tuxen (1853–1929)	6 August 1917	5 May 1918	8 months	
17		Lieutenant general Ellis Wolff (1856–1938)	5 May 1918	31 March 1923	4 years, 10 months	

Eastern Regional Command (1950–1990)

No.	Portrait	Name (Birth–Death)	Term of office			Ref.
No.	Portrait	Name (Birth–Death)	Took office	Left office	Time in office	Ref.
1		Major general Valdemar Bjerregaard (1892–1964)	1 October 1950	30 April 1957	6 years, 211 days	
2		Major general Erik Kragh (1901–1984)	1 May 1957	30 November 1965	8 years, 213 days	
3		Major general Flemming Bussenius Larsen (1908–1996)	1 December 1965	30 November 1969	3 years, 364 days	
4		Major general Svend Børge Reimert Helsø (1910–1975)	1 December 1969	23 January 1975	5 years, 53 days	
5		Major general Jørgen Andreassen (1919–1999)	1 March 1975	31 August 1977	2 years, 183 days	
6		Major general Otto K. Lind (1920–2000)	1 September 1977	31 October 1980	3 years, 60 days	
7		Major general Niels-Aage Rye Andersen (1922–2002)	1 November 1980	30 September 1984	3 years, 334 days	
8		Major general Hieronymus Thomassøn Havning (1925–?)	1 October 1984	31 January 1990	5 years, 122 days	
9		Major general Jørgen Christian Essemann (1933–)	1 February 1990	31 December 1990	333 days	

== Names ==
Names
Generalkommandoen over Sjælland, Lolland-Falster, Møn og Bornholm	General Command over Zealand, Lolland-Falster, Møn and Bornholm	1807	–	1808
Generalkommandoen for Sjælland	General Command of Zealand	1839	–	1855
1. Generalkommando	1st General Command	1855	–	1923
Disbanded	Disbanded	1923	–	1950
Østre Landsdelskommando	Eastern Regional Command	1950-10-01	–	1991-01-01
