= OPROP! =

German propaganda leaflet

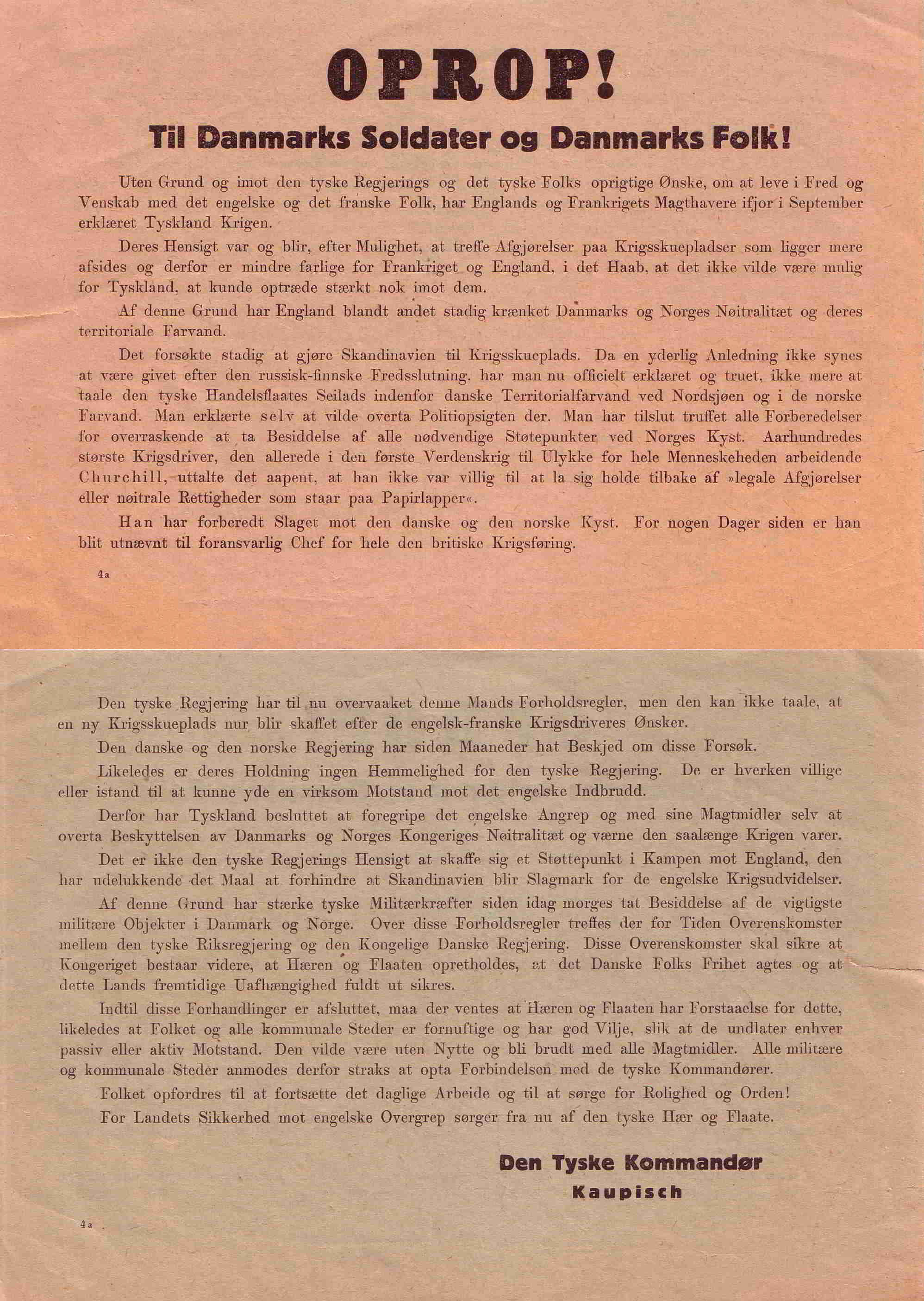
Leaflet dropped over Denmark during the German invasion 9 April 1940.

OPROP! (Opraab! in correct 1940-Danish; Opråb! in correct modern Danish; transl. proclamation, exclamation) was a German airborne propaganda leaflet dropped over several Danish cities at the German invasion of Denmark on 9 April 1940. The leaflets were signed by the head of Operation Weserübung Süd, General Leonhard Kaupisch. The text, written in broken but understandable Danish mixed with Norwegian, justified the German invasion as fraternally protecting Danish and Norwegian neutrality against British aggression, denounced Winston Churchill as a warmonger, and exhorted the Danish populace not to resist the German presence while an arrangement with the Danish government was being negotiated.

The OPROP! leaflet drop had a notable impact in regards to the Danish capitulation. When the German infantry arrived at the Amalienborg Palace in the morning of 9 April 1940, they were met with determined opposition from the King's Royal Guard, which repelled the initial attack, suffering three wounded. This gave Christian X and his ministers time to confer with the Danish Army chief General William Wain Prior. As the discussions were ongoing, several formations of Heinkel He 111 and Dornier 17 bombers flew over the city dropping the OPROP! leaflets. Faced with the explicit threat of the Luftwaffe bombing the civilian population of Copenhagen, and only General Prior in favour of continuing the fighting, the Danish government capitulated in exchange for retaining political independence in domestic matters.

In 2016, historian Hans Christian Bjerg argued that the poor broken Danish on the leaflet was because it was a rushed translation of a similar leaflet written by the Germans for use over Norway on the same day. The background reason was that Operation Weserübung initially called for invasion only of Norway and that the additional invasion of Denmark was decided at a late stage in the planning.
