= Lundtoftbjerg =

Lundtoftbjerg is an area 1 mile south of the small village Lundtoft in the southern part of Jutland, Denmark where the first fighting between Danish and German troops took place in 1940.

At 4:50 in the morning of April 9, 1940, a Danish platoon of 19 soldiers initiated the fighting against the Germans invading Denmark. With two 20mm cannon and a machine gun the Danes held back 18 advancing German panzers and almost 200 men for half an hour. Two armored cars and three armored motorcycles were destroyed and at least 4 Germans killed. One Dane was wounded and another killed in the following retreat.
