= William Wain Prior =

Danish general

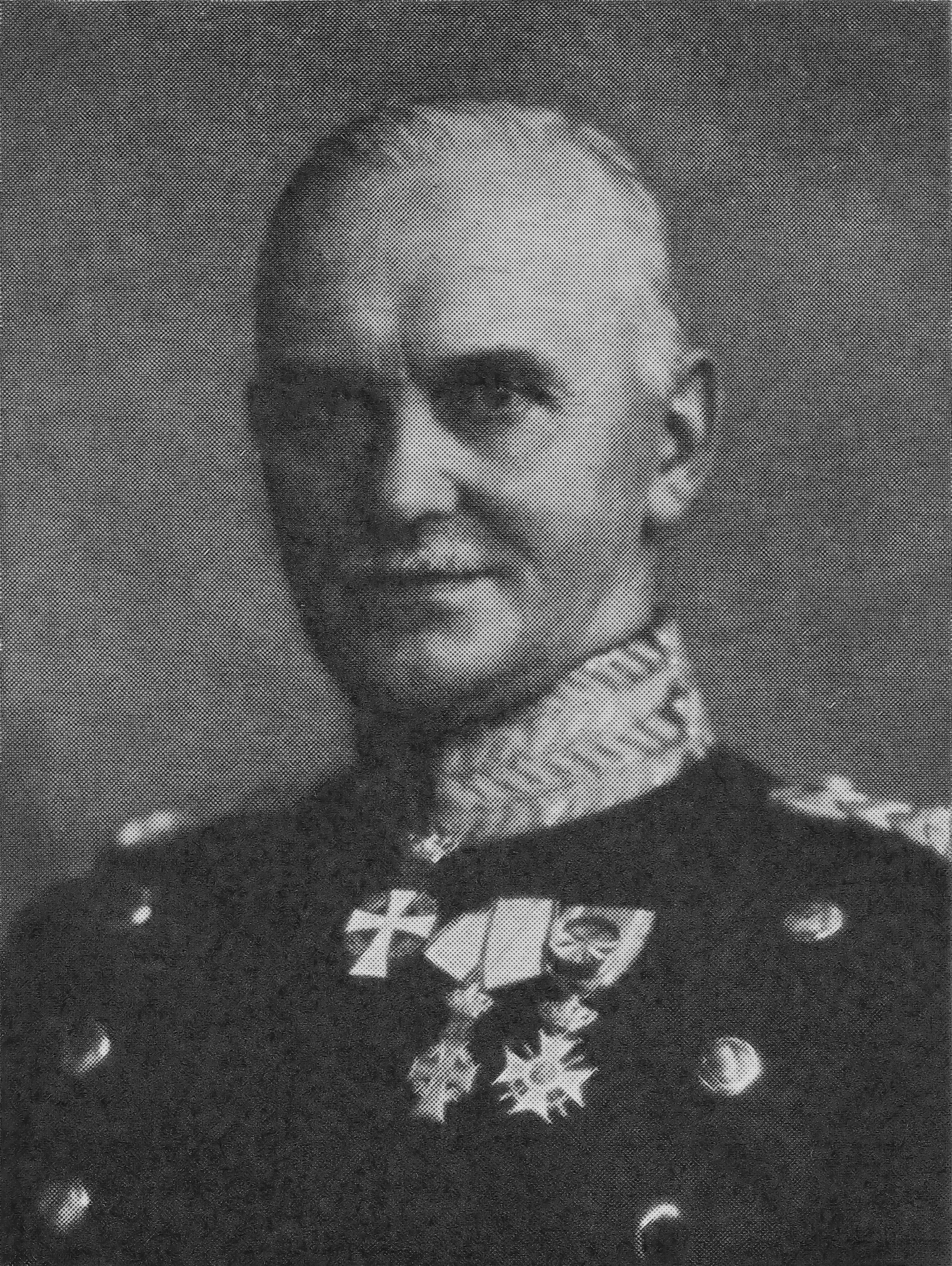

Chief of the General Command
- In office 1 December 1939 – 28 August 1941
- Preceded by: Erik With
- Succeeded by: Ebbe Gørtz

Chief of the General Staff
- In office April 1931 – 31 October 1937
- Preceded by: Johan Christian Lund
- Succeeded by: Ebbe Gørtz

Personal details
- Born: 18 July 1876 Copenhagen, Denmark
- Died: 9 March 1946 (aged 69) Frederiksberg, Denmark
- Resting place: Frederiksberg Old Cemetery
- Spouse: Jensine Ingeborg Hansen (m. 1901; died 1945)
- Children: 3
- Parent(s): Oskar Frederik Leopold Prior; Agnes Wain

Military service
- Allegiance: Denmark
- Branch/service: Royal Danish Army
- Years of service: 1894–1941
- Rank: Lieutenant general
- Commands: Zealand Division
- Battles/wars: World War II: German invasion of Denmark

William Wain Prior (18 July 1876 – 9 March 1946) was a Danish Lieutenant general and the Chief of the Royal Danish Army from 1939 to 1941.

== Life and career ==
Following the death of Johan Christian Lund, in 1931, Prior became chief of the General Staff.

On 1 December 1939, Prior replaced Erik With as chief of the General Command.

== World War II ==
Before the Occupation of Denmark by Germany in 1940, Prior encouraged the Danish government to increase the strength of the army. These requests, however, were not accepted by the majority of the Danish parliament, who feared that increased military strength might provoke Nazi Germany.

When Germany invaded Denmark in 1940, he argued that the Danish army should actively defend the country, even when Germany threatened through the dropping the OPROP! leaflets to bomb the capital of Copenhagen. However, the Danish government did not agree to this, due to concerns that major Danish cities like Copenhagen might suffer the same destruction that other cities like Warsaw had just experienced during the German invasion of Poland. The government was also well aware that Denmark's position was untenable; it was too small and too flat to hold out against the Wehrmacht for a sustained period.

Prior continued as Commander-in-Chief of the Danish Army during the early part of the German occupation, and worked actively to prevent the Danish army from becoming involved on the German side during World War II. He resigned as Commander-in-Chief in October 1941 and was replaced by Lieutenant General Ebbe Gørtz. On resignation Prior was awarded a Grand Cross of the Order of the Dannebrog, the highest class of the Order, signifying exceptional service to Denmark.

== Selected works ==
- Operationerne paa Østfronten i 1914. Studier over Verdenskrigen (in Danish). Copenhagen: Det Krigsvidenskabelige Selskab. 1919.
- Operationerne paa Østfronten i 1915. Studier over Verdenskrigen (in Danish). Copenhagen: Det Krigsvidenskabelige Selskab. 1921.
- Generalløjtnant A.A.B. Kühnel: En dansk officers liv og gerninger (in Danish). Copenhagen: Ejnar Munksgaard. 1942.

== Bibliography ==
- "DENMARK: Economy". Time. Time Magazine. 4 December 1939. Archived from the original on 3 June 2011.
- Bjerregaard, W. (24 June 1946). "Generalløjtnant W. W. Prior". krigsvidenskab.dk (in Danish).
- Clemmesen, Michael Hesselholt (1982). Jyllands landforsvar fra 1901 til 1940 (in Danish). Copenhagen: Det Krigsvidenskabelige Selskab. ISBN 87-981346-0-4.
- Grøn, Ole; Clemmesen, Michael H. (2014). "Skyggerne på væggen: Et forsøg på delvis rekonstruktion af efterretningstjenesten i og fra Sønderjylland fra 1920 til ca. 1950". Fra Krig og Fred (in Danish) (1): 86–180.
- Hedegaard, Ole A. (5 March 1996). "Generalløjtnant Prior og Generalkommandoens "varme" sommer 1941". krigsvidenskab.dk (in Danish).
- Olesen, Niels Wium (13 June 2013). "William Wain Prior, 1876-1946". danmarkshistorien.dk (in Danish).
- Olsen, Ole Isgaard (1985). Planlægning af det Sjællandske Landforsvar: 1922-1944 (in Danish). Forsvarskommandoen.
- Wolff, E. H. (18 July 2011). "W.W. Prior". Dansk Biografisk Leksikon (in Danish).
