= Zealand Air Defence Regiment =

- Sjællandske Luftværnsregiment
- Coat of arms
- Active: 1932−1970 (37 years)
- Country: Denmark
- Branch: Royal Danish Army
- Type: Anti-aircraft unit
- Role: Anti-aircraft warfare Counter-battery fire Indirect fire Target acquisition
- Size: Regiment
- Part of: Hærens Operative Kommando
- Garrison/HQ: Copenhagen
- Nickname: SLVR
- Motto: Suspicite Caelum (Look Up At the Sky)
- Colors: Crimson and blue
- March: Luftværnsregimentets Honnørmarch
- Mascot: Saint Barbara

Insignia
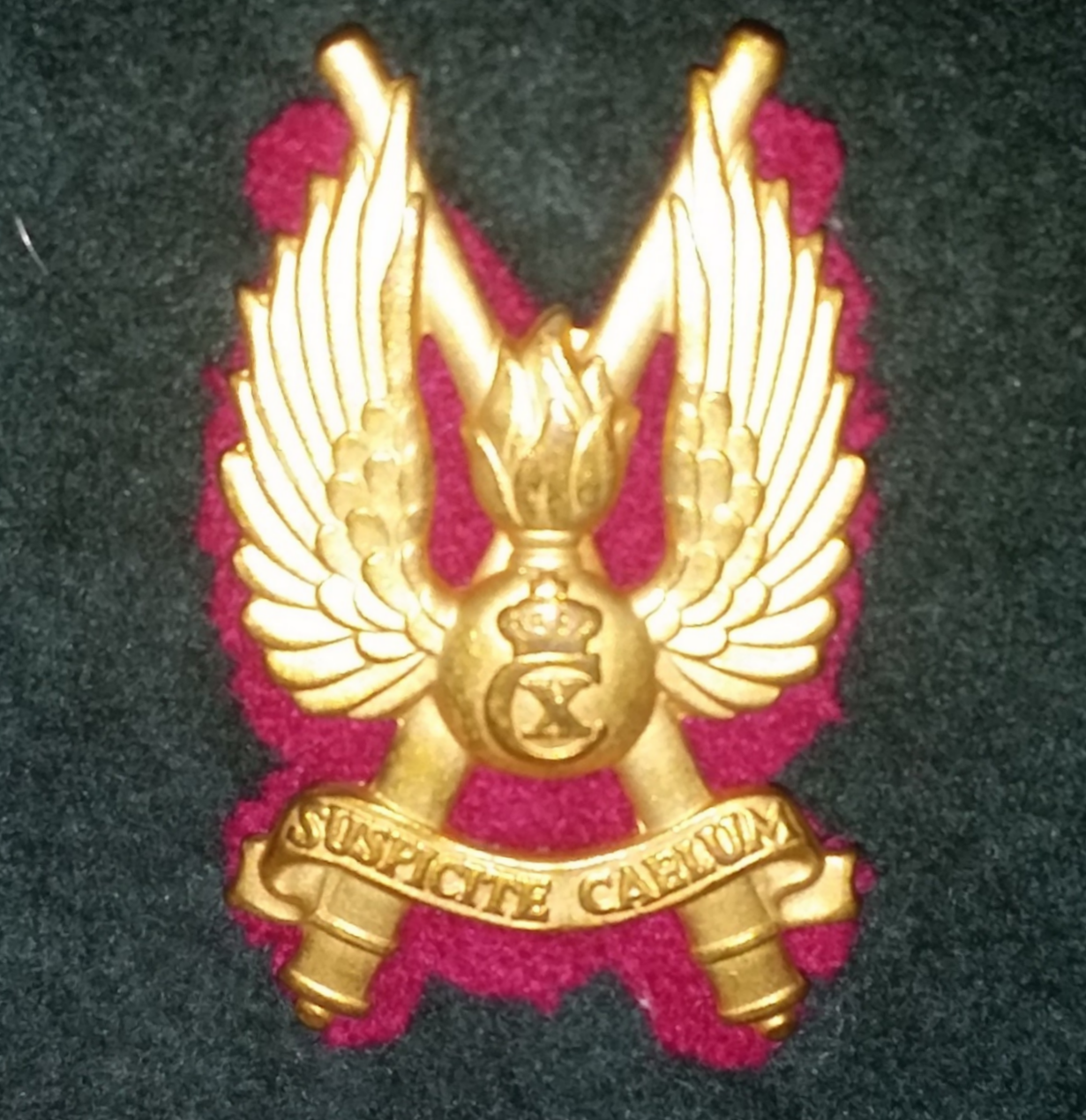
- Bagde

The Zealand Air Defence Regiment (Danish: Sjællandske Luftværnsregiment) was an army anti-aircraft regiment. On 1 September 1970 it was merged into Kronens Artilleriregiment.

== History ==
The regiment was established on 1 November 1932 as Luftværnsregimentet, however, the regiment traces its history even further back, as it is heir to the old Kystartilleriregimentet. The coast fortifications were transferred to the Navy and the coast artillery regiment was disbanded in 1932. Some of the personal was transferred to 10. Artilleriafdeling (AA) which was turned into an air defense unit. 10.AA was previously a reserved AA in 1. Feltartilleriregiment (Kronens Artilleriregiment). 10. AA formed the core of the new Luftværnsregimentet of 1937, along with 13. AA and 14. AA

On the 3rd of November 1951 14. AA was separeret from the regiment to created Jutlandic Air Defence Regiment.

On 2 July 1962 10th AA was Transferred to The Royal Danish Air Force

== Structure ==
- 1st Air Defence Battalion, (1951-1970)
- 10th Air Defence Battalion, (1937-1962) Transferred to The Royal Danish Air Force
- 13th Air Defence Battalion, (1937-1970)
- 14th Air Defence Battalion, (1937-1951) Transferred to Jutlandic Air Defence Regiment

== Names of the regiment ==
Names
Luftværnsregimentet	Air Defence Regiment	1932	–	1951
Sjællandske Luftværnsregiment	Zealand Air Defence Regiment	1951	–	1970

== External links and further reading ==
- https://dis-danmark.dk/bibliotek/903108.pdf
- Lærebog for Hærens Menige, Hærkommandoen, marts 1960
