= Danish Division =

Danish Division Multinational Division North
- Active: 1 January 1997 – present (29 years, 4 months)
- Country: Denmark
- Branch: Royal Danish Army
- Size: Division HQ
- Garrison/HQ: Haderslev Kaserne
- Patron: Knud Lavard
- Motto: Velox Et Acer (Quick And Sharp)
- Website: Official Facebook

Commanders
- Current commander: Major General Jette Albinus
- Notable commanders: R. Allerup

The Danish Division (Danish: Danske Division), short DDIV, is the only remaining military land division in Denmark. It was created on 1 January 1997 as the successor of Jutland Division. It is one of the now-three Divisions of Multinational Corps North East (MNC NE), the German-Danish-Polish Corps, the successor to the former German-Danish Allied Land Forces Schleswig-Holstein and Jutland (LANDJUT), a NATO Allied Forces Northern Europe formation.

Due to the Danish Defence agreement 2005–2009 Danish Division is currently undergoing major reorganisation, which will not only reduce the divisional strength but also transform it from the originally mobilization unit into a permanent and available formation. As a result of this, DDIV will possibly be affiliated with Allied Rapid Reaction Corps instead. The current structure consists of an armoured brigade, which is the main combat formation, and a training brigade, plus divisional troops. The armoured brigade consists of a single tank battalion, a reconnaissance battalion and two armoured infantry battalions.

== List of Structure by year ==
=== 2019–Dissolved: Became part of Multinational Division (North) along with framework partner nations, Latvia and Estonia ===
- Division Staff
  - Split HQ
    - Eastern HQ element, in Ādaži, Latvia.
    - Western HQ element, in Karup, Denmark
- Combat Support Battalion, Føringsstøtteregimentet in Ādaži

=== 2011–2018 ===
- Staff (Haderslev)
- 1.Brigade (Haderslev)
  - 1st Armoured Battalion, Jutland Dragoon Regiment (I/JDR Panserbataljon, Jydske Dragonregiment)
  - 2nd Armoured Infantry Battalion, Jutland Dragoon Regiment (II/JDR Panserinfanteribataljon, Jydske Dragonregiment)
  - 5th Training Battalion, Jutland Dragoon Regiment (V/JDR Uddannelsebatajlon, Jydske Dragonregiment)
  - 3rd Reconnaissance Battalion, Guard Hussar Regiment (III/GHR Opklaringsbataljon, Gardehusarregimentet)
- 2.Brigade (Slagelse)
  - 1st Armoured Infantry Battalion, Royal Life Guards (I/LG Panserinfanteribataljon, Den Kongelige Livgarde)
  - 2nd Armoured Infantry Battalion, Royal Life Guards (II/LG Panserinfanteribataljon, Den Kongelige Livgarde)
  - 1st Armoured Infantry Battalion, Guard Hussar Regiment (I/GHR Panserinfanteribataljon, Gardehusarregimentet)
  - 2nd Armoured Infantry Battalion, Guard Hussar Regiment (II/GHR Panserinfanteribataljon, Gardehusarregimentet)
  - 5th Training Battalion, Guard Hussar Regiment (V/GHR Uddannelsebatajlon, Gardehusarregimentet)

=== 2005–2011 ===
Danish Division (HQ Haderslev)

- 1.Brigade
  - Staff Company/1st Brigade, Signal Regiment (Stabskompagni/1. Brigade, Telegrafregimentet)
  - 1st Armoured Battalion, Jutland Dragoon Regiment (I/JDR Panserbataljon, Jydske Dragonregiment)
  - 1st Armoured Infantry Battalion, Royal Life Guards (I/LG Panserinfanteribataljon, Den Kongelige Livgarde)
  - 1st Armoured Infantry Battalion, Guard Hussar Regiment (I/GHR Panserinfanteribataljon, Gardehusarregimentet)
  - 3rd Reconnaissance Battalion, Guard Hussar Regiment (III/GHR Opklaringsbataljon, Gardehusarregimentet)
  - 1st Artillery Battalion, Danish Artillery Regiment (1 Artilleriafdeling, Danske Artilleriregiment)
  - 1st Armored Engineer Company, Engineer Regiment (1 Panseringeniørkompagni, Danske Artilleriregiment)
  - 1st Logistics Battalion, Logistics Regiment (1 Logistikbataljon, Trænregimentet)
  - 1st Military Police Company, Logistics Regiment (1 Militærpolitikompagni, Trænregimentet)
- 2.Brigade
  - 2nd Training Battalion, Signal Regiment (II. Uddannelsbataljon, Telegrafregimentet)
  - 2nd Training Battalion, Jutland Dragoon Regiment (II/JDR Uddannelsebatajlon, Jydske Dragonregiment)
  - 2nd Training Battalion, Royal Life Guards (II/LG Uddannelsebatajlon, Den Kongelige Livgarde)
  - 2nd Training Battalion, Guard Hussar Regiment (II/GHR Uddannelsebatajlon, Gardehusarregimentet)
  - 4th Training Battalion, Guard Hussar Regiment (IV/GHR Uddannelsebatajlon, Gardehusarregimentet)
  - 2nd Training Battalion, Danish Artillery Regiment (2 Uddannelseafdeling, Danske Artilleriregiment)
  - 2nd Training Battalion, Engineer Regiment (2 Uddannelsbataljon, Ingeniørregimentet)
  - 2nd Training Battalion, Logistics Regiment (2 Uddannelsbataljon, Trænregimentet)
  - 2nd Military Police Company, Logistics Regiment (2 Militærpolitikompagni, Trænregimentet)
- Divisional Troops
  - Command & Target Acquisition battalion, Danish Artillery Regiment (3 Førings- og Målopklaringsafdeling, Danske Artilleriregiment)
  - Missile Air Defence battalion, Danish Artillery Regiment (Luftværsmissilafdeling, Danske Artilleriregiment)(disbanded and merged into Command & Target Acquisition battalion in 2010, rest of Battalion transferred to Royal Danish Air Force)
  - 3rd Engineer Battalion, Engineer Regiment (3 Ingeniørbataljon, Ingeniørregimentet)
  - 3rd Signal Battalion, Signal Regiment (3 Telegrafbataljon, Telegrafregimentet)
  - 3rd Electronic Warfare Company, Signal Regiment (2 Electronic Warfare kompagni)
  - CIMIC Company, Danish Artillery Regiment (CIMIC kompagni, Danske Artilleriregiment )
  - 3rd Military Police Company, Logistics Regiment (3 Militærpolitikompagni, Trænregimentet)

=== 2000–2005 ===
Danish Division (HQ Fredericia)

- 3rd Signal Battalion (support and run Division HQ)
- 1st Jyske Brigade (HQ Fredericia)
  - 1st Staff Company/TGR,
  - I/PLR Mechanised Infantry Battalion
  - II/PLR MechInfantry Battalion
  - I/JDR Armoured Battalion
  - 1st Reconnaissance Squadron/JDR
  - 3rd Artillery Battalion/DAR (Armoured/Selfpropelled)
  - 1st Armoured Engineer Company
  - 7th Logistic Battalion
  - 1st MP detachment
- 3rd Jyske Brigade (HQ Haderslev)
  - 3rd Staff Company/TGR
  - III/PLR MechInfantry Battalion
  - IV/GHR MechInfantry Battalion
  - V/GHR Armoured Battalion
  - 3rd Reconnaissance Squadron/JDR
  - 7th Artillery Battalion/DAR (Armoured/Selfpropelled)
  - 3rd Armoured Engineer Company
  - 1st Logistic Battalion
  - 3rd MP detachment
- 1st Seeland Brigade (HQ Slagelse)
  - 4th Staff Company/GHR
  - I/LG MechInfantry Battalion
  - III/LG MechInfantry Battalion
  - I/GHR Armoured Battalion
  - 4th Reconnaissance Squadron/GHR
  - 1st Artillery Battalion/KAR (Armoured/Selfpropelled)
  - 4th Armoured Engineer Company
  - 2nd Logistic Battalion
  - 4th MP detachment
- Rear Combatgroup (HQ Skive)
  - 2nd Staff Company/PLR
  - V/PLR MechInfantry Battalion
  - VI/PLR Infantry Battalion
  - 2nd Reconnaissance Squadron/JDR
  - ? Logistic Battalion
  - 2nd MP detachment
- Divisional Troops
  - II/JDR Armoured Battalion
  - V/JDR Reconnaissance Battalion (Armoured)
  - Anti-tank Helicopter Company
  - Patrol Company/PLR (Long Range/Light Reconnaissance)
  - Division Artillery (HQ Sjælsmark)
    - Staff&Target-Acquisition Battery/KAR
    - 2nd Artillery Battalions/KAR (towed)
    - 23rd Artillery Battalions/DAR (towed)
    - 24th Artillery Battalions/DAR (towed)
    - 18th Rocket-launch Battery/KAR (Armoured/Selfpropelled)
  - 14th Anti-aircraft rocket Battalion/DAR
  - 3rd Engineering Battalion
  - 3rd Electronic Warfare Company
  - 3rd Logistic Support Battalion
  - Transport Company (Heavy transport)
  - 3rd Military Police Company

=== 1997–2000 ===
Danish Division (HQ Fredericia)

- 3rd Signal Battalion (support and run Division HQ)
- 1st Jyske Brigade (HQ Fredericia)
  - 1st Staff Company/TGR,
  - I/DRLR MechInfantry Battalion
  - I/SLFR MechInfantry Battalion
  - III/JDR Armoured Battalion
  - 1st Reconnaissance Squadron/JDR
  - 3rd Artillery Battalion/NJAR (Armoured/Selfpropelled)
  - 1st Armoured Engineer Company
  - 7th Logistic Battalion
  - 1st MP detachment
- 3rd Jyske Brigade (HQ Haderslev)
  - 3rd Staff Company/SLFR
  - I/PLR MechInfantry Battalion
  - II/PLR MechInfantry Battalion
  - I/JDR Armoured Battalion
  - 3rd Reconnaissance Squadron/JDR
  - 7th Artillery Battalion/SJAR (Armoured/Selfpropelled)
  - 3rd Armoured Engineer Company
  - 1st Logistic Battalion
  - 3rd MP detachment
- 1st Sjællandske Brigade (HQ Ringsted)
  - 4th Staff Company/SJLR
  - II/DLR MechInfantry Battalion
  - IV/GHR MechInfantry Battalion
  - I/GHR Armoured Battalion
  - 4th Reconnaissance Squadron/GHR
  - 1st Artillery Battalion/KAR (Armoured/Selfpropelled)
  - 4th Armoured Engineer Company
  - 2nd Logistic Battalion
  - 4th MP detachment
- Divisional Troops
  - II/JDR Armoured Battalion
  - V/JDR Reconnaissance Battalion (Armoured)
  - Anti-tank Helicopter Company
  - Patrol Company/DRLR (Long Range/Light Reconnaissance)
  - Division Artillery (HQ Skive)
    - Staff&Target-Acquisition Battery/NJAR
    - 23rd Artillery Battalions/NJAR (towed)
    - 24th Artillery Battalions/SJAR (towed)
    - 18th Rocket-launch Battery/NJAR (Armoured/Selfpropelled)
  - 14th Anti-aircraft rocket Battalion/SJAR
  - 3rd Engineering Battalion
  - 3rd Electronic Warfare Company
  - 3rd Logistic Support Battalion
  - Transport Company (Heavy transport)
  - 3rd Military Police Company

== Equipment from 1997–2005 ==
As a MechInfantry Division, Danish Division contained

Name	Image	Origin	Type	Quantity	Notes
Armour
Leopard 1A5DK1		Germany	Main Battle Tank	198 (208)	50 in each of the three brigades; 10 in the first mechinfantry battalion; 10 in the second mechinfantry battalion; 30 in the armoured battalion; 30 in the divisions independent armoured battalion; 18 in the divisions recce battalion; (10 in Rear Combatgroup)
M113		United States	Armored Personnel Carrier	492	APCs and variants incl: 71 Command-vehicles; 20 in each of the three brigades; 5 in the HQ COY/Brigade; 4 in the armoured battalion; 5 in the first mechinfantry battalion; 5 in the second mechinfantry battalion; 1 in the Artillery battalion (CO battalion); 4 in the independent armoured battalion; 7 in recce battalion; 47 Maintain(fitter)-vehicles (13 (incl crane) Battalion level, 34 Company level); 13 in each of the three brigades (9+30); 5 in the armoured battalion (1+4); 4 in the first mechinfantry battalion (1+3); 4 in the second mechinfantry battalion (1+3); 5 in the independent armoured battalion(1+4); 3 in recce battalion (3+0); 153 Infantry-vehicles (long version); 45 in each of the three brigades; 9 in the armoured battalion; 18 in the first mechinfantry battalion; 18 in the second mechinfantry battalion; 9 in the independent armoured battalion; 9 in recce battalion; 41 Mortar-vehicles; 32 25mm machinegun-vehicles; 42 Medic-vehicles; 40 TOW-vehicles; 30 Artillery observer-vehicles; 18 Artillery fire control-vehicles; 18 Engineerins-vehicles (long version)
Recovery vehicles
Leopard 1 Berger		Germany	Armoured Recovery Vehicle	11	3 in each of the three brigades; 1 in the armoured battalion; 1 in the first mechinfantry battalion; 1 in the second mechinfantry battalion; 1 in the independent armoured battalion; 1 in recce battalion
8x8 IVECO EUROTRAKKER		Italy	Armoured Recovery Vehicle	24	6 in each of the three brigades; all 6 in the logistik battalion; 6 in the independent division logistik battalion
M578 Light Recovery Vehicle		United States	Armoured Recovery Vehicle	17	5 in each of the three brigades; 1 in the armoured battalion; 1 in the first mechinfantry battalion; 1 in the second mechinfantry battalion; 1 in the Artillery battalion; 1 in the Logistik battalion; 1 in the independent armoured battalion; 1 in the independent division logistik battalion
Leopard 1 Biber		Germany	Armoured Vehicle-launched Bridge	8	2 in each of the three brigades; 2 in the armoured engineer company; 2 in the independent division engineer battalion
Support
M114/39 towed		United States	Howitzer	54	Division level
M109 A2DK		United States	Self-propelled artillery	54	Brigade Level
M270 MLRS		United States	Multiple rocket launcher	8	Division level
TOW anti-tank system		United States	Anti-tank missile	88	40 systems on M113; 48 systems on wheeled-vehicles
Stinger Anti-aircraft launch system		United States	surface-to-air missile	48	48 Launch systems
60mm Light-mortar		United States	Mortar	66	Platoon level
81mm Medium-mortar		United StatesCanada	Mortar	57	41 in M113(Armoured/Selfpropelled)(Company level)
120mm Heavy-mortar		United States	Mortar	40	all towed (Battalion level)
Fennec AS550		France	Light multipurpose helicopter	12	With TOW anti-tank system
Vehicles (Combat groups)
GD240		Germany	SUV	180	Reconnaissance-Groups
MAN8		Germany	tactical trucks	107	Infantry-Groups
Unimog		Germany	tactical trucks	48	Stinger-Groups
MAGIRUS 168		Germany	tactical trucks	36	(Engineering-Groups)
HMMWV		United States	Light Armored Car	48	(TOW-Groups)

- Trucks and Vehicles (numbers unknown)
  - MAN trucks in different size and types (Staff, Logistik, Signals, Heavy transport, etc.)
  - GD240/290 in different types (CO's, XO's, Artillery Observer, Maintain, Liassion, Signals, MP's etc.)
  - MAGIRUS trucks in different size and types (Command post, Supply, Signals, Artillery, etc.)
  - VW Transporter in different types (Liassion, Supply, Maintain, etc.)
  - BMV motorcykel (Ordonace and MP's)
