= Danish International Brigade =

- Danish: Den Danske Internationale Brigade
- Armpatch and logo
- Active: 1994-2005
- Disbanded: 2005
- Country: Denmark
- Branch: Royal Danish Army
- Nickname(s): DIB

The Danish International Brigade (Danish: Den Danske Internationale Brigade), short DIB (also sometimes known as the Danish Reaction Brigade) was a Danish military brigade.

The political decision to form this brigade was conceived in the Danish Defence agreement 1992–1995. The formal decision to form the Brigade was made by the Folketing on 25 November 1993 and this date is often regarded as the birth of the Brigade. The Brigade was then formed, with staff and all subunits from the dispand 2.Zealand Brigade (2.SBDE) on 1 July 1994.

The background for its existence was changes in NATO's structure, in the European security situation and as a direct response to Denmark's involvement in UNPROFOR.

The purpose and design of the Brigade was to, in part or as a whole, to rapidly deploy in peacemaking, peacekeeping, humanity or similar missions under NATO, UN, OSCE or national supervision. In its lifespan the Brigade was never deployed as a whole but all subordinated units was deployed more than once.

On 1 January 1996, the Brigade was also assigned to the NATO Allied Command Europe Rapid Reaction Corps and fell under the organisational control of 1 (UK) Armoured Division when required. The DIB headquarters was located at Vordingborg barracks and made regularly exercises with 1 (UK) Armoured Division.

The DIB consisted of 4,800 personal, including a combat group of around 2,500 personnel in three battalions; a battalion equipped with Leopard 2A5 DK main battle tanks and an artillery unit with 18 self-propelled 155mm M-109 A3 howitzer, as well as logistics.

In all the Brigade had 51 Leopard 2A5 DK (Original 50 Leopard 1A5), 180 M113 (M113A1 with Add-On-Armour, M113A2 DK I (PNMK M/92) and M113 G3 DK) and 22 Mowag Piranha armored personnel carrier in various configurations and another ca. 1200 vehicles.

80% of the brigade consisted of volunteers who agreed to participate in up to two possible six-month international deployments during their four-year reserve commitment (originally this was only three years).

In the Danish Defence agreement 2005–2009, the brigade was to be dissolved and the Brigade thereby official ceased to exist on February 15, 2005. The Brigade-Staff was merged with the Staff of 1.Zealand Brigade (1.SBDE) (also terminated), to form the Staff in the newly erected 2. Brigade.

== Commanders ==
- 1994-1996, Brigadier General Finn Særmark-Thomasen
- 1997-2000, Brigadier General Jørgen Hansen-Nord
- 2000–2003, Brigadier General Jens Erik Frandsen
- 2003–2005, Brigadier General Agner Rokos

== Origination ==
1994–2001

- Staff / DIB
- 5 HQ Company (Danish Life Regiment)
- I/DLR Armoured Infantry battalion (Danish Life Regiment)
- I/SJLR Armoured Infantry battalion (Zealand Life Regiment)
- II/SJLR Armoured battalion (Zealand Life Regiment)
- 5th Recon company (Guard Hussar Regiment)
- Air defence battery (King's Artillery Regiment)
- 5th Artillery battalion (King's Artillery Regiment)
- 5th Armoured Engineer company (Engineer Regiment)
- 4th Logistic battalion (Logistic Regiment)
- 9th Logistic battalion (Logistic Regiment)
- 5th Military police Detachment (Logistic Regiment)

2000–2005

- Staff / DIB
- 5 HQ Company (Danish International Logistical Center)
- II/GHR Armoured Infantry battalion (Guard Hussar Regiment)
- IV/PLR Armoured Infantry battalion (Prince's Life Regiment)
- III/JDR Armoured battalion (Jutland Dragoon Regiment)
- 5th Recon company (Jutland Dragoon Regiment)
- Air defence battery (Queen's Artillery Regiment)
- 5th Artillery battalion (King's Artillery Regiment)
- 5th Armoured Engineer company (Engineer Regiment)
- 4th Logistic battalion (Danish International Logistical Center)
- 9th Logistic battalion (Danish International Logistical Center)
- 5th Military police Detachment (Logistic Regiment)

== Equipment from 1994–2005 ==
As a MechInfantry Brigade, Danish International Brigade contained

Name	Image	Origin	Type	Quantity	Notes
Armour
Leopard 1A5DK1		Germany	Main Battle Tank	50 (51)	30 (31) in the armoured battalion; 10 in the first mechinfantry battalion; 10 in the second mechinfantry battalion
Pansret Mandskabsvogn - PMV (M113)		United States	Armored Personnel Carrier	155	APCs and variants incl: 20 Command-vehicles; 5 in the HQ COY/Brigade; 4 in the armoured battalion; 5 in the first mechinfantry battalion; 5 in the second mechinfantry battalion; 1 in the Artillery battalion (CO battalion); 13 Maintain(fitter)-vehicles (3 (incl crane) Battalion level, 10 Company level); 5 in the armoured battalion (1+4); 4 in the first mechinfantry battalion (1+3); 4 in the second mechinfantry battalion (1+3); 45 Infantry-vehicles; 9 in the armoured battalion; 18 in the first mechinfantry battalion; 18 in the second mechinfantry battalion; 10 Mortar-vehicles; 16 25mm machinegun-vehicles; 16 Medic-vehicles; 20 TOW-vehicles; 10 Artillery observer-vehicles; 6 Artillery fire control-vehicles; 9 Engineerins-vehicles
Pansret Mandskabsvogn - PMV (Piranha III-H)		Switzerland	Armored Personnel Carrier	22	APCs and variants incl: 2 Command-vehicles; 2 Maintain(fitter)-vehicles; 18 Armored Personnel Carrier
Recovery vehicles
Leopard 1 Berger		Germany	Armoured Recovery Vehicle	3	1 in the armoured battalion; 1 in the first mechinfantry battalion; 1 in the second mechinfantry battalion
8x8 IVECO EUROTRAKKER		Italy	Recovery Vehicle	6	6 in the logistik battalion
M578 Light Recovery Vehicle		United States	Armoured Recovery Vehicle	5	1 in the armoured battalion; 1 in the first mechinfantry battalion; 1 in the second mechinfantry battalion; 1 in the Artillery battalion; 1 in the Logistik battalion
Pansret Broslagningsvogn Leopard 1 Biber		Germany	Armoured Vehicle-launched Bridge	2	2 in the armoured engineer company
Support
Selvkørende Haubits - SKH (M109 A2DK)		United States	Self-propelled artillery	18	Brigade Level
TOW anti-tank system		United States	Anti-tank missile	28	20 systems on M113; 8 systems on wheeled-vehicles
Stinger Anti-aircraft launch system		United States	surface-to-air missile	12	
60mm Light-mortar		United States	Mortar	21	Platoon level
81mm Medium-mortar		United StatesCanada	Mortar	16	10 in M113(Armoured/Selfpropelled); Company level
120mm Heavy-mortar		United States	Mortar	12	all towed Battalion level
Vehicles (Combat groups)
GD240		Germany	SUV	30	Reconnaissance-Groups
Unimog		Germany	tactical trucks	12	Stinger-Groups
HMMWV		United States	Light Armored Car	8	(TOW-Groups)

- Trucks and Vehicles (numbers unknown)
  - MAN trucks in different size and types (Staff, Logistik, Signals, Heavy transport, etc.)
  - GD240/290 in different types (CO's, XO's, Artillery Observer, Maintain, Liassion, Signals, MP's etc.)
  - MAGIRUS trucks in different size and types (Command post, Supply, Signals, Artillery, etc.)
  - VW Transporter in different types (Liassion, Supply, Maintain, etc.)
  - BMV motorcykel (Ordonace and MP's)
