= Royal Life Guards Music Band (Denmark) =

- Den Kongelige Livgardes Musikkorps
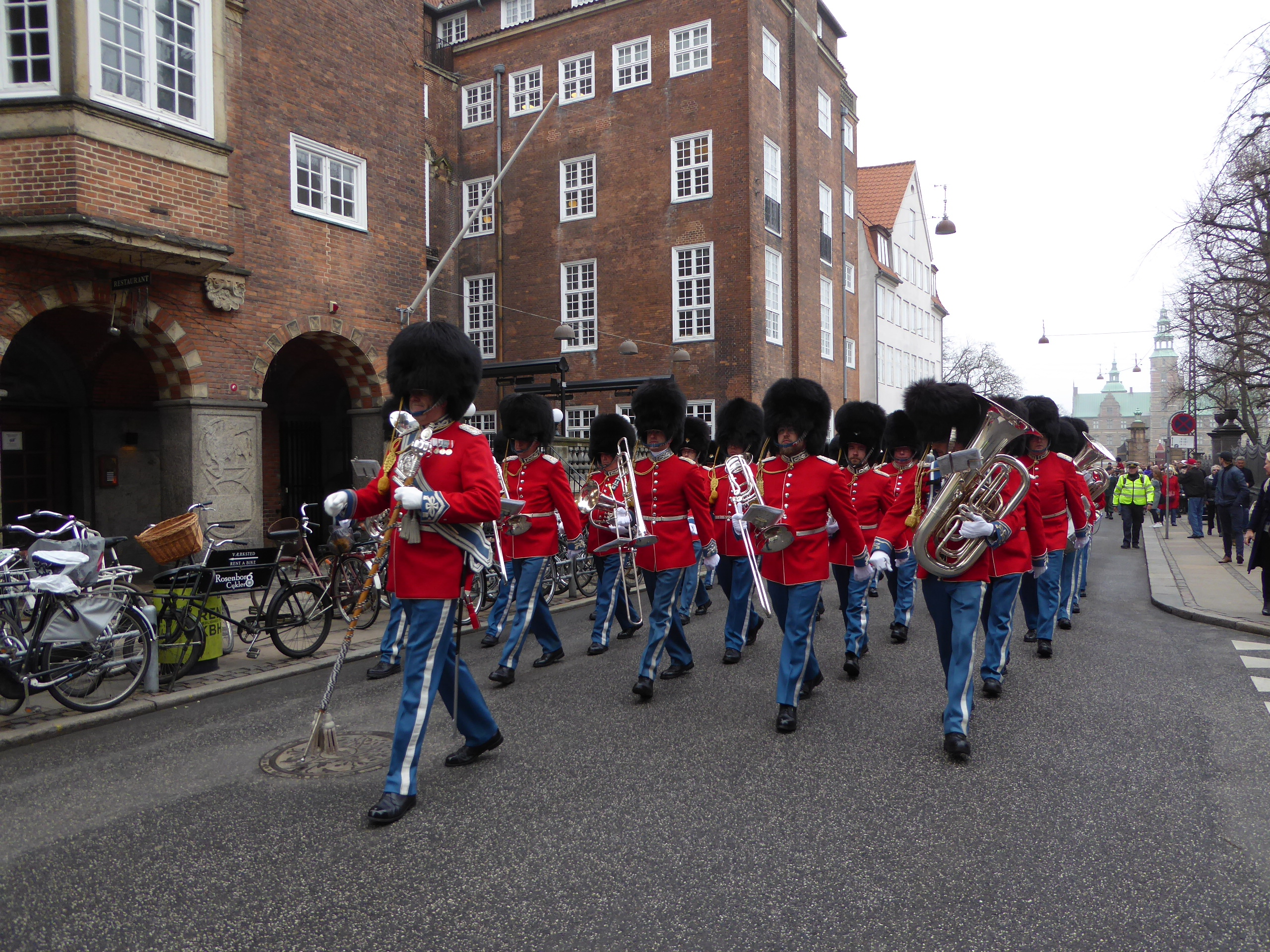
- The band parading on Rosenborggade.
- Active: June 30, 1658 (366 years ago) to present
- Country: Denmark
- Branch: Royal Danish Army
- Type: Military band
- Part of: Royal Life Guards (Denmark)
- Garrison/HQ: Rosenborg Castle, Copenhagen
- Nickname(s): The Guards Band
- Motto(s): Pro Rege et Grege (For King and people)
- Accronym: DKLM

Commanders
- Director of Music/Commanding Officer: David Palmquist
- Drum Major: Søren Rønløv Nielsen
- Notable commanders: Heinrich Gerlach; Peter Harbeck

Insignia
- Identification symbol

The Royal Life Guards Music Band (Danish: Den Kongelige Livgarde Musikkorps, DKLM) is the foremost military band in the Danish Defence and the official regimental band of the Danish Royal Life Guards. The DKLM is based in Copenhagen and primarily participates in parades and ceremonies for the Danish monarch (currently King Frederik X) and the Danish royal family. It also supports the government and the military, specifically increasing the esprit de corps in army units as well as in the public.

== Timeline ==
- 1658 – Royal Life Guards is established by Frederick III with a musical unit which consisted of fifes and drums.
- 1670–1699 – Under Christian V, 6 scale blowers are employed at Livgarden, and the first melodious instrument took its place in the Danish military music.
- Early 1700s – The Royal government hires a number of Oboist were hired, which composed the bulk of the band. Other instruments included trumpets, bassoons and horns. By the end of the century, Turkish Janissary musicians were also incorporated into the band.
- 1867 – The Music Band consists of 1 staff horn blower and 28 musicians.
- 1922 – The DKLM is expanded to 36 musicians, which is its current size at present.
- 1932 – 10 years later, the DKLM is left as the only military band in the country due to budget cuts.
- 1974 – The DKLM begins the process of expanding its activities by conducting large indoor/public concerts.

== Modern era ==
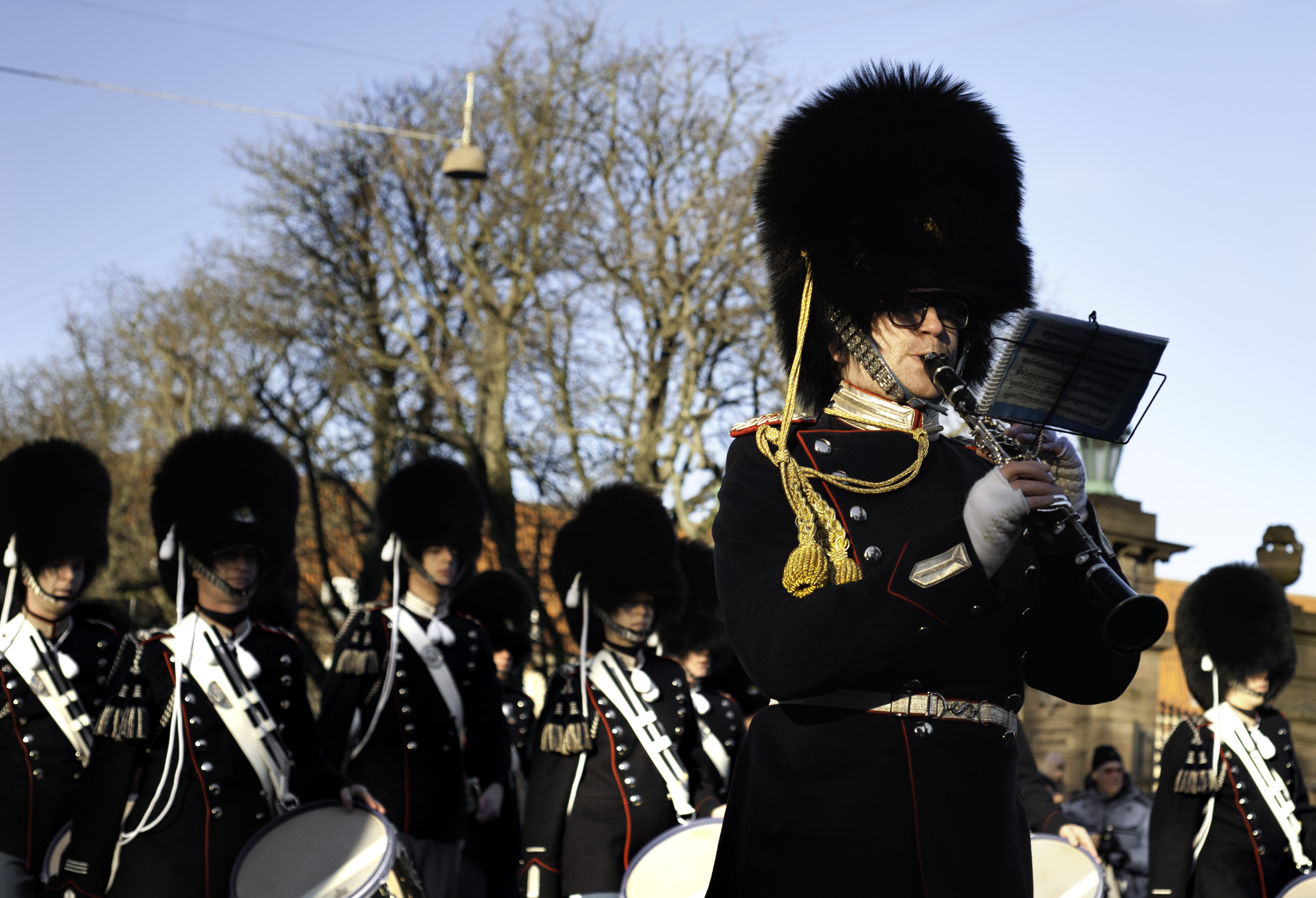
The Marching Band

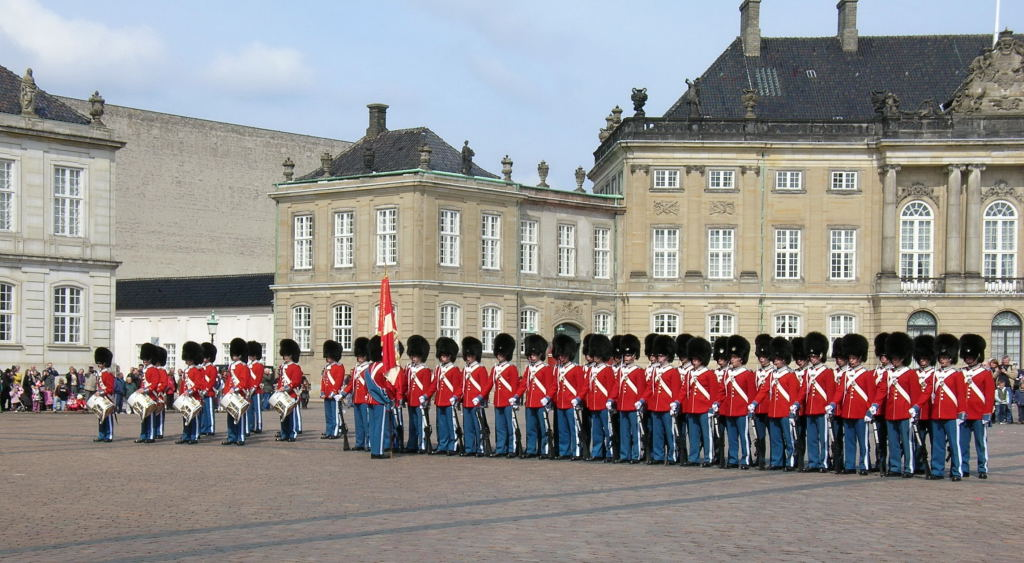
The Corps of Drums

Today, the band performs throughout Denmark and abroad. The DKLM's area of responsibility accounts for the national capital, Copenhagen. When on parade, they wear the full dress uniform of the Life Guards (a scarlet tunic, blue trousers, and a bearskin cap). It is mainly seen accompanying the Guard Company when it executes the changing of the guard in front of Amalienborg, where the band plays traditional military marches. It takes part in the annual Tattoo of Den Kongelige Livgarde at Rosenborg Castle. The repertoire of the DKLM of today is very diverse and spans a lot of genres. The band almost exclusively plays Kong Christian stod ved højen mast, the Royal anthem, in the presence of the monarch or other Danish members of the House of Glücksburg. In addition, to its ceremonial role, musicians of the DKLM are trained infantryman who serve with the regiment.

== Leadership ==
=== Music Director ===
The post of music director of the DKLM refers to the commanding officer of the band. The following have served as music directors of the band:

- Heinrich Gerlach (1808–1838)
- Ludwig Frederik Stockmarr (1822–1862)
- August Otto Dehn (186–1875)
- Vilhelm A.F. Svendsen (1875–1883)
- Jens Ferdinand Vater (1883–1898)
- Carl Andersen (1898–1905)
- Valdemar Nielsen (1905–1922)
- Theodor Marius Lund Dyring (1922–1941)
- Georg August Madsen (1941–1946)
- Kai Verner Nielsen (1946–1961)
- Robert E. Svanesøe Olsen (1961–1973)
- John Hindsberg (1973–1975)
- Uffe Thormod Agerschou (1975–1980)
- John Hindsberg (1980–1982)
- Arne Ole Stein (1982–1983)
- Ib Jespersen (1983–1995)
- Arne Svendsen (1996)
- Peter Harbeck (1996–2009)
- Martin Åkerwall (2010–2011)
- Stig Jørgensen (2011–2016)
- David Palmquist (2016–present)

=== Drum Major ===
The Drum Major (Stabstambourer) is the de facto leader of the band when it is on parade and is responsible for keeping the marching band in cadence and on beat.

== Unit Structure ==
The band is composed of two main components, the marching band and the corps of drums.

=== Marching Band ===
The marching band accompanies the Guard Company during official ceremonies. It performs in ceremonies in the Copenhagen metropolitan area, taking part in state funerals, change of commands, town parades, wreath laying ceremonies and arrival ceremonies.

=== Corps of Drums ===
The Corps of Drums (Tambourkorps) is a percussion unit made up of 16 musicians of the DKLM. Half of the band performs on drums while the other half performs on flutes and fifes. In addition, most members of the corps of drums play on trumpets, which is used mostly in the Bb key for tattoos, reveille, and retreats. Since 2005, the corps of drums has not employed conscripts in its ranks, with service being reduced from 12 months to 8 months at present.

=== Other components ===
The DKLM also maintains several small ensembles and groups, such as a brass quintet, a concert band, and a big band.
