= Royal Guard Company (Denmark) =

The Royal Guard Company
- Vagtkompagniet
- Emblem of the Danish Royal Life Guards Guard Company
- Active: 1659 – present (367 years ago)
- Country: Kingdom of Denmark
- Branch: Royal Danish Army
- Type: Foot Guards
- Role: Public Duties
- Size: 300 (about 400 after 1st of December 2019)
- Part of: Royal Life Guards
- Garrison/HQ: Rosenborg Barracks
- Nicknames: Livgarden, Garden
- Mottos: Pro Rege et Grege (For King and people)
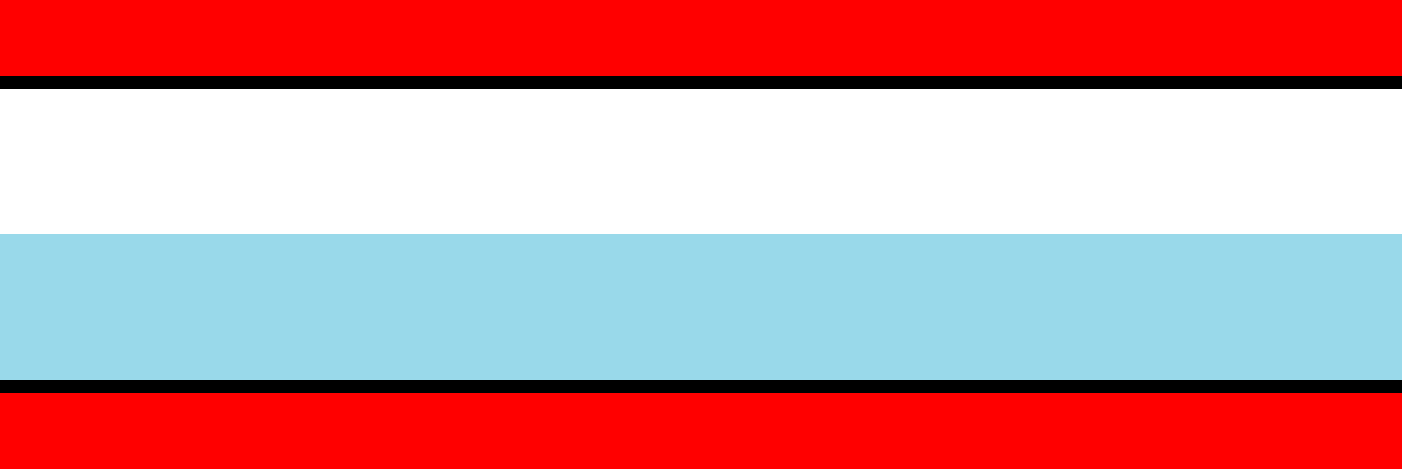
- Stable belt
- Website: Official website

Commanders
- Current commander: Major H. C. Rørvang
- Ceremonial chief: HM King Frederik X

The Royal Guard Company (Danish: Vagtkompagniet) is part of Royal Life Guards which serves as an active protection force for the Danish royal family. Of the 300 in the company, 280 are conscripts.

== Organisation ==
There are 4 Guard teams of approximately 80 conscripts and 8 sergeants. The teams are arranged by height, with the tallest conscripts serving in 1st team and the shortest in 4th team.

=== Guard duties ===
The Royal Life Guards provide a permanent guard at the Amalienborg Palace, Kastellet (part of the old fortification of Copenhagen), Rosenborg Castle/garrison of the Royal Life Guards in Copenhagen and the garrison of Høvelte. On occasions guard is kept at Fredensborg Palace, Marselisborg Palace, Gråsten Palace, Christiansborg Palace and other locations inside the Danish Realm.

== Drum Corps ==
One part of the Guard Company is the Fife and drum corps (Danish: Livgardens Tambourkorps), which consists of 8 drums and 8 fifes. It originally consisted of conscripts, however, after the Defence agreement 2005–09 which changed the conscription time for Life Guards from 12 to 8 months, there was not enough time to train the conscripts. The corps therefore, is made up of mostly enlisted, alongside a handful of specially selected conscripts.

== Traditions ==
=== Uniform ===
The review order uniform of the Royal Life Guards, worn while they are on guard duty, consists of bearskin headdresses, dark blue tunics and light blue trousers with white stripes. The ceremonial uniform, worn on special state occasions, substitutes a scarlet tunic for the dark blue. The bearskin dates from 1803 and is decorated with the regiment's bronze cap badge (the Sun and Royal Coat of Arms). Symbolic infantry sabers are carried by the rank and file. These were part of the spoils from the First Schleswig War of 1848–1851 and were originally derived from a French infantry weapon.

=== King's Watch ===
The regiment holds a traditional military parade every 4 months, at their barracks known as the "King's Parade". Following the parade, the sovereign hands over the “King’s Watch” to one guard for his/her exceptional service in the regiment. It has been a tradition since 1970, when Frederik IX first handed over a watch at a parade. The "King’s Watch” was known as the "Queen’s Watch” from 1972-2024 during the reign of Margrethe II and became known once again as the King's Watch after the accession of Frederik X in 2024. The guard is appointed by their superiors and fellow soldiers.

== Image gallery ==
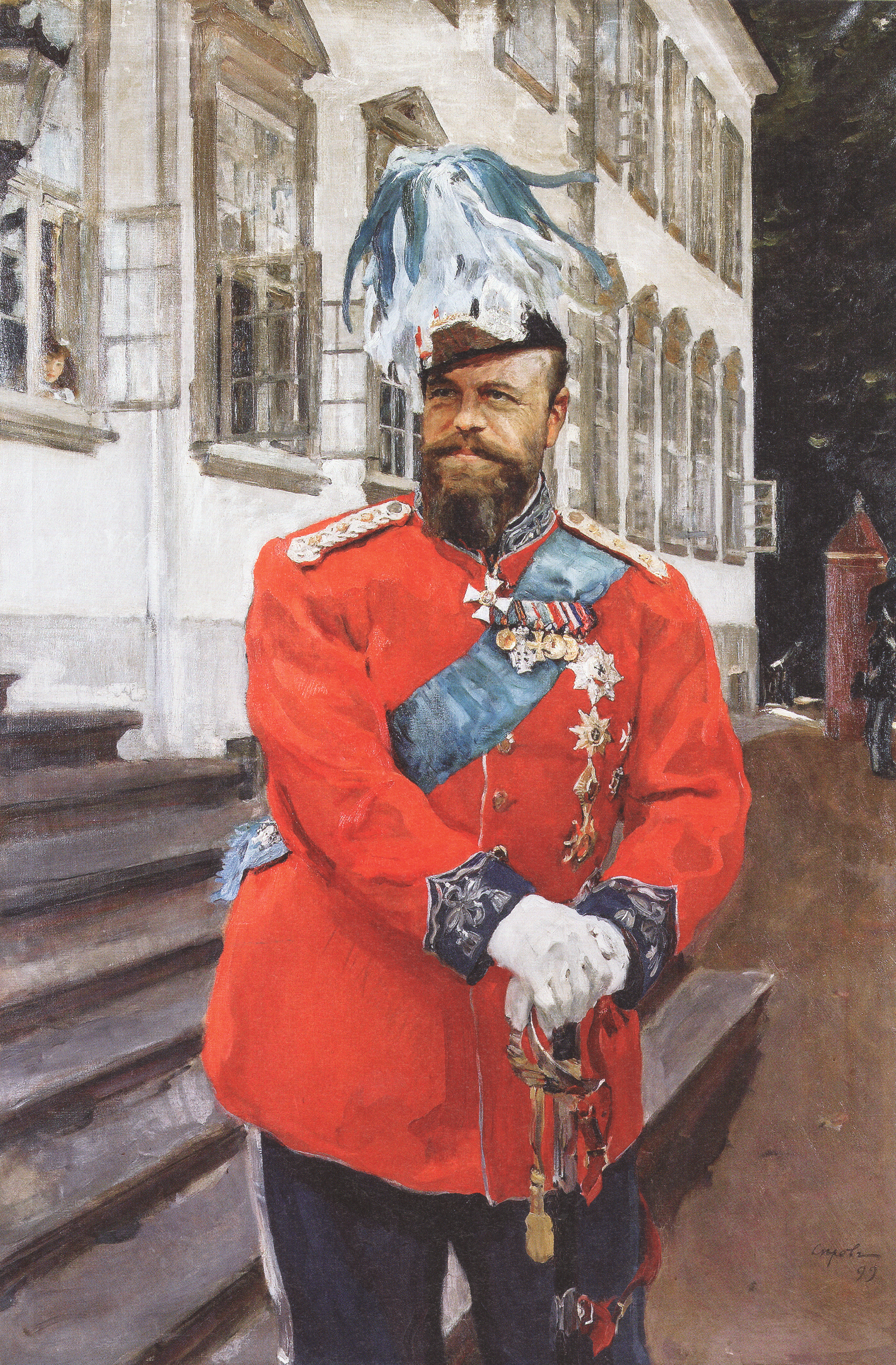
Alexander III in Danish Royal Life Guards Uniform, 1899

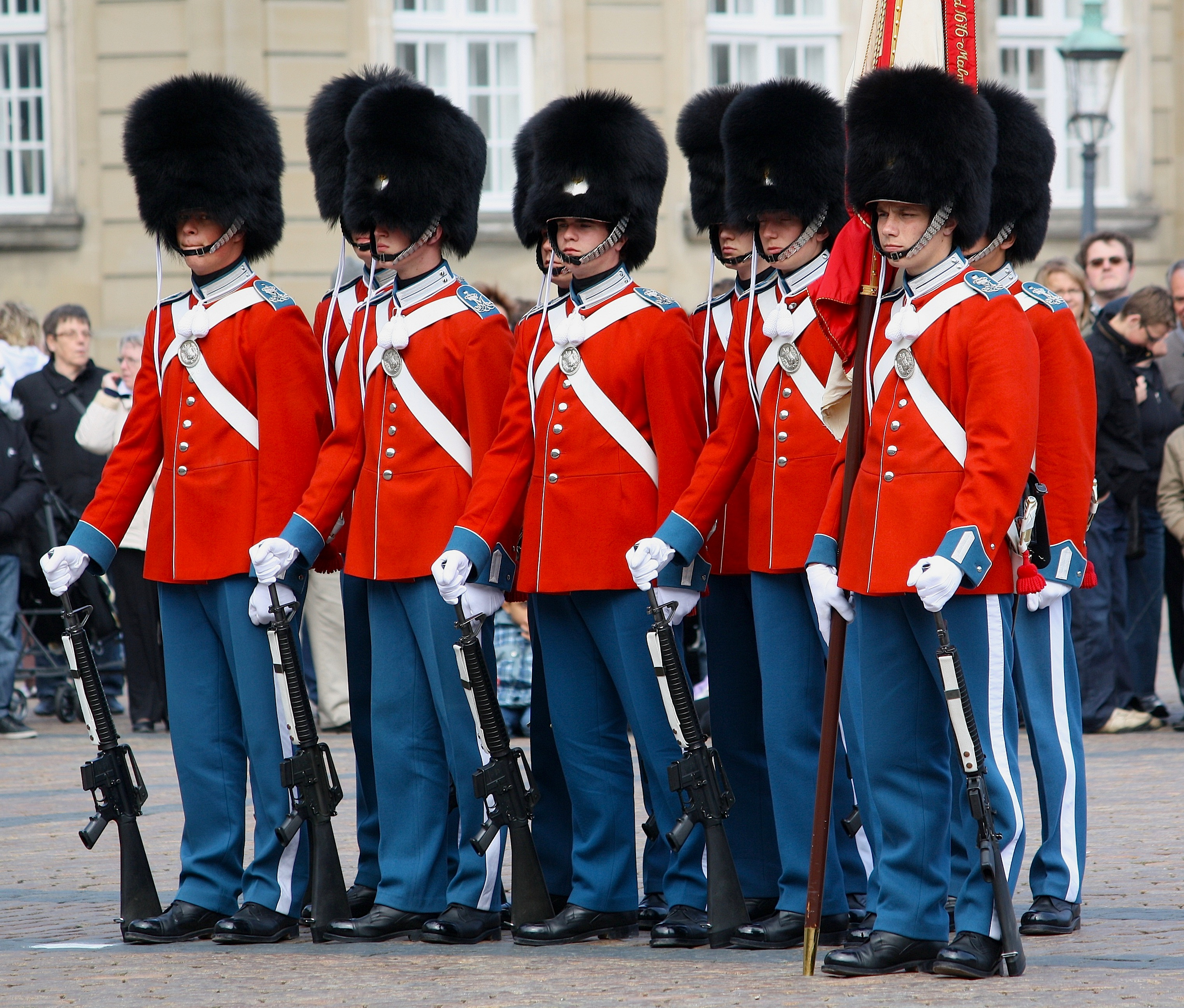
Royal Guards on Queen Margrethe II's Birthday, 16 April 2009.

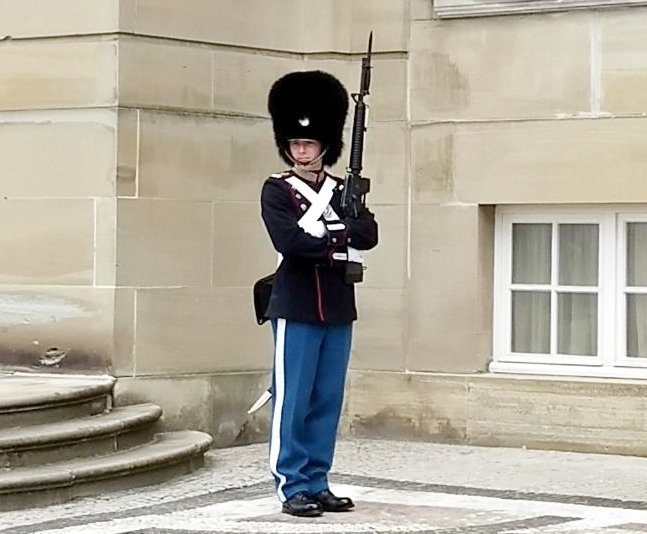
Royal Guard at the Amalienborg Palace, Copenhagen.

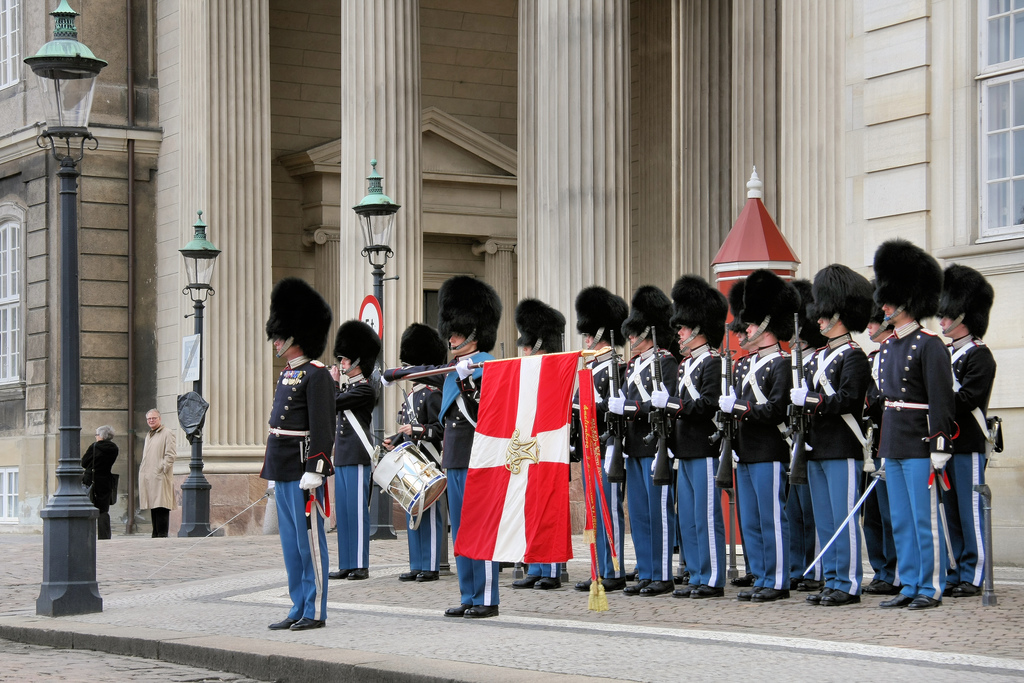
Danish Royal Guards presenting arms at the Changing of the Guard ceremony, Amalienborg.

== See also ==
- Royal Life Guards (Denmark)
- Guard Hussar Regiment (Denmark)
  - Guard Hussar Regiment Mounted Squadron
