= Danish Royal Life Guards' Mutiny =

Mutiny and revolt in copenhagen, 1771

Royal Life Guards' Mutiny
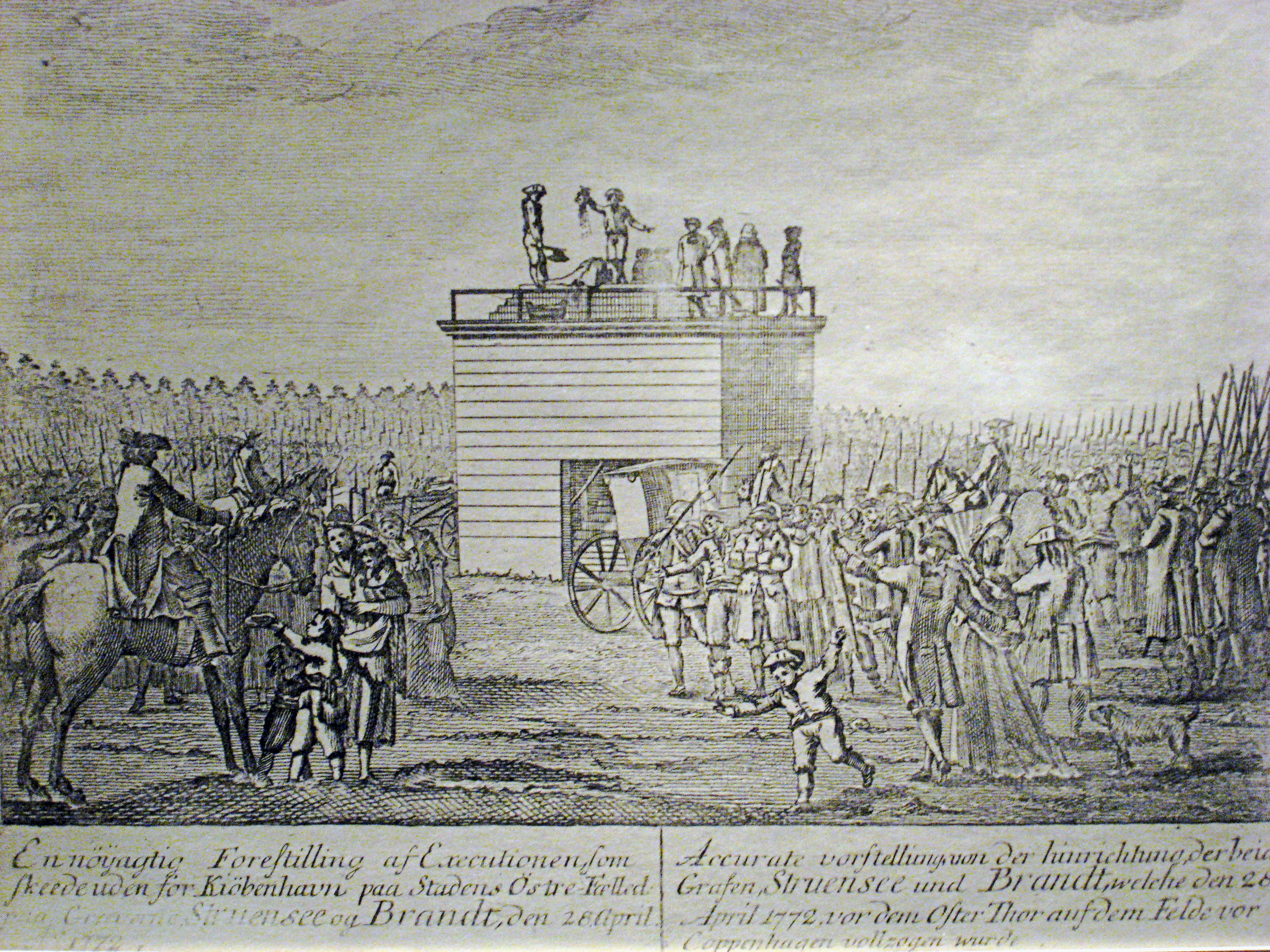
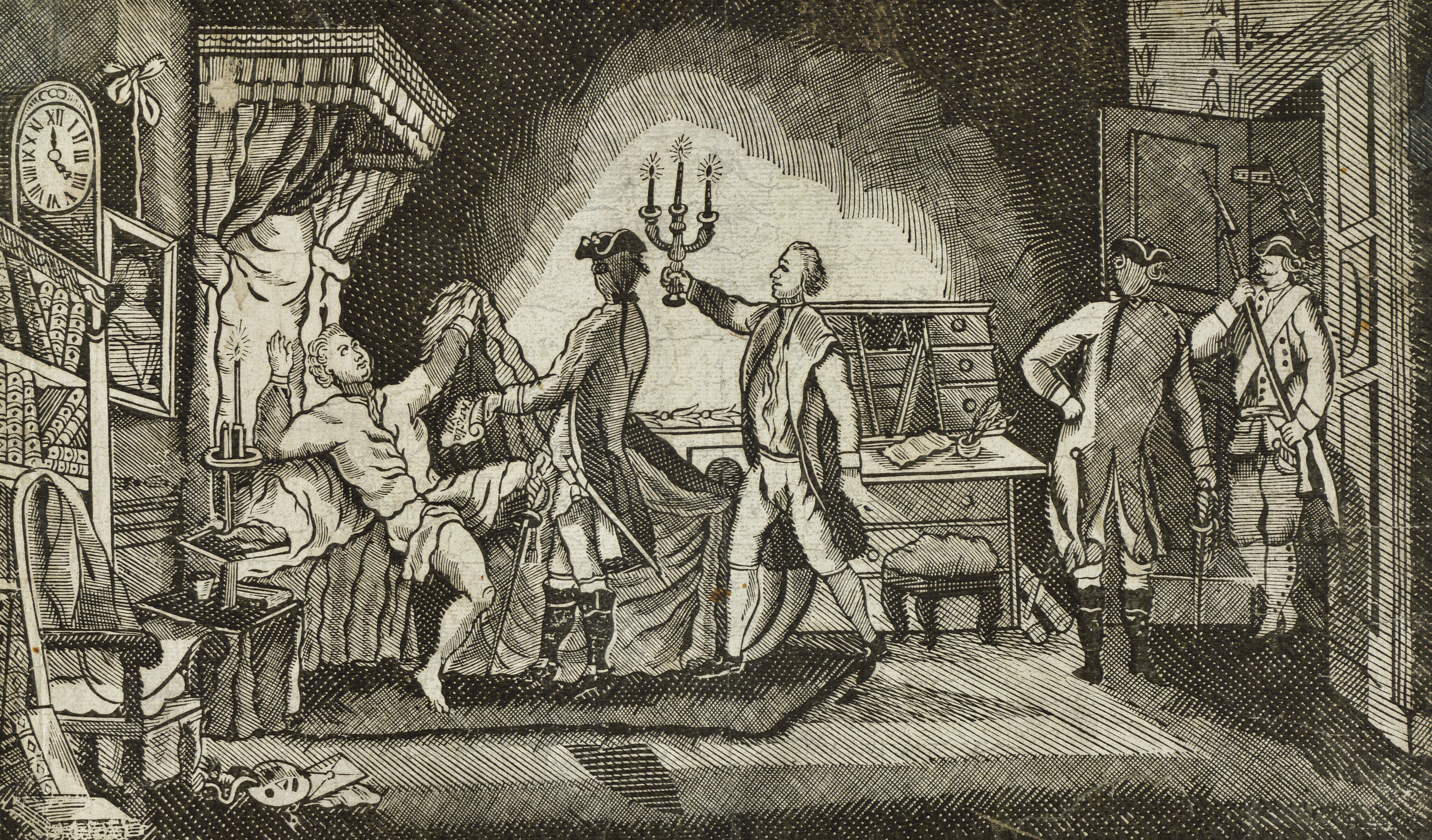
- Top: Execution of Johann Friedrich Struensee; Bottom: Johann Friedrich Struensee arrestation
Date	24–25 December 1771
Location	Copenhagen, Denmark-Norway 55°40′34″N 12°34′06″E
Result	See aftermath
Territorial changes	Status quo

Belligerents
Denmark–Norway	Royal Life Guard

Commanders and leaders
(Denmark–Norway) Johann Struensee (executed) (Denmark–Norway) de Saint-Germain (Denmark–Norway) Henrik Gude (Denmark–Norway) Ulrik von Kardorff	Arnold Haxthausen von Köller-Banner

Units involved
Dragon regiment	Royal Life Guards; Falster Foot Regiment

Strength
Unknown	300 men

Casualties and losses
Unknown	Unknown

The Royal Life Guards' Mutiny (Danish: Den kongelige livgardes Mytteri) also known as the Christmas Eve Feud (Danish: Julefejden) was an open revolt by the Danish Royal Life Guards against the decision of royal adviser, Johann Friedrich Struensee, to abolish the life guards in order to reform the Danish military.

== Background ==
Danish Royal Court

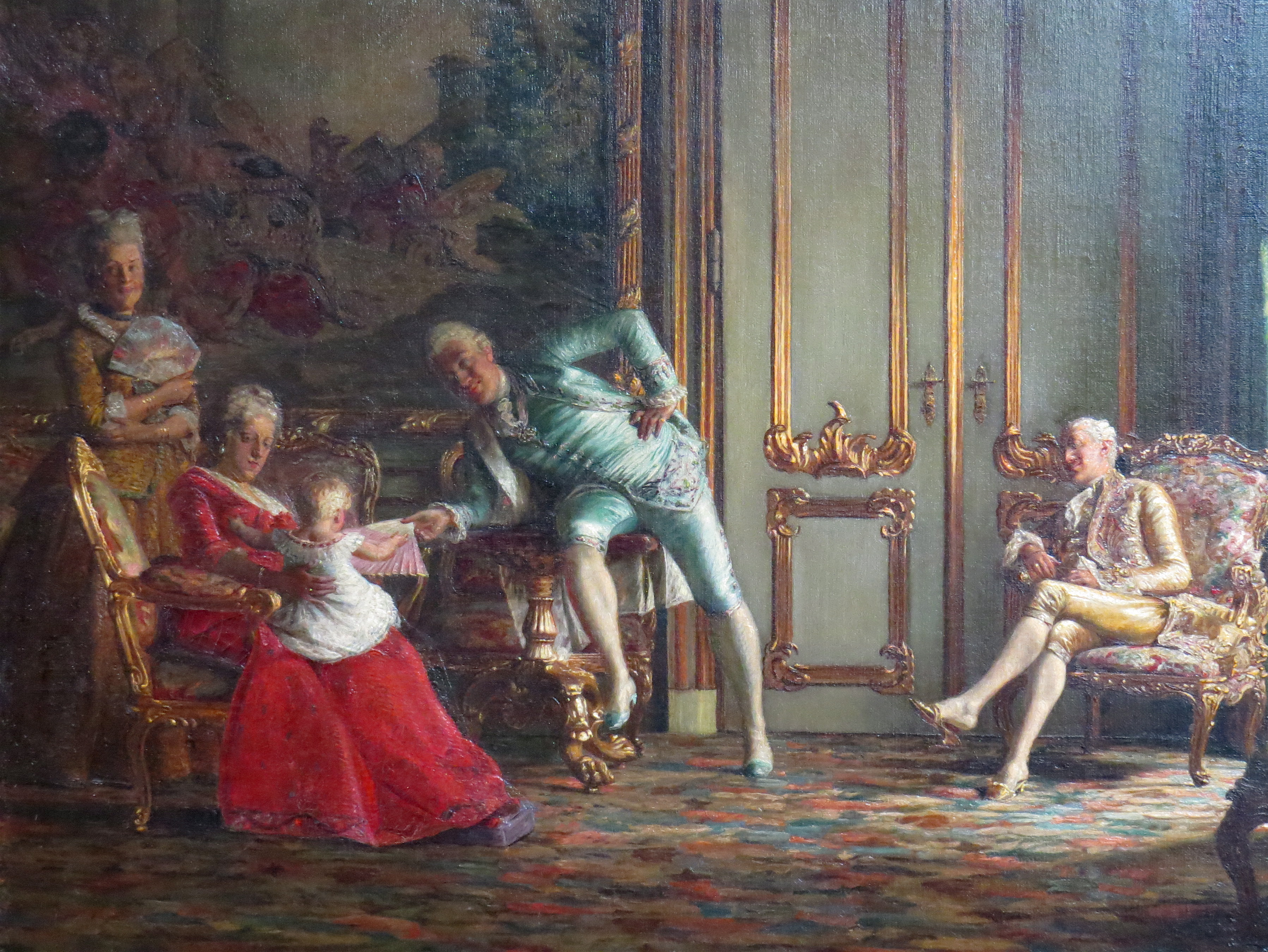
Scene at the Copenhagen court with Struensee, Caroline Mathilde and Christian VII

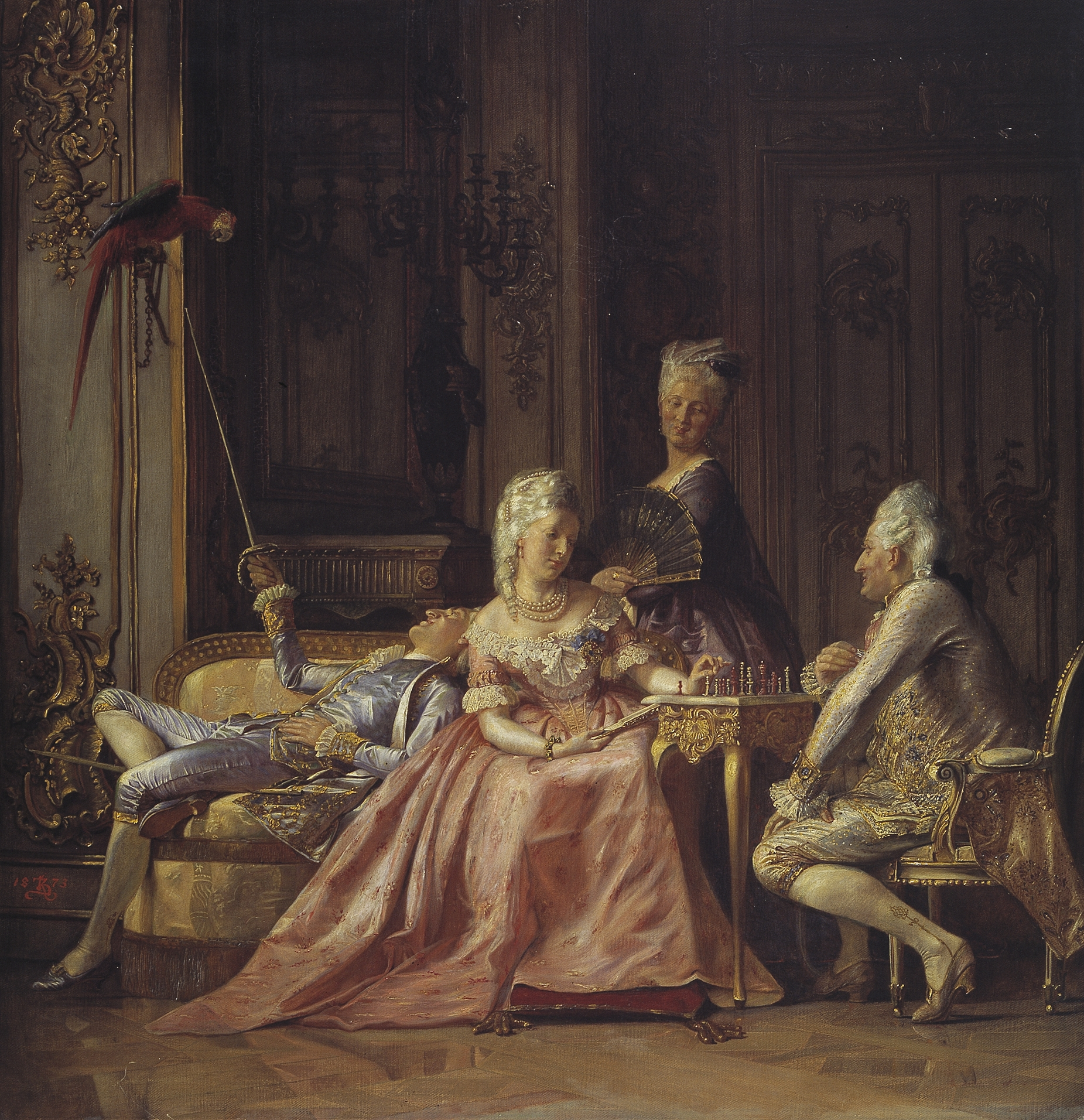
Scene from Christian VII's court

Christian VII's reign was marked by his mental illnesses which affected governmental decisions. During 1770, king Christian sank into a condition of physical inertness which meant that, German born, Johann Friedrich Struensee, who was already a personal physician to the king, now became the royal forelæser (adviser) and konferensråd (conference councillor.) This made Struensee a de facto dictator and on 15 September a one-year and four month long period began, later known as Struenseetiden (English: The Time of Struensee)

=== Reforms by Struensee ===
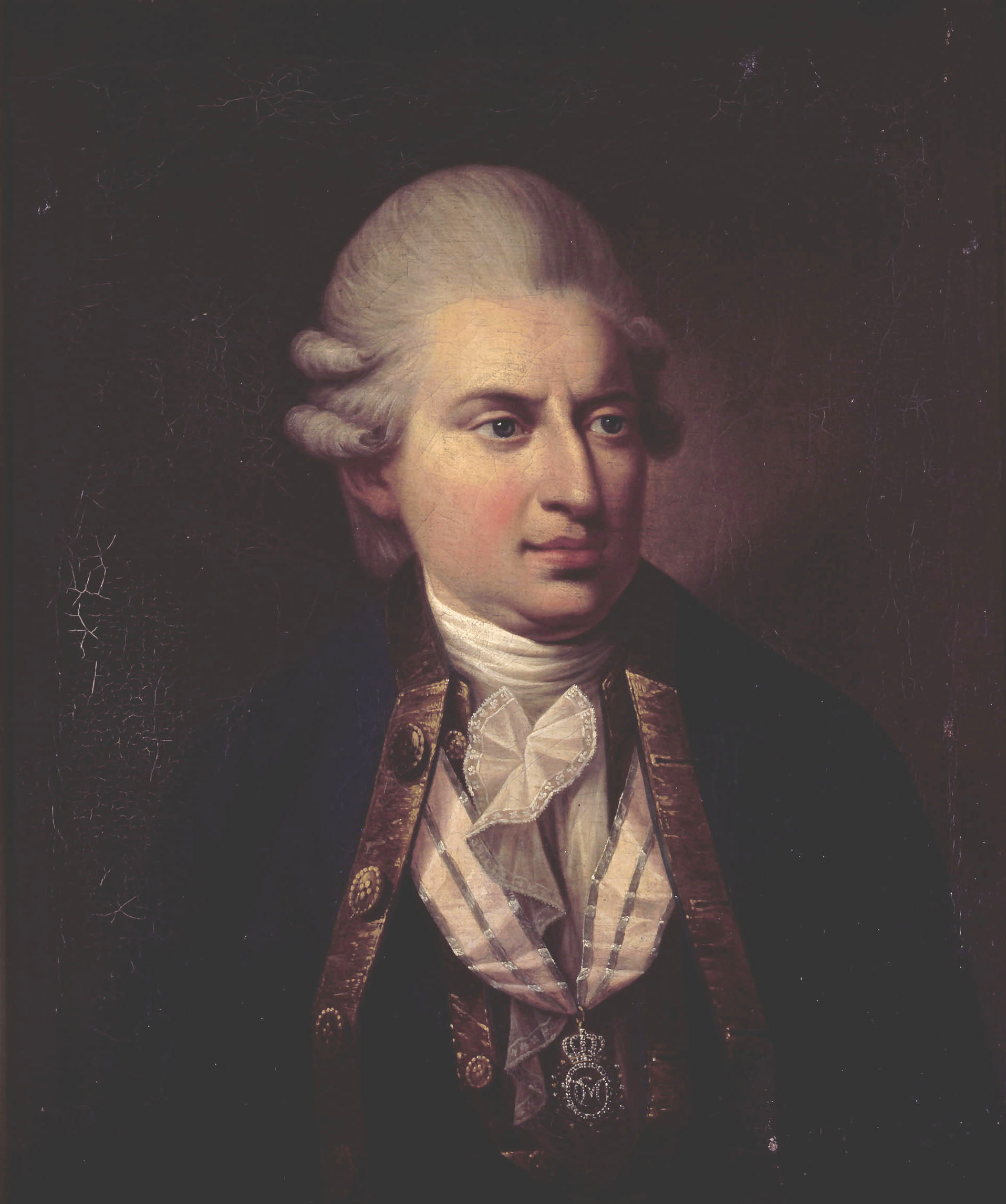
Johann Friedrich Struensee, de facto ruler of Denmark-Norway (r.1770-1772), by Jens Juel

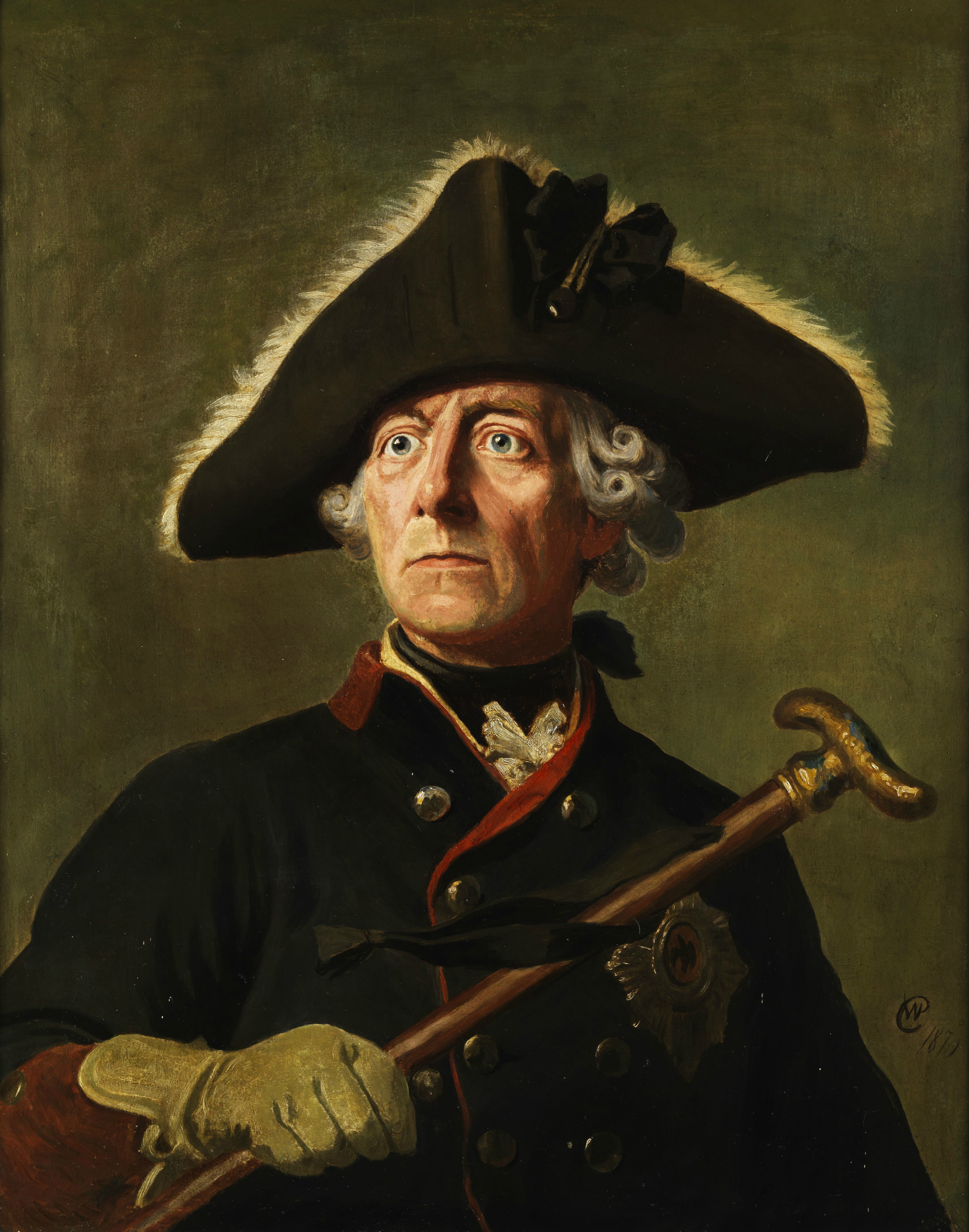
Frederick the Great, king of Prussia (r.1740–1786), by Wilhelm Camphausen

During his short 16-month rule, Struensee made reforms that strengthened his own personal power, such as abolishing the council of state and Norwegian viceroyship, dismissing all department heads, and appointing himself as maître des requêtes. with his authoritarian cabinet, with himself as the one supreme authority in the state, he issued 1.069 cabinet orders and reforms Some of his reforms included; the abolition of torture, unfree labor and several holidays, but he also re-organized and reduced the Royal Danish Army.

== Prussian model ==
"The Time of Struensee" coincided with the reign of Frederick the Great who reformed his own military enabling Prussia to act as a great power. Struensee, who himself was born and raised in Halle, Prussia was heavily interested in the new Prussian militarism He, along with Claude Louis, Comte de Saint-Germain, who had been Danish Secretary of War for the Army and had previously served Prussia during the Seven Years' War, re-organised the Danish military by imitating the new Prussian Model during the 1760s and 1770s

One of these reforms, was the abolishment of the Royal Life Guards. First to be disbanded were the Cavalry regiments of the Royal Life Guard in May 1771, followed by the Foot regiments of the Guard in December the same year.

Saint-German argued that the life guards were parade units of the royal household, and were without real military significance. On the other hand, the people against the abolition argued that the Royal Life Guard consisted of native Danes and Norwegians, in contrast to the rest of the Danish army which was primarily recruited from enlisted foreigners mainly from German States. The public had seen this employment of mercenaries as a Germanisation of Denmark-Norway. This meant that the news of the abolishment of the Royal Life Guard on 24 December 1771, were not well received.

== Mutiny ==
The Royal Life Guards expressed their outrage by shouting "The guards or resign" on the festive day. When a grenadier regiment came to replace them, the Life Guards forced the grenadiers out of the Christiansborg Palace with their bayonets. The turmoil spread to Kongens Nytorv and surrounding streets and the situation was soon out of control. The revolt was supported by many Copenhageners who were also dissatisfied with Struensee's reforms. The guards marched to Frederiksborg Castle to negotiate with king Christian. Struensee, who feared the mutiny, was quick to accept the demands of the soldiers. On the evening of 24 December, the military commander of Copenhagen received orders to "clear" the castle square for guards before dawn, by any means necessary.

Execution

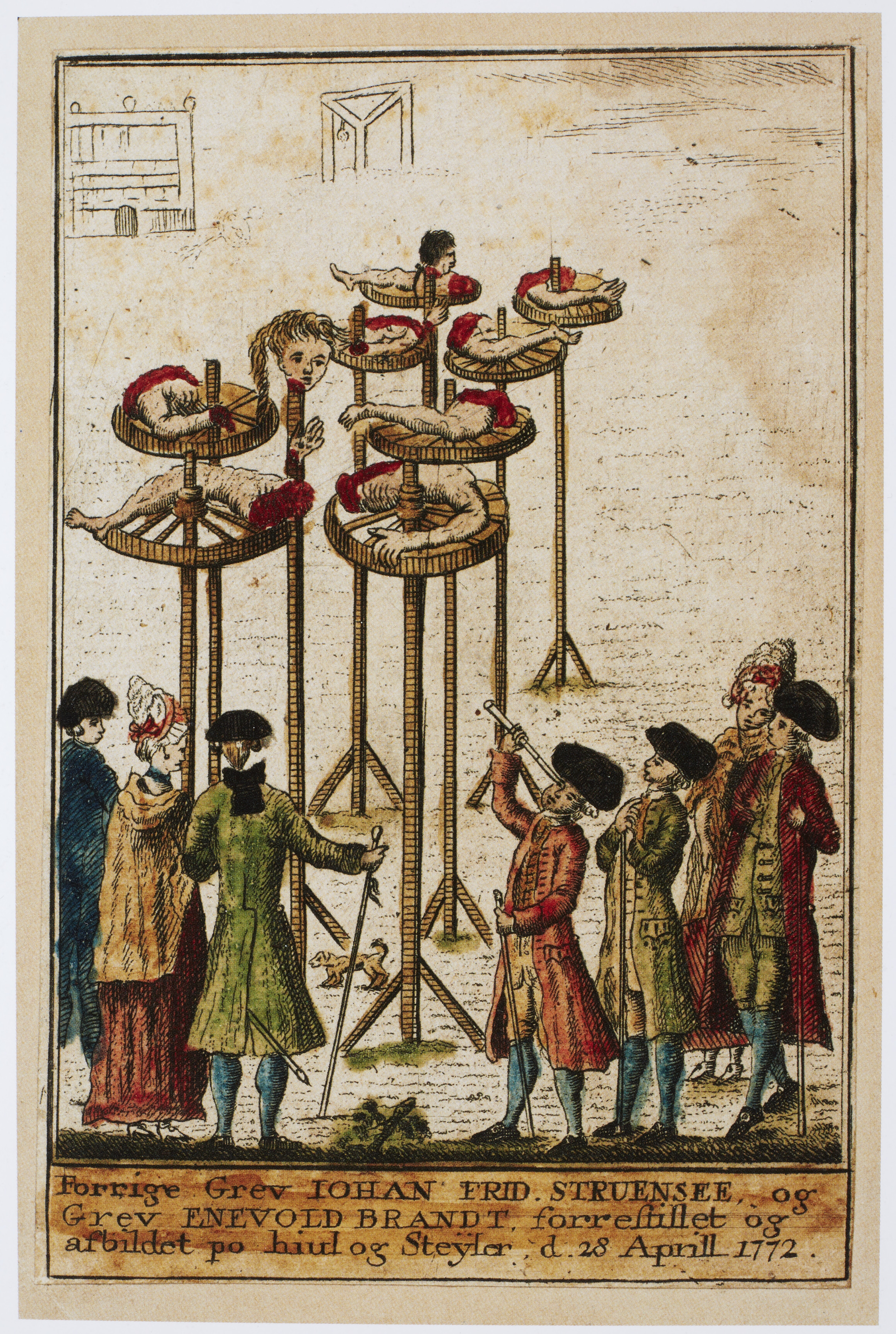
Struensee and Brandt's body parts on wheels and pillars

Large numbers of the Copenhagen garrison were ordered to assemble on the square at 1 AM. However, the officers of the Life Guards, who were not participating in the mutiny, were able to persuade their guardsmen to return to their homes. On 25 December, Christmas Day, all guardsmen who wished to do so were granted travel documents and allowed to return their home as discharged men, still in their uniforms.

== Aftermath ==
Struensee, disturbed by the military revolt, issued a cabinet order on 6 January 1772, completely disbanding the Royal Life Guard and made the wearing of guard uniforms illegal. Although not foreseen by Struensee, this measure marked the final straw in terms of popular opinion. On 17 January 1772 Struensee was arrested by the commander of the Falster Regiment of Foot, Georg Ludwig von Köller-Banner and other officers.

Following Struensee's arrest, Copenhageners stormed over 50 brothels in protest against his rule. Dragoons were called in to settle the unrest. The Royal Life Guards were promptly reformed. An extraordinary court sentenced Struensee to execution on 28 January 1772.

== See also ==
- Christian VII of Denmark – King of Denmark and Norway from 1766 to 1808
- Frederick VI of Denmark – King of Denmark (1808–39) and Norway (1808–14)
- Frederick, Hereditary Prince of Denmark – Regent of Denmark–Norway from 1772 to 1784
- Revolution of 1772 – Coup by Gustav III of Sweden
- German militarism – Militaristic culture present in Germany between 1815 and 1945
