= Falster Regiment of Foot =

Falster Foot Regiment
- Falsterske Fodregiment
- Active: 1 November 1961
- Disbanded: 1981
- Country: Denmark
- Branch: Royal Danish Army
- Type: Mechanized infantry
- Size: Regiment
- Part of: Eastern Region Command
- Garrison/HQ: Vordingborg Kaserne
- Motto(s): Stærk og Sej (Strong and Tough)
- Engagements: Royal Life Guards' Mutiny

The Falster Foot Regiment (Danish: Falsterske Fodregiment) was a mechanized infantry regiment. On 1 August 1976 it was amalgamated into the Danish Life Regiment, where four out of five battalions continued to exist until 1981.

== History ==
The Falsterske Fodregiment can trace its history back to 1747. The regiment was garrisoned in Copenhagen until 1758, then in Rendsburg, to return to Copenhagen in 1763. In 1779 the regiment moved to Aalborg, as the rank and file primarily came from Nørrejylland. It stayed here till 1816, then for a brief time relocated to Copenhagen, to return to Aalborg again in 1820. The Regiment remained in Aalborg until 1913, whence it relocated to Roskilde and from 1 November 1951 to Vordingborg.

The Regiment has participated in the wars, Slaget på Reden (1801), Gunboat War (1807–1814), First Schleswig War (1848–1850) and Second Schleswig War (1864).

The regimental flag has the battle honours Bov 1848, Slesvig 1848, Isted 1850 and Sankelmark 1864.

== Organisation ==
Disband units

- 1st battalion (I/FAFR), Mechanized infantry Battalion.(1961–1981)
- 2nd battalion (II/FAFR), Infantry Battalion. (1961–1981)
- 3rd battalion (III/FAFR), Infantry Battalion. (1961–1981)
- 4th battalion (IV/FAFR), Infantry Battalion. (1961–1981)
- 5th battalion (V/FAFR), Infantry Battalion. (1961–1976)
- 5th Brigade Staff Company/2nd Zealand Brigade. (1961–1976)
- Falster Regiment of Foot Music Corps, (1961–1976)

== Names of the regiment ==
Names
Falsterske Geworbne Infanteriregiment	Falster Recruited Infantry Regiment	1747-03-08	–	1785
Aalborgske Infanteriregiment	Aalborg Infantry Regiment	1785	–	1790
3. Jyske Infanteriregiment	3rd Jutlandic Infantry Regiment	1790	–	1842
11. Linie Infanteri-Bataillon	11th Line Infantry Battalion	1842	–	1860
11. Infanteri-Bataillon	11th Infantry Battalion	1860	–	1863
11. Infanteri-Bataillon	11th Infantry Battalion	1860	–	1863
11. Infanteri-Regiment	11th Infantry Regiment	1863	–	1865
11. Infanteri-Bataillon	11th Infantry Battalion	1865	–	1867
11. Bataillon	11th Battalion	1867	–	1951-11-01
5. Regiment	5th Regiment	1951-11-01	–	1961-11-01
Falsterske Fodregiment	Falster Regiment of Foot	1961-11-01	–	1976-08-01

== Standards ==
Historical standards of the regiment

Aalborg Infantry Regiment
3rd Jutlandic Infantry Regiment
(1785–1842)

11th Battalion
(1912–1947)
