= Danish Life Regiment =

- Danske Livregiment
- Active: 1961–2001
- Disbanded: 1 January 2001
- Country: Kingdom of Denmark
- Branch: Royal Danish Army
- Role: Mechanized infantry
- Size: Four battalions
- Garrison: Høvelte Kaserne (1961–1976); Vordingborg Kaserne (1976–2000)
- Motto(s): Fremad På Ny (Forward again)
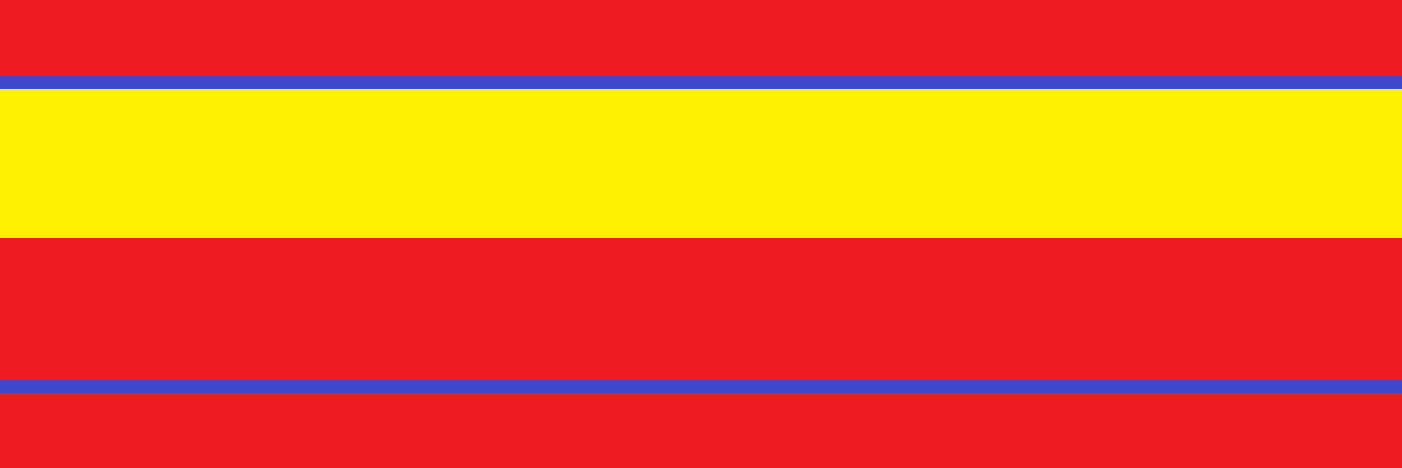
- Regimental belt
- March: Tak For Din Dåd (Thank You For Your deed)

The Danish Life Regiment (Danish: Danske Livregiment) was an infantry regiment of the Royal Danish Army. On 1 January 2001 it was merged with the Zealand Life Regiment, into the Guard Hussar Regiment.

== History ==
The Danish Life Regiment trace its history back to 1763 when it was raised from a mix of Danes and German mercenaries. The Regiment participated in the Slaget på Reden (1801), the Gunboat War (1807-1814), First Schleswig War (1848-1850) and Second Schleswig War (1864). The regimental flag had the battle honours Bov 1848, Slesvig 1848, Fredericia 1849, Isted 1850 and Sankelmark 1864.

In 1976 Falsterske Fodregiment was merged into the regiment and Danish Life Regiment was then responsible for four of their own and four of Falsterske Fodregiment battalions until 1982.

In 2001 the regiment, with two battalions, was merged into Gardehusarregimentet. The last two battalions were transferred to the Royal Life Guards.

== Organisation ==
Disband units

- 1st battalion (I/DLR), Mechanized infantry Battalion from 1968.(1961-2000)
- 2nd battalion (II/DLR), Mechanized infantry Battalion from 1983. (1961-2000)
- 3rd battalion (III/DLR), Infantry Battalion. (1961-2000)
- 4th battalion (IV/DLR), Infantry Battalion. (1961-2000)
- 5th Brigade Staff Company/2nd Zealand Brigade. (1976-2000)
- 5th Anti-tank Company/2nd Zealand Brigade. (1961-1974)

and from 1976 to 1981:

- 1st battalion (I/FAFR), Mechanized infantry Battalion.(1975-1982)
- 2nd battalion (II/FAFR), Infantry Battalion. (1975-1982)
- 3rd battalion (III/FAFR), Infantry Battalion. (1975-1982)
- 4th battalion (IV/FAFR), Infantry Battalion. (1975-1982)

== Names of the regiment ==
Names
| Danske Livregiment til Fods | Danish Life Regiment on Foot | 1763-12-07 | – | 1819 |
| 1. Livregiment til Fods | 1st Life Regiment on Foot | 1819 | – | 1842 |
| 1. Linie Infanteribataillon | 1st Line Infantry Battalion | 1842 | – | 1848 |
| 1. Lette Infanteribataillon | 1st Light Infantry Battalion | 1848 | – | 1855 |
| 1. Linie Infanteribataillon | 1st Line Infantry Battalion | 1855 | – | 1860 |
| 1. Infanteribataillon | 1st Infantry Battalion | 1860 | – | 1863 |
| 1. Infanteriregiment | 1st Infantry Regiment | 1863 | – | 1865 |
| 1. Infanteribataillon | 1st Infantry Battalion | 1865 | – | 1867 |
| 1. Bataillon | 1st Battalion | 1867 | – | 1951 |
| 1. Regiment | 1st Regiment | 1951-11-01 | – | 1961-11-01 |
| Danske Livregiment | Danish Life Regiment | 1961-11-01 | – | 2001-01-01 |

== Standards ==
Historical standards of the regiment

Danish Life Regiment on Foot
(1790–1819)

1st Battalion
(1912–1947)
