= Royal Life Guards (Denmark) =

The Royal Life Guard
- Den Kongelige Livgarde
- Coat of arms
- Active: 30 June 1658 – present (368 years, 1 month)
- Country: Denmark
- Branch: Royal Danish Army
- Type: Foot Guards
- Role: 1st Battalion – Mechanized infantry 2nd Battalion – Training; Guards Company – Public Duties
- Size: Three battalions & one company
- Part of: Army Staff
- Garrison/HQ: Høvelte; Livgardens Kaserne
- Nicknames: Livgarden, Garden
- Mottos: Pro Rege et Grege (For King and People)
- Engagements: Northern Wars; Scanian War; Great Northern War; Royal Life Guards' Mutiny; Napoleonic Wars; First War of Schleswig; Second War of Schleswig; Operation Weserübung; War in Afghanistan (2001–2021); Post-invasion Iraq, 2003–2011; Operation Inherent Resolve; Resolute Support Mission
- Website: Official website

Commanders
- Current commander: Colonel Mads Rahbek
- Ceremonial chief: HM Queen Margrethe II of Denmark
- Chief of the Guard Company: Major H. C. Rørvang
- Notable commanders: Duke William of Württemberg; Christian X of Denmark; Alexander III of Russia

Insignia
- Cap Badge of the Royal Danish Guard

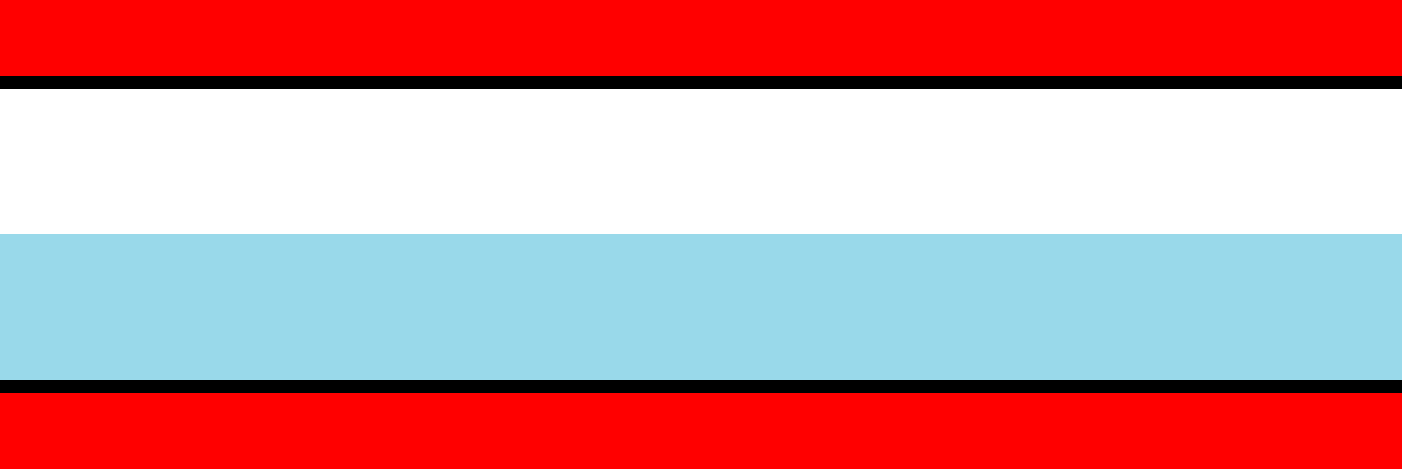
- Regimental belt

- Colours

The Royal Life Guards (Danish: Den Kongelige Livgarde) is a mechanized infantry regiment of the Royal Danish Army, founded in 1658 by King Frederik III. The primary task is to provide a number of soldiers from the Guard Company to serve as a guard/ceremonial unit to the Danish monarchy, while training the Royal Guards for various functions in the mobilisation force. Until its disbandment, the Royal Horse Guards (Danish: Livgarden til Hest), served the role as the mounted guard/ceremonial unit, afterwards the role was taken over by Guard Hussar Regiment Mounted Squadron. During the time period 1684–1867, the Royal Life Guards were called The Royal Foot Guard (Danish: Den Kongelige Livgarde til Fods), in order to distinguish between the regiment and the Royal Horse Guards.

== History ==
The Royal Life Guards were established by Frederik III of Denmark on 30 June 1658, the guards were both to protect Frederik and to be a combat troop regiment.

== Role ==
The Royal Lifeguards serve as a front-line unit and as a protective guard ceremonial unit to the Danish monarchy. They are the security regiment for the Danish Royal family and their personal estates. They play a role in international peacekeeping due to Denmark's involvement with NATO. The regiment can be deployed internationally for peacekeeping efforts.

== Organisation ==
The regiment consists of two infantry battalions, the Guard Company and the Musical Corps:

- 1st Battalion – Founded 1658. Mechanized Infantry Battalion, part of 1st Brigade. Plus Ultra (Even further)
  - Staff Company (STKMP/I/LG)
  - 1st Armored Infantry Company (Army's Flank company ) (1/I/LG)
  - 2nd Mechanized Infantry Company (2/I/LG)
  - 4th Mechanized Infantry Company (4/I/LG)(inactive)
- 2nd Battalion – Founded 1867. Mechanized Infantry Battalion, Vincere Volumus (We'll be victorious)
  - Staff Company (STKMP/II/LG)(inactive)
  - 1st Mechanized Infantry Company (1/II/LG)
  - 2nd Basic Training Company (2/II/LG)
  - 3rd Basic Training Company (3/II/LG)
- Royal Guard Company (Vagtkompagniet) - Founded 1659. Ceremonial/guard unit.
- Royal Life Guard Music Band (Den Kongelige Livgardes Musikkorps) - Founded 1658. Musical unit.

Disbanded units

- 3rd Battalion – Founded 1923, Disbanded 2018. Infantry (basic training) Battalion. (Mechanized Infantry Battalion 2000-2004)
- 4th Battalion – Founded 1961, Disbanded 2005. Infantry Battalion.
- 5th Battalion – Founded 2001, Disbanded 2005. Infantry Battalion. (Merged in from 3rd Btn/Danish Life Regiment, only as reserve)
- 6th Battalion – Founded 2001, Disbanded 2005. Infantry Battalion. (Merged in from 4th Btn/Danish Life Regiment, only as reserve)
- 7th Battalion – Founded 2001, Disbanded 2005. Infantry Battalion. (Merged in from 4th Btn/Zealand Life Regiment, only as reserve)

== Names of the regiment ==
Names
Hans kongelige Majestæts Livregiment	His Royal Majesty's Life Regiment	1658	–	1684
Vor Garde til Fods	Our Guard on Foot	1684	–	1763
Den kongelige Livgarde til Fods	Royal Life Guard on Foot	1763	–	1867
Livgarden	Life Guard	1867	–	1961
Den kongelige Livgarde	Royal Life Guard	1961	–	present

== Alliances ==
- United Kingdom – The Princess of Wales's Royal Regiment (Queen's and Royal Hampshires) – Bond of Friendship
- Germany – Bundeswehr

== Image gallery ==
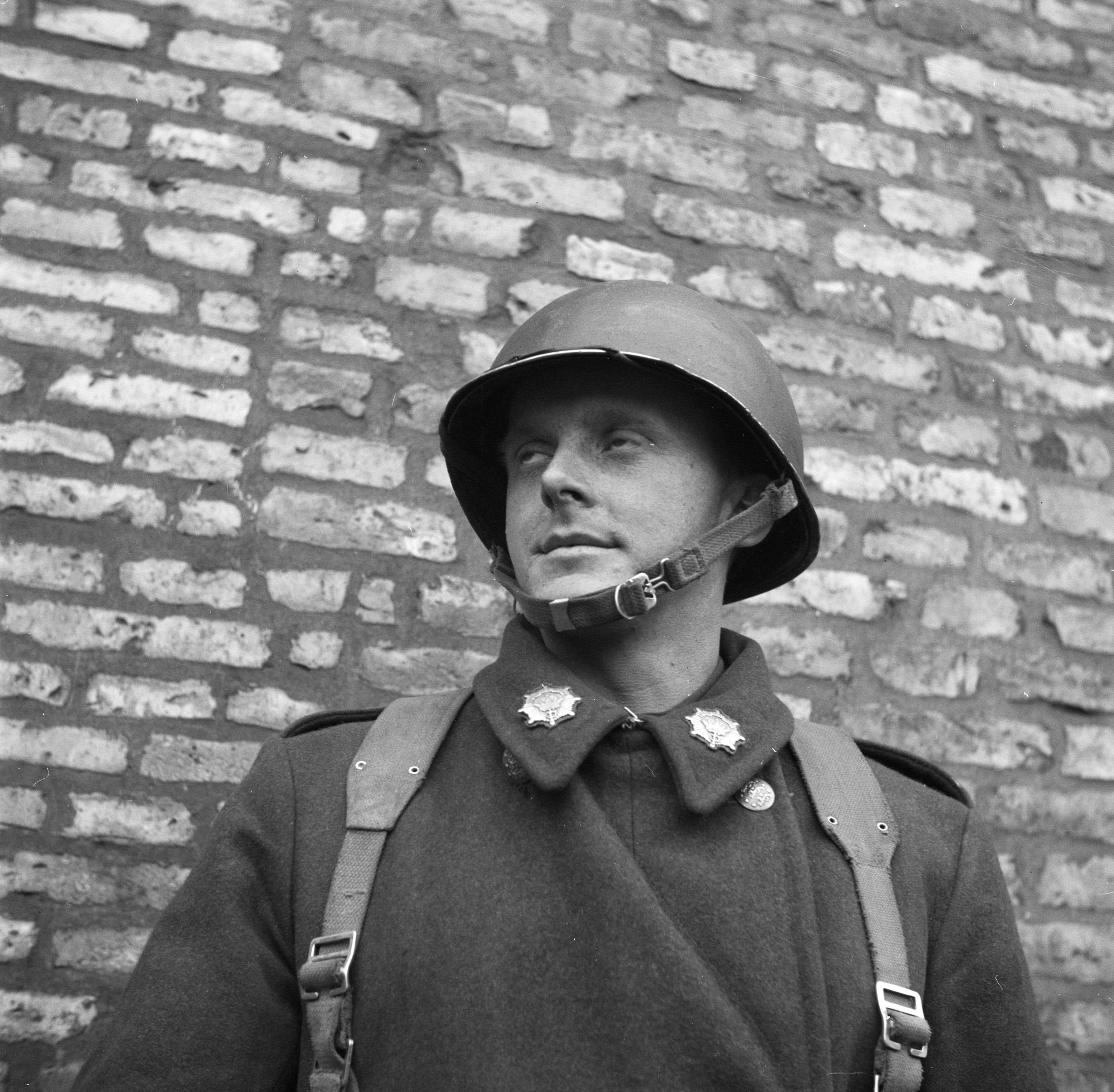
Life Guard in old combat uniform

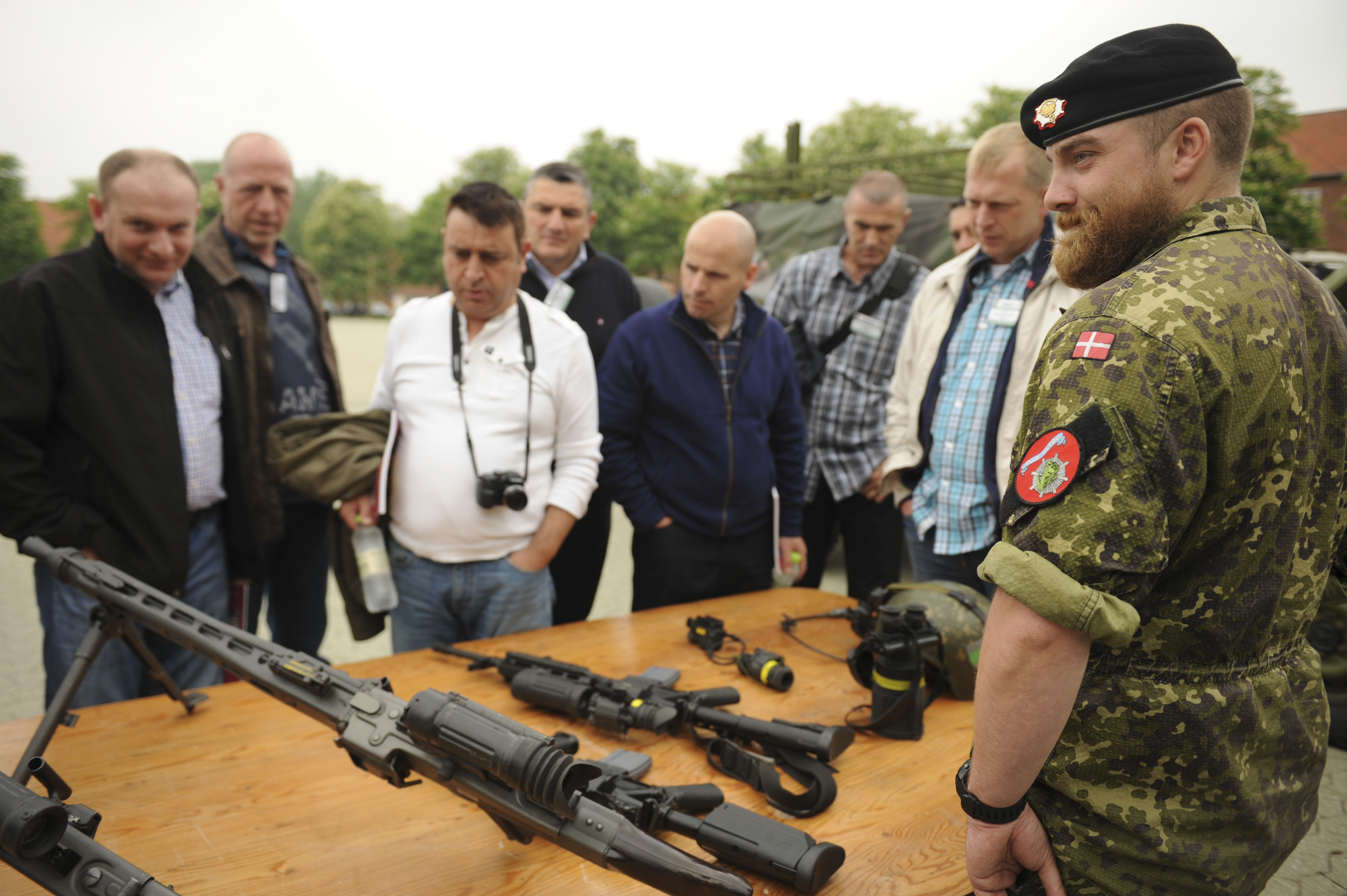
Life Guard in combat uniform (m/01)
staff company/1st battalion.

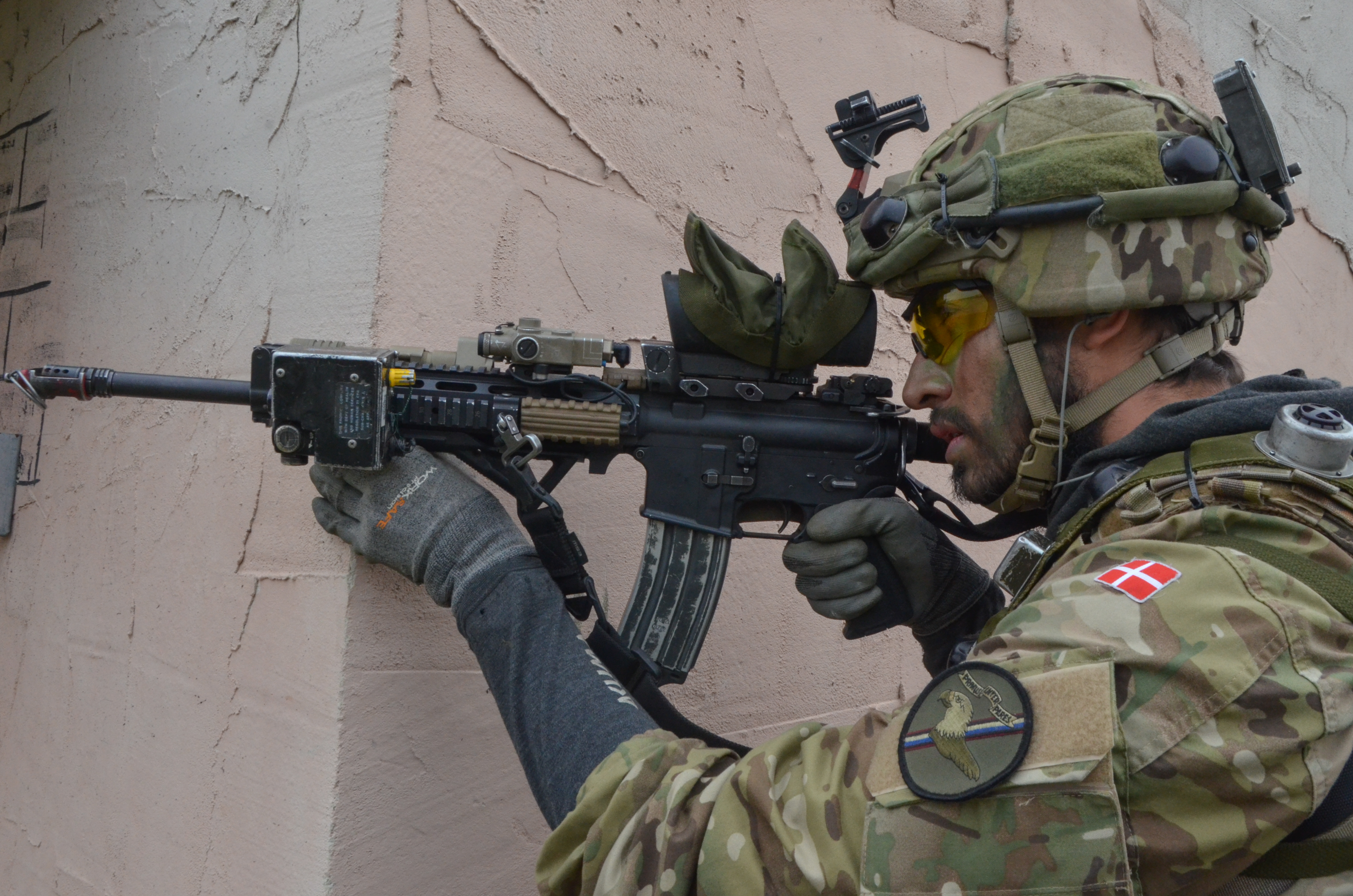
Soldier of 1st Company, 2nd Battalion during Combined Resolve III, Germany, 2014.

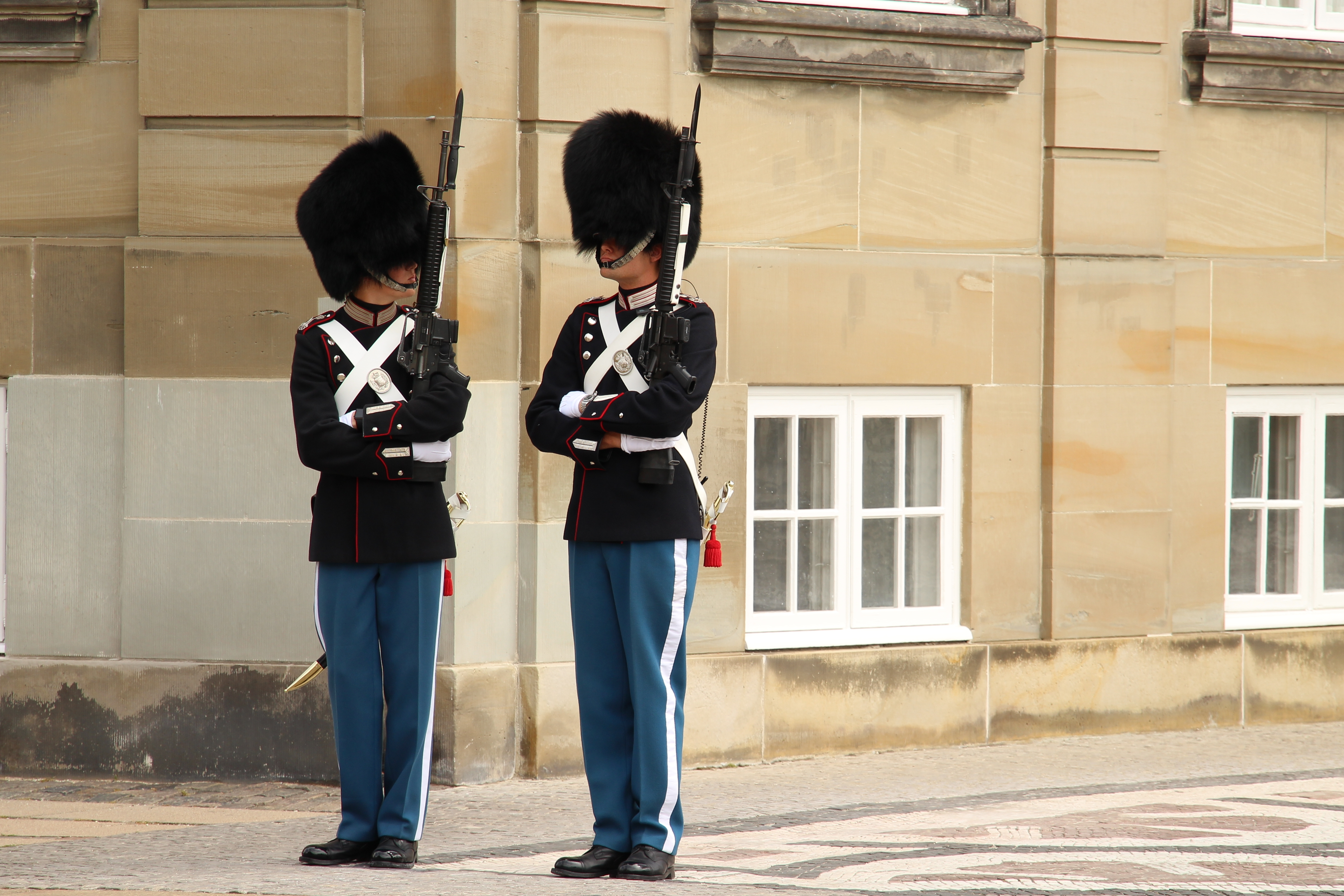
Sentries of the Life Guards at Amalienborg in 2016

== See also ==
- Guard Hussar Regiment (Denmark)
  - Guard Hussar Regiment Mounted Squadron
- Royal Horse Guards (Denmark)
