= Command Support Regiment (Denmark) =

- Føringsstøtteregimentet
- Insignia
- Active: 1951–present
- Country: Kingdom of Denmark
- Branch: (Danish Realm) Royal Danish Army
- Type: Support
- Role: Communication, (two battalions); HQ (two battalion)
- Size: four battalions
- Part of: Army Staff
- Garrison/HQ: Fredericia
- Mottos: Celeriter et secure (Fast and secure)
- Website: Official website

Commanders
- Current commander: Colonel Henrik Graven Nielsen
- Ceremonial chief: HM The King

Insignia
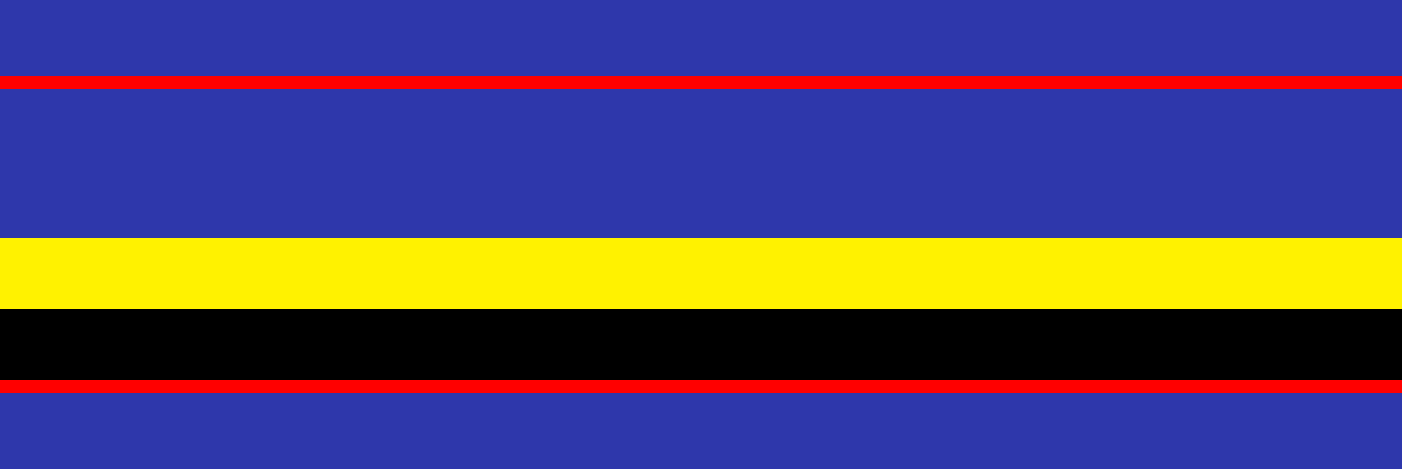
- Regimental belt

- Colours

The Command Support Regiment (Danish: Føringsstøtteregimentet) is a regiment of the Royal Danish Army. It was established in 1951 with the purpose of training and equipping units to support the Danish army with wartime Command, Control and Communications. Until 1 January 2019 the unit was known as Signal Regiment Danish: Telegrafregimentet). Today the battalions filled by the regiment set up the command, control and communications infrastructure of the army by setting up a vehicle-based microwave radio relay network in a mesh topology. The network is designed to be secure, encrypted and difficult to neutralize. Besides the radio network, the regiment also establishes mobile military headquarters to be used by the army.

== History ==
The history of the signal regiment dates back to 1867, when the first Danish signal unit was formed; the 4th Engineering Coy. On January 1, 1914 the company gained status of a battalion in the Engineering Regiment. On November 1, 1947 the Ministry of Defence decided to move the signal battalion from the engineering regiment to serving directly under the Generalkommandoen. The result was the world's first independent signal unit. The signal battalion was later split into two battalions. On November 1, 1951 the two battalions were given regimental status and named Zealandic Signal Regiment and Jutlandic Signal Regiment.

- Zealandic Signal Regiment was attached to LANDZEALAND with:
  - 1st TGBTN(COMLANDZEALAND)
  - 4th TGBTN(BALTAP/COMLANDZEALAND)(1954-
  - EW Coy/east(COMLANDZEALAND) (1953-
- Jutlandic Signal Regiment was attached to LANDJUT with:
  - 2nd TGBTN(COMLANDJUT)
  - 3rd TGBTN(JDIV) (1957-
  - 5th TGBTN(BALTAP/COMLANDJUT) (1961-
  - 6th TGBTN(BALTAP/NATO)(1961-
  - EW Coy/west (JDIV) (1959-

In 1989, as the Cold War drew to a close, Parliament decided to merge the two regiments, garrisoning the resulting unit in Fredericia. This decision was effected on January 1, 1992 and the new regiment was named Signal Regiment.

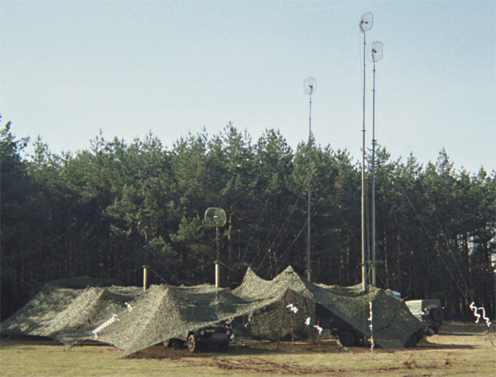
Radio Relay node in 2002

== Structure ==
The regiment is composed of four battalions:

- 1st Command Support Battalion, Command Support Regiment (1. FOSTBTN), in Fredericia
  - Brigade Staff Company
  - Brigade CIS Company (Communications & Information Systems Company)
- 2nd Command Support Battalion, Command Support Regiment (2. FOSTBTN)
  - 1st DCM-E Company (Danish Deployable Communications & Information Systems Module, Echo Company)
  - 2nd CIS Company (Communications & Information Systems Company)
  - 3rd Basic Training Company
- 3rd CIS Operations Support Battalion (3. CISOPSBTN)
  - Implementation
  - Frequency Section
  - Joint Communication
  - CIS Operations Centre
  - Federated Mission Networking
  - Training
- 4th NATO Signal Support Battalion, in Haderslev
- Command Support Battalion, in Ādaži (Latvia) and Fredericia
  - Multinational Staff, in Ādaži
  - Command Support Company (Royal Danish Army), in Fredericia
  - Force Protection Company (Estonian Army)
  - Logistic Support Company (Latvian Army), in Ādaži
- Garrison Support Unit

Disband units:

- The Army Command & Control Support School (Hærens Føringsstøtte Skole)(now part of 3rd Battalion)

== Garrison ==
The regiment is garrisoned in the towns of Fredericia and Haderslev. In Fredericia, the regiment has Ryes Kaserne. Haderslev Kaserne is home to a company from the regiment.

Besides the two bases, the regiment operates Hyby Fælled Proving Ground outside Fredericia. The proving ground is open for the public.

== Names of the regiment ==
Names
Telegrafregimentet	Signal Regiment	1992-01-01	–	2018-12-31
Føringsstøtteregimentet	Joint Signals Regiment	2019-01-01	–

== See also ==
- Signals (military)
- C4ISTAR
