= Guard Hussar Regiment (Denmark) =

- Gardehusarregimentet
- Cap badge of the Guard Hussars
- Active: 17 November 1614 – present (411 years, 11 months)
- Country: Kingdom of Denmark
- Branch: Royal Danish Army
- Type: Mechanized infantry
- Role: Maneuver warfare Raiding; Reconnaissance
- Size: Five battalions
- Part of: Army Staff
- Garrison/HQ: I. & II. Battalion – Antvorskov barracks III.Battalion – Bornholm
- Nickname: GHR
- Motto: In Actis Esto Volucris (Be swift in action)
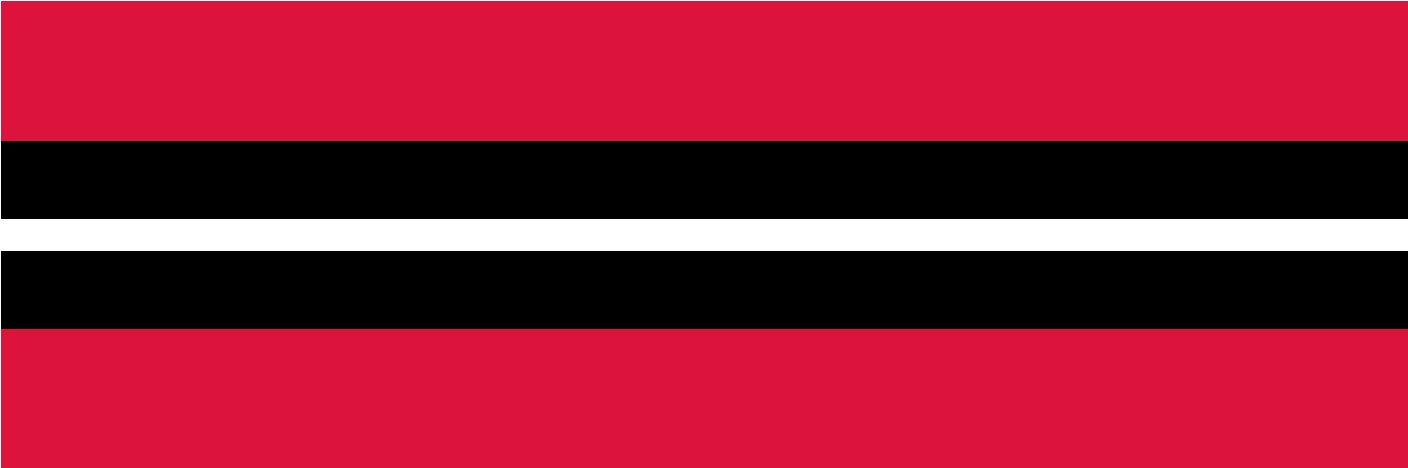
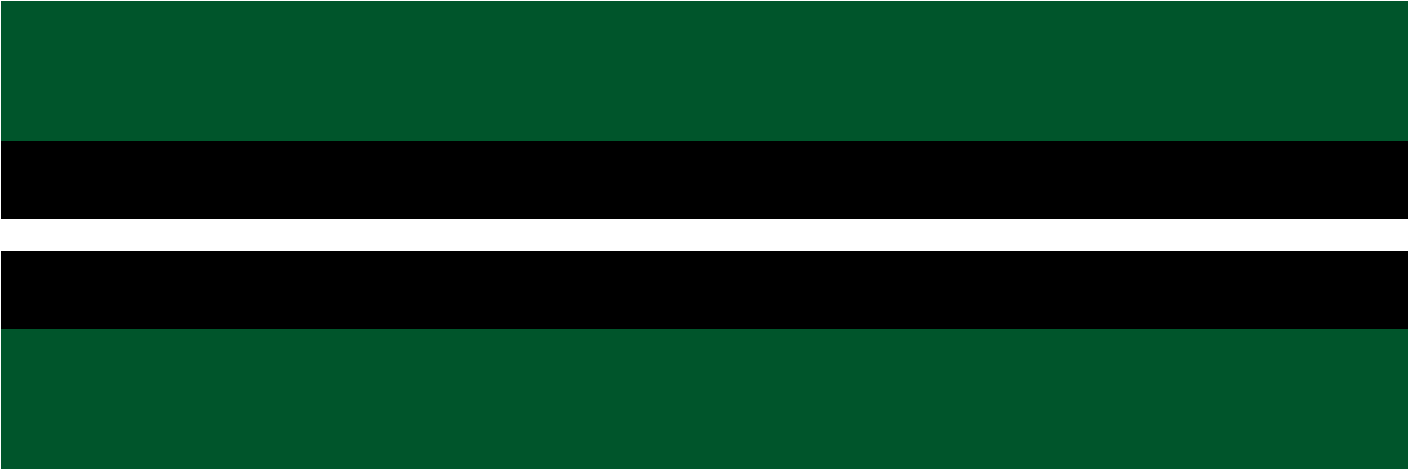
- Regimental belt: (Used by III. Bataljon at Bornholm)
- March: Garderhusarregimentets Signalmarch
- Anniversaries: 17 November 1614; 10 February 1762
- Engagements: Thirty Years War; Torstenson War; Second Nordic War; Scanian War; Nine Years' War; War of the Spanish Succession; Great Nordic War; Napoleonic Wars; First Schleswig War; Second Schleswig War; Operation Weserübung; War in Afghanistan (2001–2021); Iraqi conflict
- Website: www.forsvaret.dk/ghr

Commanders
- Current commander: Colonel Jens Ole Rossen-Jørgensen
- Ceremonial chief: HM The King
- Notable commanders: Peder Aalborg; Caspar Hermann Gottlieb Moltke

Insignia
- Colours

- Standard

- Former coat of arms

The Guard Hussar Regiment (Danish: Gardehusarregimentet, GHR) is a cavalry unit of the Royal Danish Army, whose primary task is to train the Guard Hussars for various functions in the mobilisation force. The Guard Hussar Regiment is one of two active cavalry regiments of the Danish Army, and was formed in 2001 through the amalgamation of the original Guard Hussars regiment, Zealand Life Regiment and Danish Life Regiment.

== History ==
=== Origins of the regiment ===
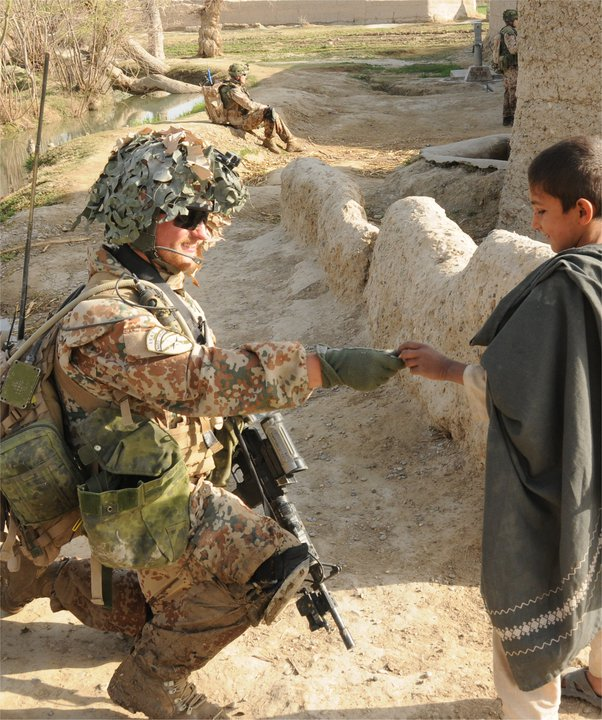
A Guard Hussar soldier interacts with the local population in Helmand, Afghanistan.

Although the Guard Hussars themselves date from 10 February 1762, the Danish Army takes the date of the founding of a regiment from its oldest part, in this case the Zealand Life Regiment, which was founded in 1614. This makes the Guard Hussars one of the oldest regiments of hussars in the world still operational, it is also the only hussars in mounted parade uniform to still wear the slung and braided pelisse which was formerly characteristic of this class of cavalry. In addition to its operational role, the Guard Hussar Regiment is one of two regiments in the Danish Army (along with the Den Kongelige Livgarde) to be classed as 'Guards'; in this case, the Mounted Squadron perform the same role as the Household Cavalry do in the British Army.

From 1961 to 1972 the regiment was responsible for two armoured battalions, one recon battalion. From 1972–2000 the regiment was responsible for one armoured, one mechanised infantry, one reconnaissance and one infantry battalions. From 2000–2004 the regiment was responsible for two armoured, two mechanised infantry, one reconnaissance and two infantry battalions. From 1992–2004 the regiment also had to form two light Reconnaissance Squadrons assigned to the 1st Zealand Brigade and Danish International Brigade.

=== 2001 amalgamation ===
As part of the Defence Agreement 2000–04, it was decided to merge the Guard Hussar Regiment with the Zealand Life Regiment and the Danish Life Regiment. With this amalgamation of the three infantry regiments, the name and history of the new regiment had to be decided. This led to what the media called "the Colonels' War" (Danish: Oberstkrigen), with the three colonels fighting for their regiment's name and history to survive. The Chief of Defence, Christian Hvidt, ordered the old insignia removed, which was not customary. The new armoured horse head was nicknamed the "biker patch". Furthermore, it was decided that a colour be used alongside the standard.

=== Modern times ===
Following the amalgamation, the Guard Hussar Regiment has participated in a number of international missions, resulting in the loss of 16 soldiers.

== Structure ==
=== Current units ===
Today the Gardehusarregiment is classed as a cavalry regiment, it is in fact a mixed armoured and infantry unit, with three battalions:

- Guard Hussar Regiment, in Slagelse
  - I Armoured Infantry Battalion – assigned to 1st Brigade; Motto: Hurtig i tanke og handling, livsfarlig for sine fjender (Quick in thought and action, deadly to his enemies)
    - Staff Company (SLEIPNER) Motto: Altid Klar (Always Ready)
    - 1st Armoured Infantry Company (1/I/GHR or VIDAR) Motto: Når storm lægger sig raser vi stadig (When the storm subsides we rage on)
    - 2nd Mechanised Infantry Company (2/I/GHR or ULTRA) Motto: Non plus ultra (Nothing further beyond)
    - 4th Mechanised Infantry Company (4/I/GHR or FENRIS)
  - V Infantry Battalion – assigned to 2nd Brigade; Motto:Terror in Hostes – Vor fjender til frygt
    - Staff Company (Inactive)
    - 1st Training Company - 11 Month Conscription - Motto:Fremad på ny – hurtig og adræt (Forward again - fast and agile)
    - 2nd Training Company (Livkompagniet) - 11 Month Conscription - Motto:Fremad på ny – lige på og hårdt (Forward again - head on)
    - 4th Mechanised Infantry Company (4/V/GHR) (waiting new assignment)
  - Mounted Squadron – 4 Month Training and 8 months taking care of the regiments horses and public and ceremonial duties

=== Officially disbanded units ===
- II/GHR Armoured Battalion (1955−1976), Infantry Battalion (1977-2000), Armoured Infantry Battalion (2001-2018)
  - Staff company
  - 1st company
- III/GHR Reconnaissance Battalion (1974-2025)
  - Staff Squadron
  - 1st Light Reconnaissance Squadron
  - 2nd Light Reconnaissance Squadron
  - 3rd Light Reconnaissance Squadron
  - 4th Marine Squadron (Marine history is transferred back to Bornholms Regiment)
- IV/GHR Infantry Battalion (1983−1996), Armoured Infantry Battalion (1997-2013)..
- VI/GHR Infantry Battalion (2000-2004).
- VII/GHR Infantry Battalion (2000-2004).

== Names of the regiment ==
Names
Husarregimentet	Hussar Regiment	1762-02-10	–	1780
1. og 2. Husaregiment	1st and 2nd Hussar Regiment	1780	–	1785
1. og 2. Husarkorps	1st and 2nd Hussar Corps	1785	–	1788
Husarregimentet	Hussar Regiment	1788	–	1842
Garderhusardivisionen	Guard Hussar Division	1842	–	1855
Husarregimentet	Hussar Regiment	1855	–	1856
Gardehusarregimentet	Guard Hussar Regiment	1856	–	Present
