= Zealand Life Regiment =

- Sjællandske Livregiment
- Active: 1961–2001
- Country: Kingdom of Denmark
- Branch: Royal Danish Army
- Role: Mechanized infantry
- Garrison: Antvorskov Kaserne
- Motto(s): Tapper og Tro (Valiant and Faithful)
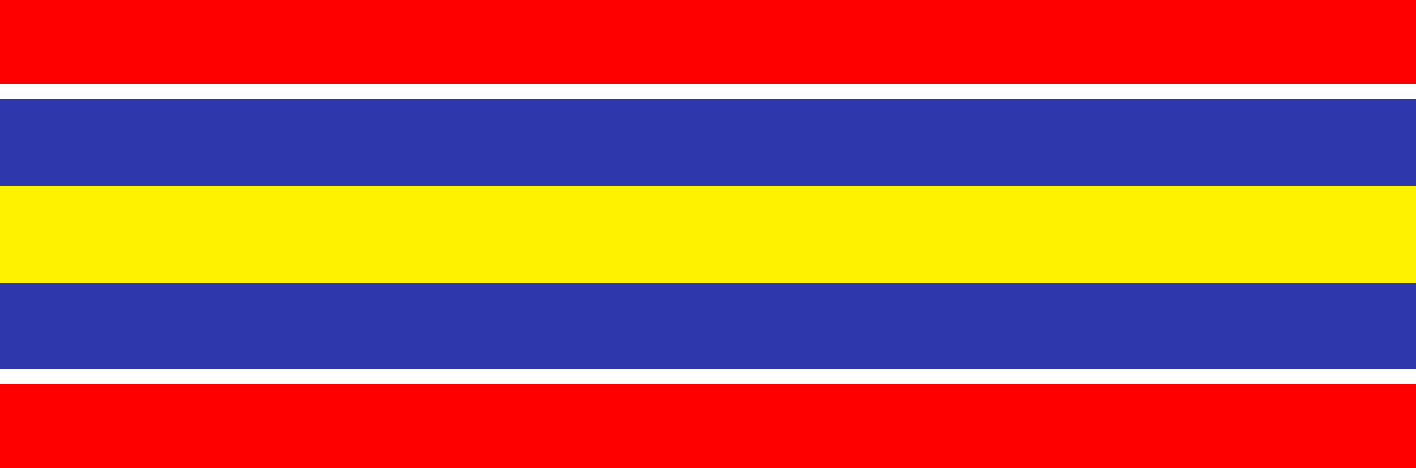
- Regimental belt

The Zealand Life Regiment (Danish: Sjællandske Livregiment) was a Royal Danish Army infantry regiment. On 1 January 2001 it was amalgamated into the Guard Hussar Regiment, which was moved from Næstved to Slagelse.

== History ==
The Sjællandske Livregiment could trace its history back to 1614. The Regiment participated in the Northern Wars (1658–1660), Scanian War (1675–1679), Nine Years' War (1693), Great Northern War (1700), Great Northern War (1709–1720), Copenhagen (1801), First Schleswig War (1848–1850) and Second Schleswig War (1864). It was furthermore in foreign service during 1689–1698 and 1701–1714. The regimental flag had the battle honours Copenhagen 1659, Landskrona 1675, Dybbøl 1849, Isted 1850, and Dybbøl 1864.

From 1968 the regiment had one mechanised infantry battalion and two infantry battalions, in 1976 it was upgraded to four battalions, with one armoured battalion. From 1983 to 1996 the regiment had five battalions.

In 2001, three of the regiment's four battalions were merged into Gardehusarregimentet and the fourth was transferred to the Royal Life Guards.

== Organisation ==
Disband units

- 1st battalion (I/SJLR), Mechanized infantry Battalion from 1968. (1961-2000)
- 2nd battalion (II/SJLR), Armoured Battalion from 1976. (1961-2000)
- 3rd battalion (III/SJLR), Infantry Battalion. (1961-2000)
- 4th battalion (IV/SJLR), Infantry Battalion. (1974-2000)
- 5th battalion (V/SJLR), Infantry Battalion. (1983-1996)
- 4th Brigade Staff Company/1st Zealand Brigade. (1961-2000)
- 4th Anti-tank Company/1st Zealand Brigade. (1961-1983)
- 5th Anti-tank Company/2nd Zealand Brigade. (1974-1983)
- Zealandic Liferegiment Music Corps, (1976-2000)

== Names of the regiment ==
Names
Sjællandske Kompagni af "Skaanske Regiment Knægte"	Zealandic Company of the "Scanian Regiment of Knights"	1614-11-17	–	1628
Sjællandske nationale Regiment	Zealandic National Knight Regiment	1628	–	1661
Sjællandske Landregiment til Fods	Zealandic Land Regiment	1661	–	1679
Sjællandske geworbene Regiment til Fods	Zealandic Regiment	1679	–	1768
Kronprinsens Regiment	The Crown Prince's Regiment	1768	–	1808
Kongens Regiment til Fods	The King's Regiment	1808	–	1839
Kronens Regiment til Fods	The Crown's Regiment on Foot	1839	–	1842
5. Linie-Infanteri-Bataillon	5th Line Infantry Battalion	1842	–	1862
5. Infanteribataillon	5th Infantry Battalion	1862	–	1863
5. Infanteriregiment	5th Infantry Regiment	1863	–	1865
5. Infanteribataillon	5th Infantry Battalion	1865	–	1867
5. Bataljon	5th Battalion	1867	–	1951-11-01
4. Regiment	4th Regiment	1951-11-01	–	1961-11-01
Sjællandske Livregiment	Zealandic Life Regiment	1961-11-01	–	2001-01-01

== Standards ==
Historical standards of the regiment

The Crown Prince's Regiment
(1790–1808)

5th Battalion
(1912–1947)
