= Danish Defence agreement 2005–09 =

The Danish Defence agreement 2005–2009 (Danish: Forsvarsforlig 2005-2009) is a white paper for the military of Denmark, signed on June 10, 2004.

It called for a significant reconstruction of the entire Danish military. At the time, it was about 60% support structure and 40% combat operational capability; it was planned to become 40% support structure and 60% combat operational capability, resulting in more combat soldiers and fewer 'paper'-soldiers. The reaction speed was to be increased, with an entire brigade on standby readiness for global deployment; the military would retain the capability to deploy 2.000 soldiers in international service, or 5.000 for a short time span. The standard mandatory conscription was modified to decrease the number of conscripts as well as the duration of their service time, and to ensure that only those who chose to would continue into the reaction force system.

== Highlights ==
=== Army ===
- Two new brigades were to be created of about 4000 men each—one of very high standby readiness, and one on lower readiness.
- Hærens Basis Uddannelse "HBU" (Army basic training) was to be conducted only in Aalborg, Skive, Holstebro, Fredericia, Varde, Slagelse, Høvelte and Vordingborg barracks.
- Jægerkorpset was to be increased to 135 men.
- Prinsens Livregiment was to move to Holstebro barracks and amalgamate with Jydske Dragonregiment
- The Army’s M270 MLRS rocket artillery was to be disbanded.
- 180 Leopard tanks 1A5DK were to be phased out, along with a number of M113 infantry vehicles.
- Sjælsmark barracks was to be sold and parts of Kongens Artilleriregiment moved to Varde barracks.

=== Airforce ===
- Airbase Værløse was to close.
- The number of F16 fighters on NATO standby was to be reduced from 12+12 to 8+8.
- Four transport helicopters were to be signed up to NATO standby.
- The number of F16 Fighters was to be reduced from 60 to 48.
- The ground–to-air defence DeHAwk was to be disbanded.
- Four additional large transport helicopters were to be acquired (marine versions), along with another Hercules airplane.

=== Navy ===
- One frigate (with helicopter) and one patrol ship were to be signed up to NATO standby.
- Frømandskorpset was to be increased to 90 men.
- Navy basic training was to be moved from Auderød to Frederikshavn.
- A Navy Sergeant school was to be erected in Frederikshavn.
- The navy’s entire submarine capability was to be disbanded, along with four of the fourteen Standard Flex 300 ships and some additional ships.
- Three new ships were to be added.

Preceded by Danish Defence Agreement 2000–04	Danish Defence Agreement; 2005 – 2009	Succeeded by Danish Defence Agreement 2010–14
