= Wolf Henrik von Kalnein =

Danish officer and colonial administrator (died 1690)

- Wulff Heinrich von Calnein

10th Governor of Tranquebar
- In office 9 July 1686 – October 1687
- Monarch: Christian V
- Preceded by: Axel Juel
- Succeeded by: Christian Porck

Personal details
- Born: Prussia
- Died: 27 August 1690 Limerick, Ireland
- Spouse: Maren Charisius (m. 1678; died 1678) Anna Dorothea Munk (m. 1679; died 1689)
- Children: Christian von Kalnein; Frederik von Kalnein
- Parent(s): Caspar von Kalnein; Susanne von Wietmannsdorff

Military service
- Allegiance: Brandenburg–Prussia; France; Dutch Republic; Denmark–Norway 1677–1689; England 1689–1690
- Rank: Oberstleutnant
- Unit: Marine Regiment; Prince Frederick's Battalion
- Battles/wars: Scanian War; Invasion of Rügen; Dano-Mughal War; Williamite War in Ireland; Siege of Limerick

Wolf Henrik von Kalnein (Note: German pronunciation: [vʊlf haɪ̯nʁɪç fɔn kalnəɪ̯n]) (alternative spellings include Heinrich and Calnein; d. 27 August 1690) was a Danish officer and governor of Danish India from 9 July 1686 to October 1687.

Wolf Henrik von Kalnein was born to a Prussian noble family and initially served the Brandenburgian army. Subsequently, von Kalnein served the French, Dutch, and Danish armies, participating in the Scanian War. Followingly, von Kalnein was ordered to investigate the conditions in Danish India, caused by Governor Axel Juel. Arriving in Danish Tranquebar, von Kalnein arrested Axel Juel and greatly improved the conditions in the colony before departing the following year.

From 1688, von Kalnein rejoined the Danish army and received command over a battalion in the Danish Auxiliary Corps, which was sent to fight for William III of England in the Williamite War in Ireland. Von Kalnein died here during the Siege of Limerick in 1690.

== Early service ==
Wolf Henrik von Kalnein was born into a Prussian noble family, being the son of Caspar von Kalnein and Sussane von Wietmannsdorff. In his youth, von Kalnein first served in the Brandenburgian army, then in the French army, and later in Dutch service, where he operated in the V.O.C. in India.

In 1677, during the Scanian War, von Kalnein served the Danish Army, being enlisted in the regiment of Count Lehndorff. The regiment participated in the invasion of Swedish Rügen, and von Kalnein became a major general in the following year. In 1679, he commanded Helsingborg's outwork and became the commander in Korsør after the Peace of Lund. Furthermore, von Kalnein enlisted in the Marine Regiment in 1682 and became Oberstleutnant the next year.

== Governor of Tranquebar ==
On 19 September 1685, von Kalnein got royal instructions to investigate the conduct of the governor of Danish India, Axel Juel, who had been accused of corruption and misdemeaning. On 7 October the same year, von Kalnein departed for India with the ships Flyvende Ulv and Antoinetta, reaching the Danish outpost Tranquebar the following year. Axel Juel willingly handed over his authority to von Kalnein, who took control of the governorate and proceeded with the mandated investigation. Kalnein deemed the accusation against Juel baseless, and Juel was allowed to leave for Madras at his own request.

However, after Juel departed for Madras, von Kalnein re-launched the investigation and quickly changed his mind. Accordingly, von Kalnein condescended to lure Juel back from Madras to Tranquebar by words of friendship. Once back in Tranquebar, Juel was immediately imprisoned and brought before a court. Subsequently, Juel was found guilty on 14 January 1687, and was ordered to be taken to Denmark.

=== Internal reforms ===
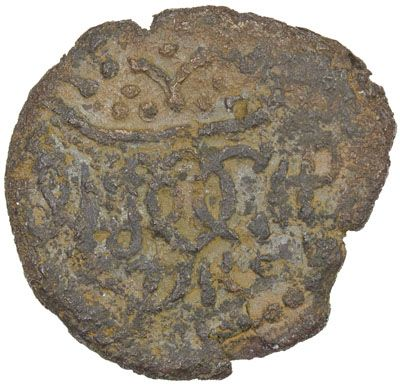
Coin from Tranquebar during the reign of Christian V (r.1670–1699), showing the initials WHVK for Governor Wolf Henrik von Kalnein

Before von Kalnein transported Juel back to Denmark, he worked energetically to improve the conditions in Tranquebar and managed to accomplish a great deal during his tenure. He was later held by the company's subsequent commanders as an example of diligence and care for the company's welfare. Although he imposed taxes on trade in tobacco, he succeeded in maintaining good relations with the inhabitants of Tranquebar. So much so that inhabitants requested that King Christian V get Kalnein back, after his departure in 1687. In a couple of royal letters, von Kalnein is praised highly and seen as having great respect for the residents. Additionally, he revived the slave trade, where he at one point earned 12,000 Danish rigsdaler on a single voyage to Achin.

It can also be assumed that von Kalnein may have been the originator of a reform in the internal coin system, which may have taken place in 1686. Many of the coins from Tranquebar during the reign of Christian V bear the initials K or WHVK, which is an abbreviation for Kalnein and Wolf Henrik von Kalnein, respectively. Even after von Kalnein had returned home, the coins still bore his initials, providing solid evidence that he had a significant influence on the colony. The coins were further standardized to weigh 4.6 grams (0.16 oz).

=== Foreign policy ===
The economic development of Tranquebar was positively influenced by the Danish neutrality in the period of the Nine Years' War. Despite the neutrality, an English warship, commanded by Thomas Batten, dropped anchor off Tranquebar on 7 October 1687, charged with the task of arresting English serfs who had entered the service with a Greek adventurer, Constantine Phaulkon, at that time in the service of the King of Siam. Batten's attitude was not diplomatic, and he threatened to launch a military operation against the Danes if they did not act according to his intention. Grounding the argument on the Danish neutrality, Governor Calnein called it interfering in internal affairs and had Batten arrested and interned. Despite Batten soon being released, von Kalnein demonstrated a strong defense of the nation's neutrality. Furthermore, von Kalnein re-declared war on the Mughal Empire, which had been in conflict with the Danes since 1642. He managed to seize several Bengali vessels, including four larger ships. A couple of the prizes served the Company in India for many years, including two named Dansborg and Elefanten.

=== Return voyage ===
On 11 October 1687, von Kalnein initiated his return to Denmark with a squadron of seven ships, including ships captured from the Bengalis. To this, von Kalnein declared: "I sailed out with two ships but returned with a squadron of seven." Von Kalnein was furthermore chief on Flyvende Ulv, and arrived at the Cape of Good Hope on 8 January 1688. Here, he had a serious dispute with the captain of Antoinetta, Jørgen Bjørn, and publicly reviled Bjørn in front of the crew. On 27 January, the fleet left the Cape of Good Hope and subsequently arrived in Ascension Island. Here, von Kalnein ordered that Bjørn come aboard Flyvende Ulv, possibly to arrest him. However, Bjørn refused, and von Kalnein responded by sending two armed vessels to Antoinetta, in which the armed men were eventually driven back by the crew on Antoinetta. The ship council on Antoinetta subsequently decided to separate from the rest of the fleet and go directly to Copenhagen, as a result of the threat to Bjørn.

The rest of the fleet landed at Kinsale on 20 July 1688, when Flyvende Ulv lost its wheel during a storm. Meanwhile, von Kalnein had fallen overboard and had his left arm dislocated. Later, a couple of Danish frigates came to Kinsale and escorted him back to Denmark.

== Later life ==
In Copenhagen, von Kalnein had brought back the now-imprisoned Axel Juel, and a long trial would proceed, only ending with a Supreme Court ruling after von Kalnein's death. Despite this, von Kalnein managed to get much recognition from King Christian V and the D.E.I.C.

Concurrently, von Kalnein re-entered the Danish military in 1688 as Oberst and received command over Prince Frederick's Battalion in the Danish Auxiliary Corps in the Williamite War in Ireland the following year. Here, von Kalnein would die in 1690 during the Siege of Limerick.

== Personal life ==
Von Kalnein married Maren Charisius in c. 1678; however, she died the same year. Von Kalnein remarried on 12 February 1679 to Anna Dorothea Munk, and had two sons together, Christian and Frederick. Anna Dorothea Munk died in 1689, while von Kalnein was in Ireland.

Wolf Henrik von Kalnein is furthermore noted for bringing the Von Kalnein family to Denmark–Norway.

== See also ==
- Johann Dietrich von Haxthausen – Major-general and Danish commander
- Moritz Hartmann (officer) – 1657–1695 Danish naval officer and governor of Danish India
- Lave Hohendorff – 1662–1729 Danish general officer

== Works cited ==
- Schule, Georg Christian (1787). Lexicon over Adelige Familier i Danmark, Norge og Hertugdommene (PDF) (in Danish). Copenhagen: Kongelige Danske Genealogiske og heraldiske Selvskab. p. 99.
- Molbech, Christian (1848). Kong Christian den Femtes egenhændige Dagbøger for Aarene 1689, 1690, 1691 og 1696 (PDF) (in Danish). Copenhagen: Historisk Tidsskrift. p. 63.
- Larsen, Kay (1940). Guvernører, Residenter, Kommandanter og Chefer (PDF) (in Danish). Copenhagen: Arthur Jensens Forlag. p. 56.
- Bastrup, C. (1919). Danmarks Søfart og Søhandel [Danish Shipping and Maritime Trade] (PDF) (in Danish). Copenhagen: Nyt Nordisk Forlag.
- Thiset, Anders (1905). Danmarks Adels Aarbog 1905 (PDF) (in Danish). Copenhagen: Vilhelm Trydes Boghandel. p. 313.
- Krarup, Frederik (1894). Museum: tidsskrift for historie og geografi. 1894,1 (in Danish). Bavarian State Library.
- Abrahamson, Per Olov (2000). Danska Ostindien Vad är det? (PDF) (in Swedish). Föreningen Íslandssamlarna. p. 14.
- Wanner, Michael (2012). "Tranquebar – Economic, Culture and Power Centre of Danish India 1620-1845". Prague Papers on the History of International Relations. Prague: Institute of World History.
- Döhring, Ekkehard; Sturm, Gabriele (2021). Dänisches Kolonialgeld: Tranquebar – Indien (in German). Deutschen Numismatischen Gesellschaft. ISBN 978-3-447-04123-2.
- Diller, Stephan (1999). Die Dänen in Indien, Südostasien und China (1620-1845) (in German). Otto Harrassowitz Verlag. ISBN 978-3-447-04123-2.
- Schlegel, Johann Heinrich (1776). Samlung zur dänischen Geschichte, Münzkenntniss, Ökonomie und Sprache (in German). Gedruckt bey H. C. Sander und J. F. Morthorst.
