= Lave (disambiguation) =

Lave was an ironclad floating battery of the French Navy during the 19th century.

Lave may also refer to:

== People ==
- Jean Lave, American anthropologist
- Kitione Lave, Tongan boxer
- Lave Cross (1866–1927), American third baseman in Major League Baseball
- Lave Hohendorff – 1662–1729 Danish general officer
- Lave Knud Broch – Danish politician
- Lave Winham (1881–1951), American pitcher in Major League Baseball
- Lester Lave – American environmental economist
- Silke Lave Glud – Danish ice hockey player (born 1996)

== Other ==
- Lave language – Austroasiatic language spoken in Cambodia and Laos
- Lave net, used to catch salmon in river estuaries
