= Danish Auxiliary Corps in the Williamite War in Ireland =

Danish Auxiliary Corps in Ireland
- Royal Monogram of King Christian V of Denmark-Norway
- Active: 1689–1692
- Country: (Denmark–Norway) Denmark
- Allegiance: William of Orange and Mary II of England
- Type: Foot and Horse
- Size: 6,000 foot and 1,000 horse
- Part of: General-in-chief Frederick Schomberg's Army
- Engagements: Battle of the Boyne; Battle of Aughrim; Siege of Limerick (1690); Siege of Cork; Siege of Kinsale; Siege of Athlone; Siege of Galway

Commanders
- Notable commanders: Ferdinand Willem, Duke of Württemberg-Neuenstadt

The Danish Auxiliary Corps was a corps of 7,000 Danish soldiers sent to fight with William of Orange who was at war in Ireland. Disappointed with his alliance with France's King Louis XIV, Christian V of Denmark–Norway in 1689 entered into a treaty of military assistance with King William III of England. The corps was transported to Ireland, fighting against the Jacobites, participating in the battles of the Boyne and Aughrim, as well as the sieges of Limerick, Cork, Kinsale, Athlone, and Galway. In early 1692 the corps was transported to Flanders for future service in English pay.

== Background ==
Through the treaties of Brømsebro and Roskilde, Denmark–Norway had lost one third of its kingdom to Sweden. Then having been unable to acquire territorial gains in the revanchist Scanian War 1675–1679, Denmark instead sought territorial compensation by repossessing the territory of the Duke of Holstein-Gottorp that it had taken during the war, but was forced to return it as a consequence of the treaty of Fontainbleu. Thwarted again by the intervention of Imperial, Brandenburg, Saxon, Dutch, and English diplomats, backed up by threats of war from Sweden and Lüneburg, the Danish were forced to yet again return the disputed lands through the Treaty of Altona in 1689. Needing to rebuild its army, facing an empty treasury, and chagrined by the lack of French support during its recent predicaments, Denmark moved away from its alliance with Louis XIV, welcoming William III of England's approaches and entered into a treaty of military assistance with England.

== Treaty (1689) ==
Denmark-Norway and England concluded a treaty of military assistance on 15 August 1689. The treaty stipulated that Denmark-Norway would send 1,000 horse, and 6,000 foot, with equipment, to England, Scotland, or Ireland. The Danish troops would take an oath of allegiance to the King of England. If Denmark became involved in a war, the troops would be returned within three months; Denmark's enemy would become England's. The use of the troops was solely decided by the English King, but they would be kept together as a corps except in dire emergencies. The troops would be subordinated to the English general-in-chief; the Danish lieutenant-general and major-generals forming part of his council of war. Military justice would be provided by the Danish lieutenant-general in accordance with the Danish articles of war. Vacancies in the officer corps would be filled by the English general-in-chief from persons serving in the Danish troops. While serving in Britain, the troops would be paid the same pay as the English army; if transferred to the continent, the same pay as the Dutch army.

== England (1689–90) ==
In accordance with the treaty, a Danish Auxiliary Corps of 996 horse and 6,109 foot, under the command of Ferdinand Willem, Duke of Württemberg-Neuenstadt, was sent abroad in 1689. The corps gathered in Ribe in mid-October and marched to Jordsand where the foot embarked on ships, while the horse embarked at Højer. A fleet of 80 ships escorted by six man-of-war set sail in November in order to cross the North Sea. But autumnal storms scattered the ships widely. Schoutbynacht Christopher Ernst von Støcken managed to gather 60 of them and take refuge in the German Bight. One ship with four companies from the Oldenburg Regiment was taken by a French privateer, however, and brought to Brest; the men being forced into French service as the regiment Royal Danois. The officers refused to serve the French king and were kept imprisoned under poor conditions for a long time before they were released.

Most other ships eventually ended up on the east coast of England and Scotland. They arrived at Kingston upon Hull and other ports in November, and were ordered to be taken by ship to Scotland; the horses not in condition were to be sent by ship to march by land to Chester. The men were sick after the sea transport and those who landed could not march for want of money to pay their quarters. The Danish corps therefore spent the winter of 1689–1690 in quarters in York, Durham, Newcastle upon Tyne, and Berwick-upon-Tweed. In December, they were ordered to proceed to Chester, but the corps could not leave York unless the officers and soldiers were paid so they could pay their debts. The officers had been spending their own money for two months, and were very unhappy that the English had not fulfilled their promises. In January, the Danish foot marched toward Chester where they had to be paid. Not more than £34,000 had been paid in Yorkshire, the King having footed the bill for the winter quarters. An additional £25,000 was needed in Chester, and a further £13,000 in advance before their arrival in the distant quarters appointed for them in Ireland.

== Ireland ==
=== 1690 ===
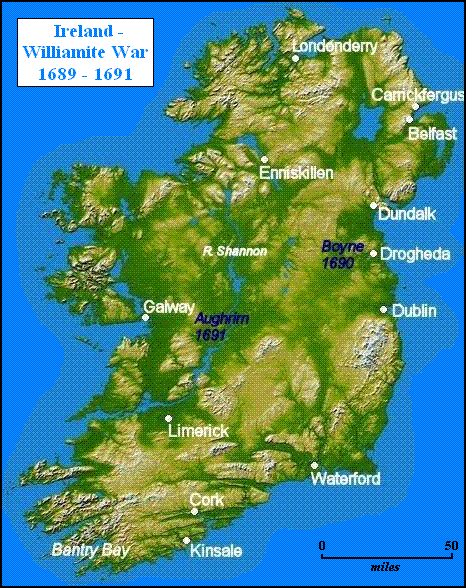
Ireland during the Williamite War.

In February 1690, the Danish corps marched to Liverpool, and in March they were shipped to Belfast. Active operations did not commence until June, however, when King William arrived with the rest of his army. At the Battle of the Boyne, the Jacobite forces held the south side of the River Boyne, in order to prevent the Williamite army from crossing the river from the north near Oldbridge. North of the river, King William on 1 July ordered his right wing to proceed upstream and cross the river, in order to envelop the Jacobite army. Afraid of being outflanked, King James sent a large force from the main army upstream to strengthen his left wing. The Jacobite left wing, now containing the bulk of the Jacobite army, met the Williamite right wing at Roughgrange, but a deep ravine prevented the opposing forces from engaging in a general battle. This left only an inadequate Jacobite force facing the main Williamite army, which crossed the river at Oldbridge under heavy fire. When the Williamite cavalry crossed the river farther downstream, the Jacobite army began to retreat. The Danish foot participated with seven battalions in the crossing at Oldbridge, while the Danish horse took part in the cavalry crossing farther downstream. Altogether the Danish corps suffered 28 killed and 43 wounded; the majority among the horse.

Although the Williamite army failed to take the city, the Danish corps played a leading role during the Siege of Limerick. On 7 August 100 Danish horse from Sehested's Regiment led the advance on the city together with 50 dragoons, followed by a brigade of fusiliers under Sir Henry Belayse. The vanguard was formed by the Danish foot forming a brigade, after which the main army followed. Reaching Ireton's fort, the Danish brigade deployed to the left, and Sir John Hanmore's to the right. The Danish attack was spearheaded by 50 pioneers under Lieutenant Weldau of the Danish Guards, followed by 240 grenadiers of the same regiment, and then the rest of the Danish foot. During the heavy fighting, the Jacobites were forced to abandon the fort, which was taken by two Danish battalions. On 16 August, the Irish made a sortie against the camp of the left wing of the Williamite army, but they were easily beaten back by the pickets of the Danish Guards.

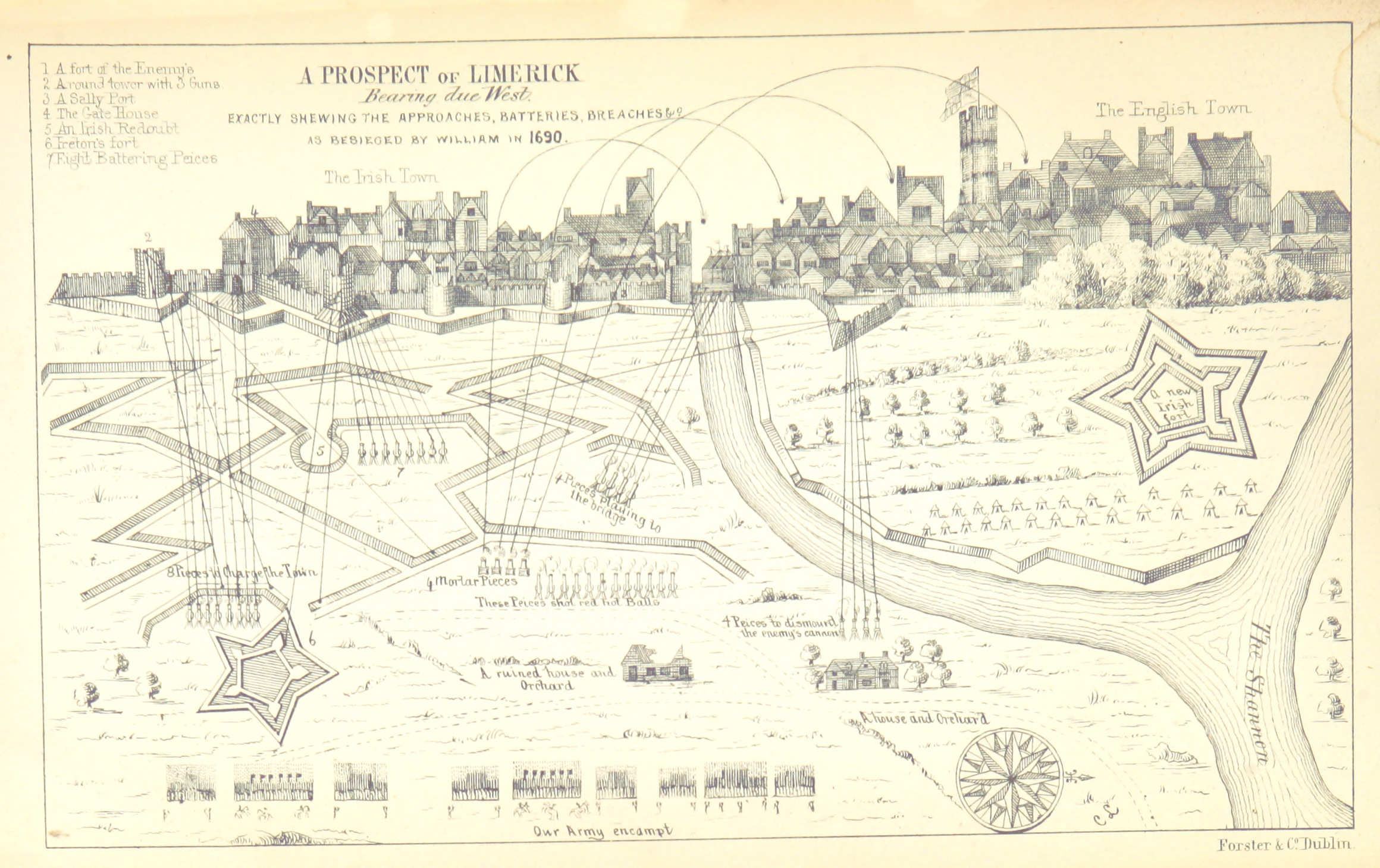
Siege of Limerick 1690.

The Williamite trenches on the south side of Limerick were opened on 17 August by the Duke of Würtemberg with seven battalions, among which were the Danish Guards and the Jutland Battalion. Captain Arenswald with the grenadiers of the Danish Guard took a redoubt on the left wing, while one on the right was taken by the Dutch Blue Guards. Next morning the Jacobites made a sally with four battalions on the right wing of the Williamite army and drove away the pioneers and their supports, but a counterattack by a Danish and a Dutch battalion drove them back. The same day the trenches were held by Douglas and seven battalions, of which were found the Queen's and Funen. A redoubt in front of the Williamites were attacked, but during the attack, which took place after dark, the Jacobites made a counterattack with cavalry and the Williamites were driven back. The two Danish battalions lost 13 killed, 24 wounded, and 4 prisoners.

On 27 August, the Williamite siege artillery had made a serious breach in the walls of the "Irish town" section of the city. The assault began at 2:30 under Douglas with the seven battalions that were in the trenches, of which were the Queen's and Funen, while the trenches would be repossessed by Würtemberg and seven fresh battalions, of which were Prince Frederick's and Prince Christian's. The attack was led by nine grenadier companies and one hundred French reformados, supported on the left by the Funen Battalion and a Brandenburg battalion, and on the right by two English battalions. At first, the Jacobites were driven back, but they were able to drive the attackers back again. The Funen Battalion was cut off, but was saved by Prince Frederick's Battalion. The fighting lasted until dark, when King William finally called off the assault. The Danish losses were 136 killed, among them Colonel Kalneyn, and 305 wounded.

After the aborted siege of Limerick, King William left Ireland in September, leaving the Williamite army under command of the Dutch Count of Solms, who placed it in winter quarters. The Danish corps was assigned quarters in the counties Tipperary, Cork, Waterford, and Wexford. Active operations were far from over, however. Major-General de la Forest-Suzannet was sent toward Killmallock with 400 horse, 200 dragoons, and 500 foot. When the Williamite force arrived, the town was abandoned by its defenders, leaving the baggage for the Danes. Major-General Tettau was ordered to search the town, but finding it not worthwhile to occupy decided to remove its defences. Major-general von Tettau and the Dutch Major-General Scravenmoer, with 1,200 Danish and Dutch horse, and Prince George's and the Zealand battalions of foot, took and held some defiles between Cork and Limerick in order to prevent communications between the two places. On 13 September the troops met and defeated Jacobite forces, mostly Rapparees, under Colonel Sheldon.

Marlborough landed near Cork on 22 September, and began to besiege the city. The Duke of Würtemberg marched to Cork with 340 horse, 50 dragoons, and 2,900 foot, of which 1,600 belonged to the Danish corps, and took up a position on the northern side, immediately outside the city walls. Under the command of Major-general von Tettau, the troops forced its way into the burning northern liberties, driving the Jacobite defenders away from their outworks and back into the city. The attack on the city began on 27 September, when a force of 100 grenadiers and 400 foot, of which 300 Danish, under Lieutenant-colonel Munchgaard, in the afternoon crossed the River Lee and continued until they were stopped by a moat in front of the walls. The main assault from the south followed, and soon the defenders surrendered.

After Cork, Würtemberg's and Marlborough's combined forces continued to Kinsale where they arrived on 2 October. In the afternoon, Major-general von Tettau with 200 grenadier and 600 fusiliers set out to take James's Fort. The fort being on a point in the harbour, the troops crossed the bight at night, taking cover in the dark outside the fort. In the morning, the defenders seeing no enemies withdrew from the outworks into the fort itself. Tettau then began the assault, the defenders returning to the outworks, and heavy fighting began. After a short fight, the Jacobites were forced back into the fort. Tettau and his men attacked again, and when an accidental explosion in the gunpowder magazine killed a large number of the defenders, the commandant surrendered. The Danish troops had 24 casualties, while the other attacking Williamites suffered 31. After a siege that lasted until 17 October, the city finally capitulated.

=== 1691 ===
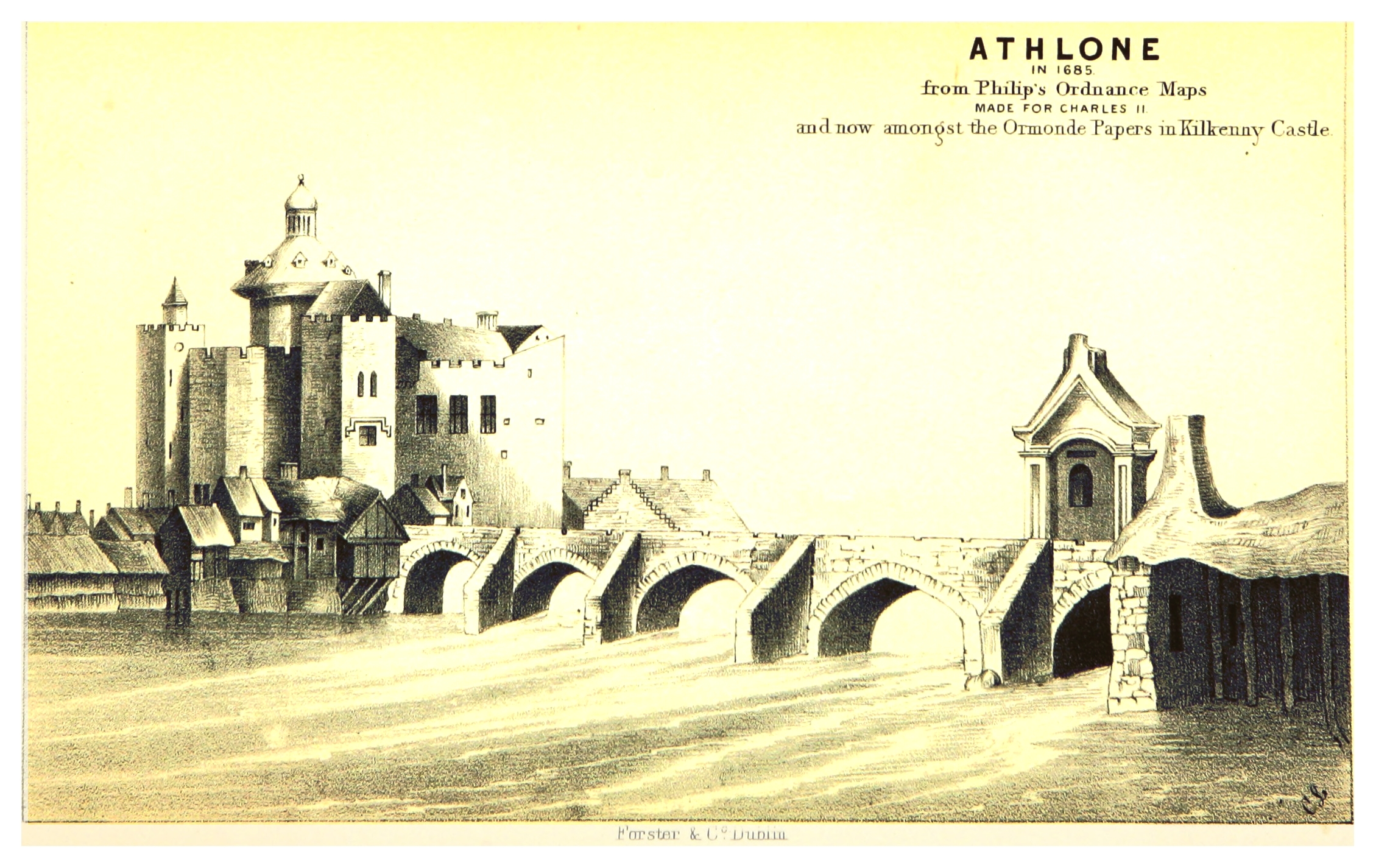
Athlone in 1685.

The Williamite army left their winter quarters and assembled in May. The Danish corps formed part of the Duke of Würtemberg's wing containing 14 battalions of foot, of which six were Danish, and seven regiments of horse, of which three were Danish. Two Danish battalions were temporarily left at Waterford and Clonmel. Würtemberg's wing joined the main army under Dutch General Godert de Ginkel at Ballymore, and the campaign began on 6 June, when the town was taken. The army reached Athlone on 18 June, and the famous siege began the next day. The "English Town", part of the town, east of the River Shannon, was taken on 20 June. The Jacobite defenders then retreated to the "Irish Town" section on the other side of the river, and destroyed the bridge crossing the river. The Williamite artillery bombarded the Irish Town, and soon damaged the castle and made a large breach in the wall at the western bridgehead. The gap in the bridge was repaired on 29 June by the Irish, but was immediately destroyed again by the Williamites. The next day, an assault column of 600 grenadiers, under Tettau and Mackay, supported by six battalions crossed the river upstream, took the western ramparts, and held them until the main Williamite force came up. Realizing the precariousness of their position, the Jacobites abandoned the town. During the Siege of Athlone the Danish troops lost about one hundred killed and wounded.

After taking Athlone, the Williamite army on 11 July began moving towards the main Jacobite army under the Marquis de St Ruth at Aughrim. The next day the decisive battle of Aughrim took place. The Jacobite army held the Kilcommadan ridge on a two miles long front. Walls turned into breastworks ran along the front, below which there was a bog. The right wing of the Williamite army attacked the Jacobite positions by the village, but was beaten back. The Williamite foot attacked across the bog, managed to reach the ridge but again the Williamites were driven back, but were saved from their pursuers by the Danish horse. The left wing under the Duke of Würtemberg containing the Danish foot, two regiments of horse, and one of dragoons, advanced slowly towards the Jacobite right wing. The Danish Guard distinguished itself; when attacked by four Jacobite battalions it not only held its position but forced the attackers back. Würtemberg's two regiments of horse charged, the Danish foot advanced, and the Jacobite right wing was dislodged from its position. St Ruth was killed, the Jacobite army fell into disarray, and the Williamite horse on the right wing penetrated the Jacobite positions around Aughrim, charging along a causeway over the bog. Soon the Jacobites retreated in confusion, although darkness prevented the Williamites from conducting regular pursuit. Colonel Munchgaard of the Danish corps was killed in action.

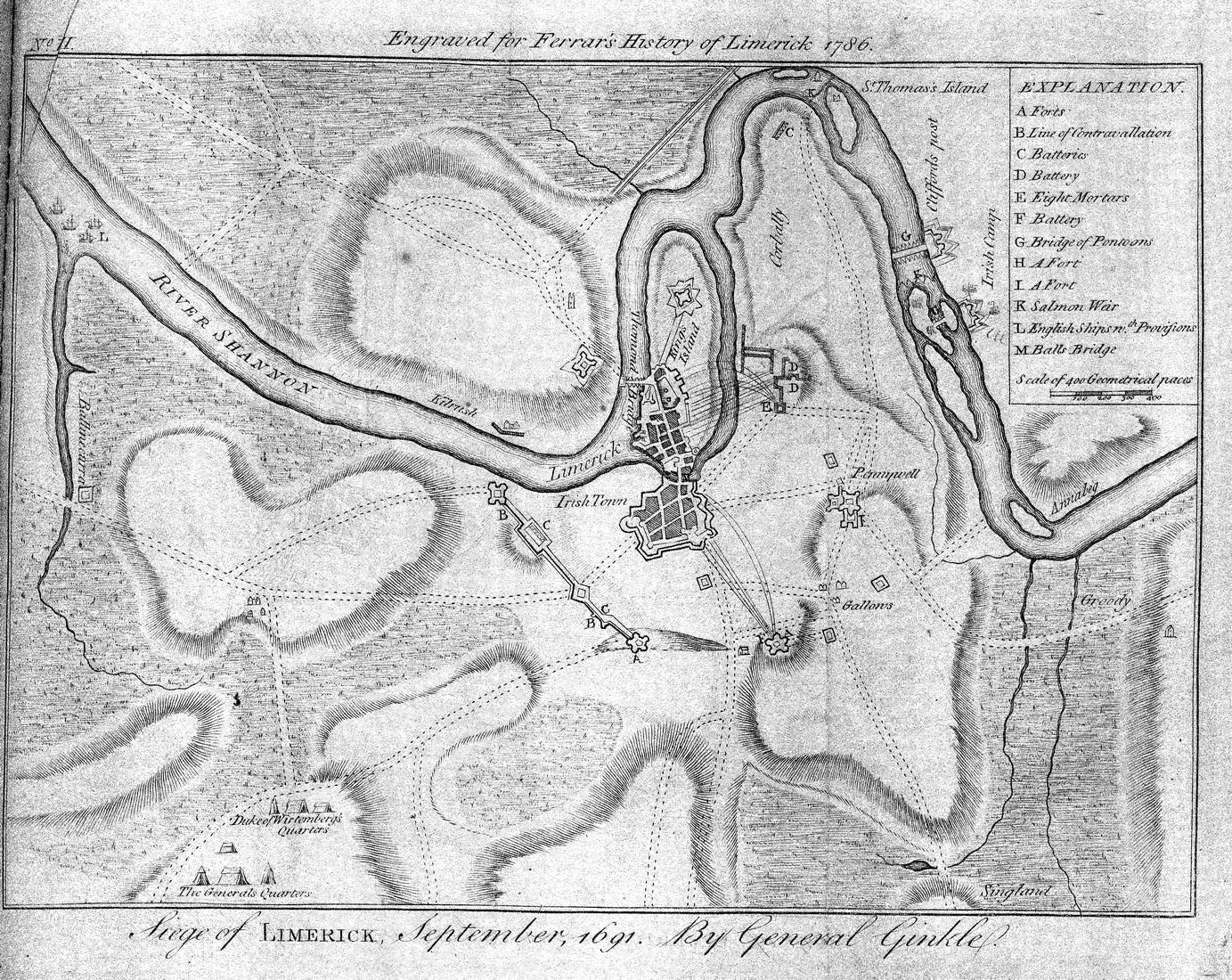
Siege of Limerick 1691.

The campaign continued. Galway capitulated on 25 July after a brief siege. The outworks were taken on 20 July, by grenadiers and foot supported by the Danish Guards and an English battalion. When relief forces were beaten back, the town surrendered and the main Williamite army began its march toward Limerick. The second siege would be more successful for the Williamites, than the first a year earlier. The besiegers began to dig trenches on 27 August, and on 3 September the siege batteries opened fire. The artillery fire made a great deal of damage to the city defences, but the high water made an assault difficult. A large force under the Duke of Würtemberg therefore crossed the Shannon on pontoons on 22 September, drove away the Jacobite cavalry outside the city and advanced towards it from the west. The garrison of a fort on the west side of the river were driven towards the Thomond Bridge, but the defenders closed the gate and let the fleeing troops perish under the walls. During the fighting the Danish suffered 23 killed and wounded. A period of ceasefire began on 23 September, and the city surrendered on 3 October.

After Limerick, the Danish corps and most other foreign troops were ordered to Flanders. The Corps left the city on 14 October and went into quarters until the transportation to the continent could be organized; the Danish horse stayed in Clonmel, Cashel, and Carrick; the Danish foot in Waterford, Youghal, Cork, and Kinsale.

== Order of Battle ==
Lieutenant-general and commander of the corps was Ferdinand Willem, Duke of Württemberg-Neuenstadt; Major-general of Horse was Marquess Frédéric Henri de La Forest de Suzannet; Major-general of Foot was Ernst von Tettau. Each regiment of horse had two squadrons of three companies. The Guards battalion had seven companies; the battalions from Prince George's and Oldenburg regiments each five companies; the other battalions six companies.

=== Units and commanders ===
Units Commanders	Mother regiments
Juel-Rysensteen's Regiment of Horse; Colonel Baron Christian Juel af Rysensteen	Drafts from: Sjællandske Nationale Rytterregiment; Fynske Nationale Rytterregiment; 1. Jyske Nationale Rytterregiment; 2. Jyske Nationale Rytterregiment
Donop's Regiment of Horse; Colonel Moritz Melchior v. Donop. KIA during the siege of Limerick 1691.	Drafts from: Sjællandske Nationale Rytterregiment; Fynske Nationale Rytterregiment; 1. Jyske Nationale Rytterregiment; 2. Jyske Nationale Rytterregiment
Sehested's Regiment of Horse; Colonel Jens Maltesen v. Sehested	Drafts from: Sjællandske Nationale Rytterregiment; Fynske Nationale Rytterregiment; 1. Jyske Nationale Rytterregiment; 2. Jyske Nationale Rytterregiment
Danish Guards Battalion; Lieutenant-General The Duke of Württemberg-Neuenstadt; Lieutenant-Colonel Lave Hohendorff, 1692	Garden
Queen's Battalion; Colonel Baron Johann Dietrich von Haxthausen	Dronningens Regiment
Prince Frederick's Battalion; Colonel Wolf Henrik von Kalnein. KIA at Limerick 1690. Colonel v. Munchgaard, 1690. KIA at the Battle of Aughrim 1691.	Prins Frederiks Regiment
Prince George's Battalion; Brigadier Johan Anton v. Elnberger; Colonel Otto v. Vittinghof, 1690; Lieutenant-Colonel Siewert v. Oertzen, Acting 1691; Count Frederik Ahlefeldt-Langeland	Prins Georgs Regiment
Prince Christian's Battalion; Lieutenant-Colonel Siewert v. Oertzen; Brigadier Johan Anton v. Elnberger, 1690	Prins Kristians Regiment
Zealand Battalion; Major-General Ernst v. TettauRecalled to Brandenburg 1691. Major-General Hartvig Asche v. Schack, 1691	Sjællandske Regiment
Funen Battalion; Lieutenant-Colonel Hans Didrik v. Schorr	Fynske Regiment
Jutland Battalion; Lieutenant-Colonel Hans Hartmann v. Erffa	Jyske Regiment
Oldenburg Battalion; Four companies taken by the French at sea; the remaining two companies merged with the Queen's Battalion, and the battalion was disbanded before entering into active service. Colonel Otto v. Vittinghof	Oldenburgske Regiment

=== Strength ===
Strength when departing Denmark in 1689

Unit	Heads	Horses
General staff	21	104
Each regiment of horse	337	446
Danish Guards Battalion	804	52
Queen's, Prince Frederick's, Prince Christian's, and Zealand battalions, each	687	46
Prince George's Battalion	573	37
Jutland and Funen battalions, each	687	42
Oldenburg Battalion	573	40

Strength 6 November 1690

Date	Horse	Foot
At the beginning of the campaign in 1690	996	5,600
6 November 1690	890	4,649
Casualties	106	951

Strength 8 April 1691

Unit	Efficient strength	Of which sick
Juel-Rysensteen's Regiment of Horse	295	2
Donop's Regiment of Horse	286	7
Sehested's Regiment of Horse	289	5
Danish Guards	745	13
Queen's	534	58
Prince Frederick's	506	12
Prince Christian's	530	51
Prince George's	524	21
Zealand	543	26
Jutland	502	30
Funen	425	15

Strength 6 November 1691

Unit	Efficient strength	Of which sick
Juel-Rysensteen's Regiment of Horse	n.a.	n.a.
Donop's Regiment of Horse	n.a.	n.a.
Sehested's Regiment of Horse	n.a.	n.a.
Danish Guards	712	73
Queen's	544	104
Prince Frederick's	483	51
Prince Christian's	486	85
Prince George's	491	74
Zealand	506	81
Jutland	472	104
Funen	388	15

=== Winter quarters ===
Winter quarters winter of 1690/1691:

Units	Winter quarters
Headquarters	Waterford
Danish Guards; Prince Frederick's	Waterford; Duncannon
Zealand; Prince George's	Youghal
Queen's; Prince Christian's	Clonmel
Jutland	Carrick; Dungarvan
Funen; Sehested's Horse	Wexford
Juel-Rysensteen's Horse	Enniscorthy
Donop's Horse	Blackwater

== See also ==
- Danish Auxiliary Corps in Anglo-Dutch service 1701–1714
- Danish Auxiliary Corps in Habsburg service 1701–1709
