= Axel Juel =

Danish captain and colonial administrator (1655–1720)

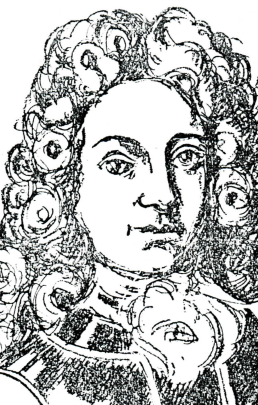
- Portrait of Axel Juel, from Lone Fallentin's Axel Juel på Fruegaarden

9th Governor of Tranquebar
- In office 8 October 1681 – 9 July 1686
- Monarch: Christian V
- Preceded by: Sivert Adeler
- Succeeded by: Wolf Henrik von Kalnein

Personal details
- Born: 7 July 1655 Nørre Vosborg, Denmark–Norway
- Died: 20 January 1720 Strammelse, Denmark–Norway
- Resting place: Landet Church, Tåsinge, Denmark
- Spouse: Sophie Amalie Parsberg
- Children: N.N. Axelsdatter Juel; Christian Axelsen Juel; Niels Axelsen Juel
- Parent(s): Claus Eriksen Juel; Sophie Gyldenstierne

Military service
- Allegiance: Denmark–Norway 1671–1687
- Rank: Captain
- Battles/wars: Blockade of Porto Novo

Axel Clausen Juel (Note: Danish: [ɑgsəl klɑʊ̯sən ju:l]) (alternatively spelled Aksel and Juul; 7 July 1655 – 20 January 1720) was a Danish captain and governor of Danish India from 8 October 1681 to 9 July 1686.

Axel Juel was born in Nørre Vosborg, Denmark–Norway, on 7 July 1655, to Lieutenant Colonel Claus Eriksen Juel and Sophie Gyldenstierne. He was the nephew of Niels Juel and Jens Juel, both of whom served as directors of the Danish East India Company.

Axel Juel was accepted into the service of the Dano-Norwegian navy in 1671 and was appointed captain in 1679. It is presumed that Juel was on board the Oldenburg during its voyage to the East Indies from 1672 to 1675. Juel was appointed commander of the Danish Fort Dansborg on 27 September 1681 and became governor of Tranquebar in October of the same year. Juel became increasingly unpopular during his governorship due to his corrupt and tyrannical attributes. Eventually, the Danish East India Company got word of the conditions in the colony and sent Wolf Henrik von Kalnein to investigate Juel's rule. Subsequently, Juel was arrested and sent to Denmark in January 1687, where a major lawsuit concluded that he was to pay 3,000 rigsdaler for his actions.

Juel would spend the rest of his life residing in an estate in Strammelse on Tåsinge, marrying Sophie Amalie Parsberg. Juel died on 20 January 1720 and was buried under Landet Church.

== Early life and service in the Dano-Norwegian Navy ==
Axel Juel was born near Ulfborg, Denmark–Norway, in the manor house Nørre Vosborg. He was the son of Lieutenant Colonel Claus Eriksen Juel and Sophie Henriksdatter Gyldenstierne, and nephew of Admiral Niels Juel and diplomat Jens Juel. Axel Juel was accepted into the service of the Dano-Norwegian navy in 1671 and was trained at sea.

Juel had a difficult time acquiring knowledge, and there is little uncertainty that his relation to Niels Juel secured and furthered his career. During the Scanian War, Juel was appointed captain and would be chief of the Svenske Falk in August 1679 and Christianus Quintus in November the same year. Concurrently, he would receive the title of orlogskaptajn (war captain) and would be on board the warship Mercurius in 1680. However, Juel was dismissed from the navy shortly after the Peace of Lund.

Axel Juel is typically identified with "Junker Juel", who was on board the East Indiaman, Oldenburg, during its voyage to the East Indies between 1672 and 1675. Before returning home, some of the crew from Oldenburg were invited to a big farewell audience with the Sultan of Bantam, including Juel. Both Juel's uncles, Niels Juel and Jens Juel, were directors in the Danish East India Company.

== Governor of Tranquebar ==
On 8 October 1681, Juel was appointed governor of Danish India and arrived at the Danish colony of Tranquebar the following year at the age of 27. Juel's appointment caused resentment among many of the colonial officials, and he was quickly viewed as unpopular. He was described as tyrannical, brutal, and very self-conscious. In connection with a party, Juel ordered his assistant, Anders Steffensen, to hold a wine glass forward between two fingers, so Juel could demonstrate his shooting proficiency by shooting the glass away with his pistol; Juel shattered the glass, but also Steffensen's two fingers. Furthermore, Juel ordered 27 cannon shots to be fired whenever he entered Tranquebar, which is normally considered a king's salute (Kongesalut).

At the same time, Tranquebar was in a financially bad period as a result of the lack of cargoes from Denmark. Subsequently, Juel fired many of the Company's officers and imposed torturous taxes on the local Indian population. Rather than prioritizing the Danish Company's interests, Juel instead engaged in private trade. Additionally, he did not answer Royal letters from Denmark and did not keep any accounts nor share economic transactions with the second-in-command, Johan Gillis. The local government in Bengal began to restrict Danish trade in the area, which possibly caused the grounding of the vessel Christianshavn. Shortly after, the Dutch conquered Bantam and banished all Danish merchants there. The Danes were also banished from Balasore, Masulipatnam, and Porto Novo, despite Juel winning a war against the latter.

=== Planned mutiny ===
The worsening economy resulted in Juel reducing the wages by 50% for several of the 1,700 company employees on 29 July 1684. The bad conditions were gradually turning towards mutiny. One evening, Johan Gillis gathered several men and confronted them about their duty to guard the Danish company against failures and losses. Subsequently, 12 men planned to rebel at night on 23 September 1684. However, when one of the conspirators, Claus Høeg, gave the signal to start the mutiny, the other men did not dare to join. As a result of this, Høeg got so annoyed that he told Juel about the incident. They were subsequently captured, convicted, and two of them were executed. Another died during treatment in prison, while four were sentenced to have their ears cut off, be whipped, and stigmatized. Following this, they were deported to the Malabar Coast so that they would never come back. However, with the help of local Indians, they managed to reach a Dutch trading post. From here, they sent complaints to Copenhagen, and this forced Niels Juel and Jens Juel to leave their positions in the D.E.I.C..

As a result of the complaints, two warships were sent from Copenhagen in 1685, with Oberstleutnant Wolf Henrik von Kalnein to investigate the conditions. Surprisingly, Juel gave himself over willingly and even showed von Kalnein around. Juel asked von Kalnein for permission to go to Madras before returning to Denmark, which he was permitted to do. Meanwhile, von Kalnein investigated the cases for the conspirators and decided that Juel should be arrested. Juel was lured back from Madras to Tranquebar and was immediately arrested thereafter. A larger lawsuit against Juel was initiated, where some of the previous conspirators were used as witnesses. Juel was convicted of embezzlement for the value of 65,025 Danish rigsdaler, had his fortune confiscated, and was sent back to Denmark in January 1687.

== Lawsuit and later life ==
Juel came to Denmark as a prisoner, but was released from custody with the support of Niels Juel. However, the original verdict, along with new complaints from von Kalnein and others, made the legal proceedings continue. The D.E.I.C.'s directorate and a special commission were appointed to address the matter. Juel was legally represented by Reinhold Wordeman, while Calnein's counsel was Brostrup Albertin. Concludingly, the Company awarded Calnein for his actions, while Axel Juel still received 18,000 Danish rigsdaler for confiscated property. The case stirred significant public interest, with mistreated assistants and heirs of deceased individuals coming forward.

The credibility of the original Indian trial was questioned due to alleged coercion, lack of proper documentation, and reliance on invalid testimony. In 1690, the commission's judgment largely favored Juel, nullifying the verdict from Tranquebar, while dismissing his compensation claim against von Kalnein. However, the case concerning criminal matters was not settled and went to the Supreme Court in October 1690, with interest from the Danish King and the public. The prosecutor against Juel argued how a person belonging to the nobility could behave as cruelly as Juel, and one of the charges was that Juel allegedly once said:

Yes, winemakers and scoundrels now rule in Denmark, and the old Danish nobility is displaced, and the citizens of Copenhagen would also be nobility, but that doesn't suit them well.

— Axel Juel

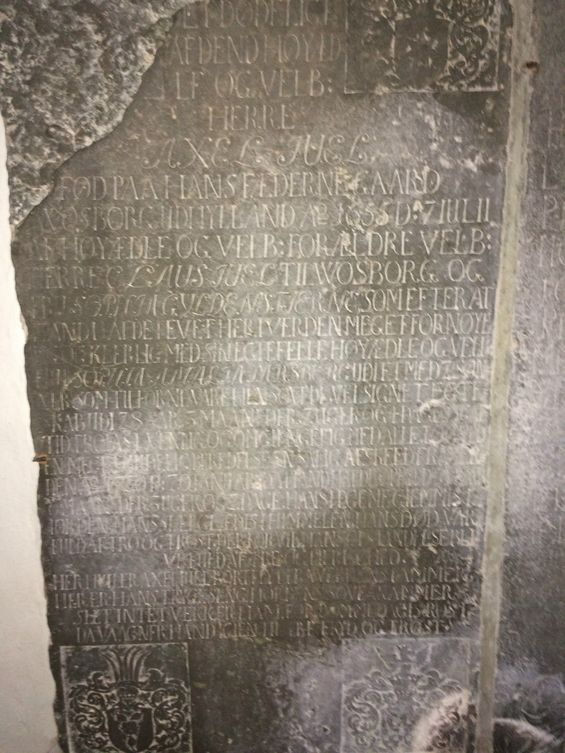
Axel Juel's tombstone, located in Landet Church

This statement made him very unpopular, yet there was not sufficient evidence for him ever saying this, as the witnesses were among those being executed in Tranquebar. Still, Juel faced the death penalty; however, influential people, including Niels Juel, exerted their influence in favour of Axel Juel in the court ruling. Finally, the two major cases against Juel were decided on 23 December 1690. The Supreme Court acquitted him of most charges, and the sentence thereafter was a compensation amounting to 2,000 rigsdaler to the people Juel had mutilated, as well as 1,000 rigsdaler to a church in Christianshavn.

=== Farm in Strammelse ===
The lawsuit made Juel impoverished, yet he had acquired a residence in Strammelse on the Danish island of Tåsinge from his uncle in 1678. Here, Juel would reside with his wife, Sophie Amalie Parsberg, whom he married on 2 October 1692. The farm in Strammelse was a small manor farm compared to the farms in the neighborhood, yet Juel would still have several people employed at his farm. Juel and Parsberg's children would all die as infants, leaving Juel with no descendants. Juel would die on 20 January 1720, and he would be buried under the floor of Landet Church near the ascent to the pulpit. A large tombstone was placed over him, which is still visible today.

The western wall of the chancel in the same church features a painted epitaph to Axel Juel. An épée, believed to have belonged to Juel, is also mounted on the wall of the church. In 1722, Juel's widow presented a collection bag to the church with items associated with Juel. This included a silver bell featuring Juel and Parsberg's initials and coat of arms, which is now in the collection of Svendborg Museum.

== Gallery ==
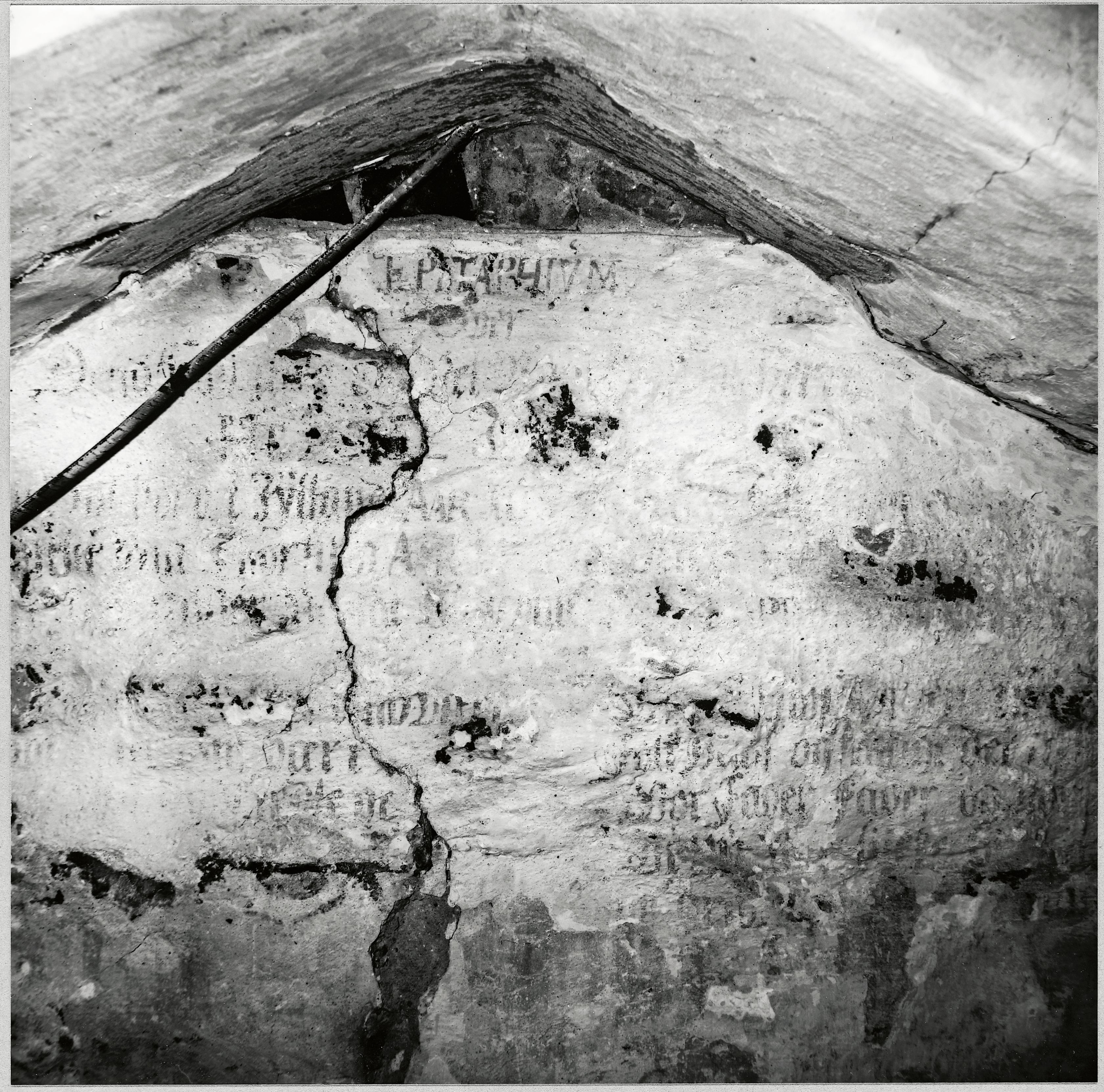
Epitaph to Axel Juel painted on the west wall of the chancel in Landet Church

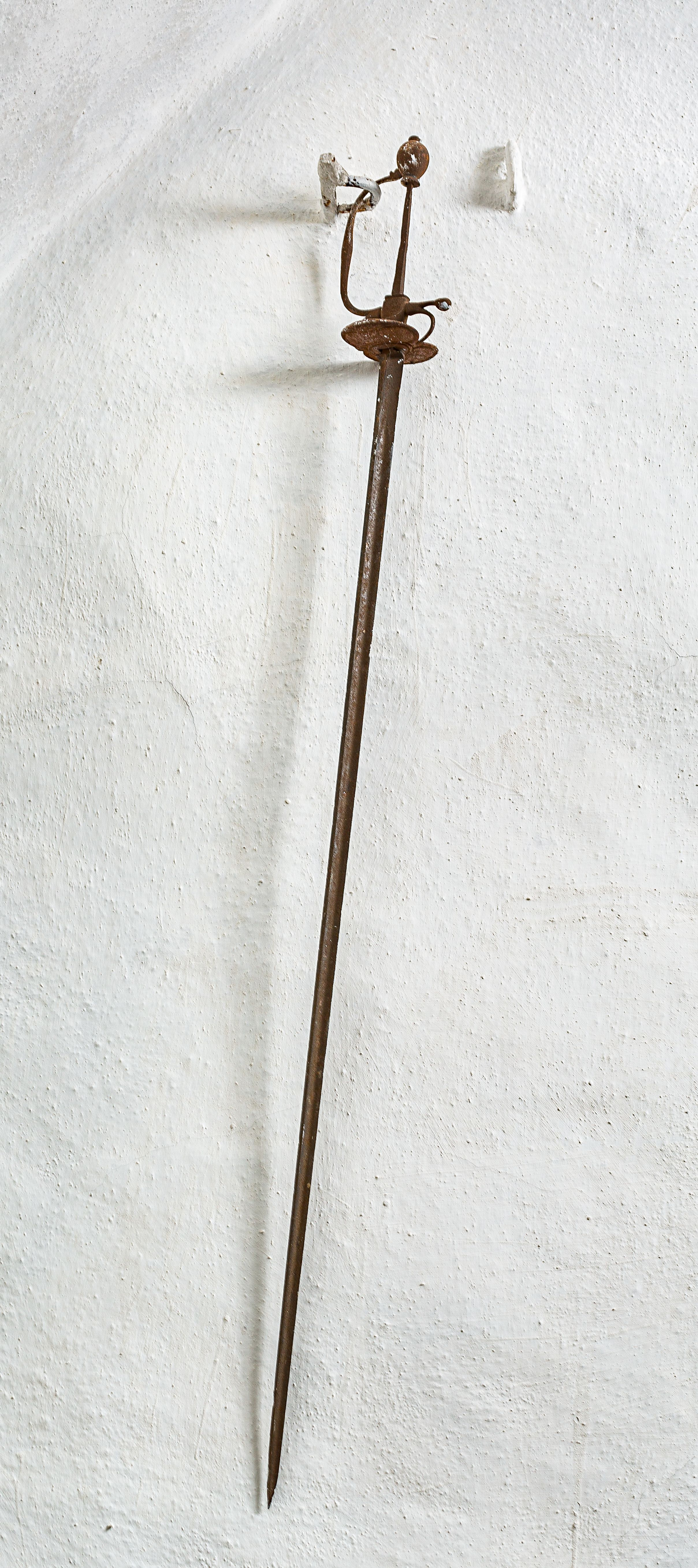
The épée, believed to have belonged to Axel Juel, hung on the wall in Landet Church

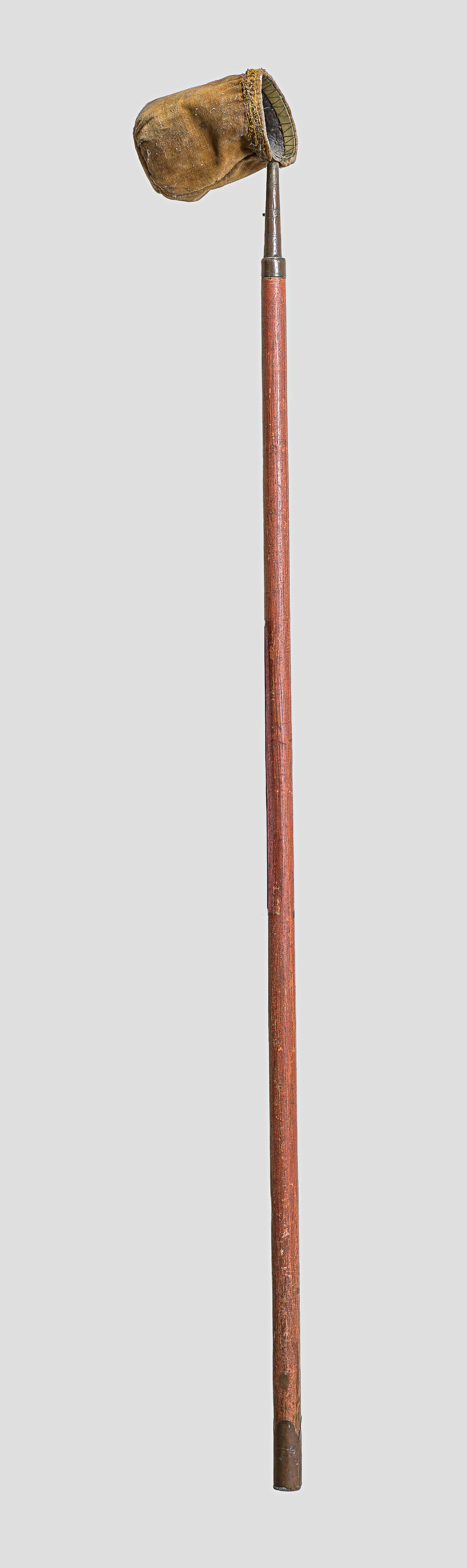
Collection bag presented to Landet Church by Juel's widow in 1722

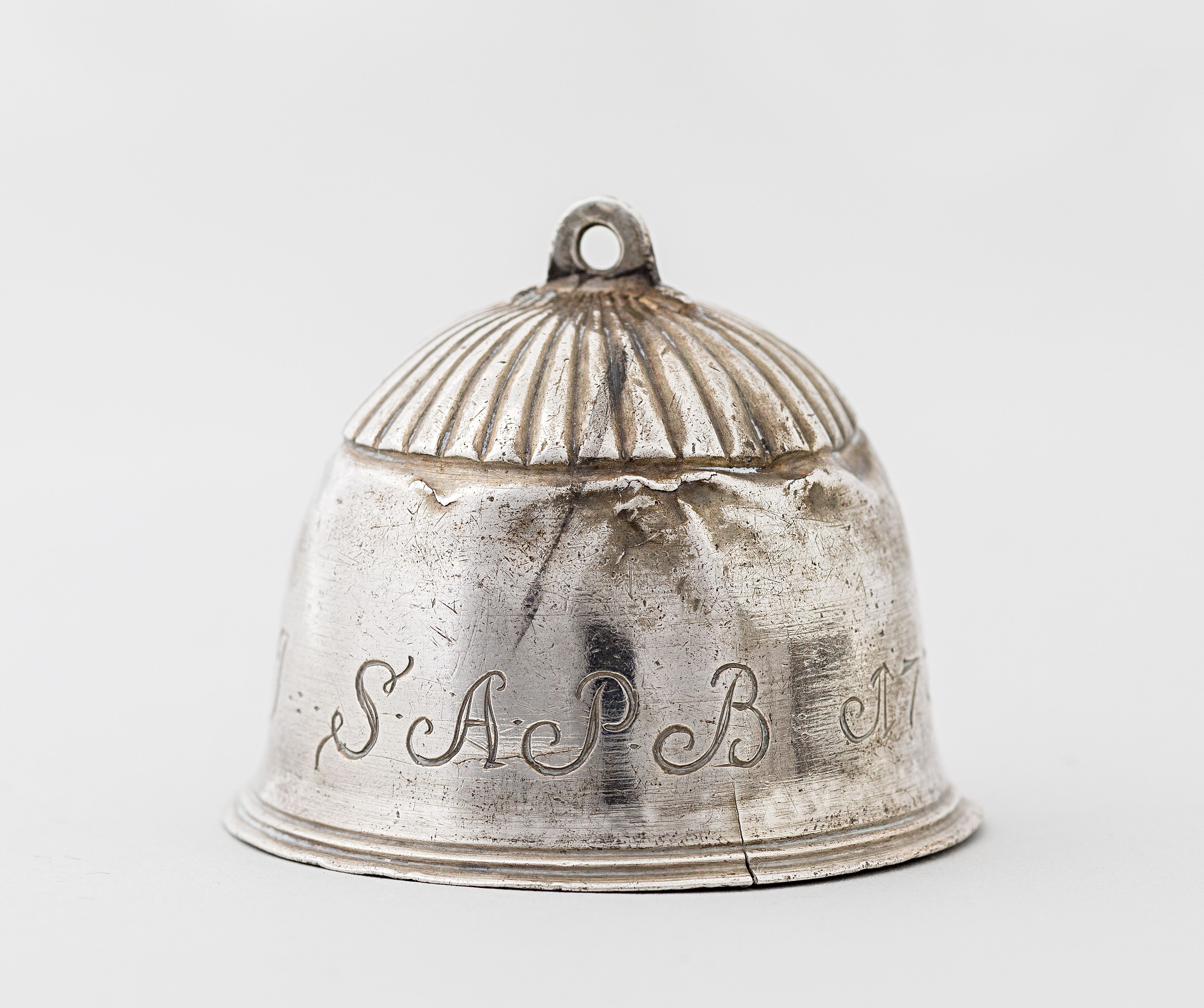
Bell from the collection bag presented to Landet Church by Juel's widow in 1722

== See also ==
- Niels Juel – Danish naval officer (1629–1697)
- Moritz Hartmann (officer) – 1657–1695 Danish naval officer and governor of Danish India
- Jens Juel (diplomat) – Danish diplomat (1631–1700)
- Bernt Pessart – 17th-century Danish governor and president of Danish India from 1636–1643

== Notes and references ==
=== Works cited ===
- Bastrup, C. (1919). Danmarks Søfart og Søhandel [Danish Shipping and Maritime Trade] (in Danish). Copenhagen: Nyt Nordisk Forlag.
- Bricka, Carl Frederik (1887). Dansk biografisk lexikon [Danish biographic lexicon] (in Danish). Gyldendal. p. 559.
- Bruun, Carl; Hovgaard, Andreas Peter; Rist, Peter Frederik (1894). Museum: Tidsskrift for Historie og Geografi (in Danish). Gyldendal.
- Fallentin, Lone (2014). Axel Juel på Fregaarden [Axel Juel on the Fruegaarden] (PDF) (in Danish). Tåsinge årbog.
- Krarup, Frederik (1894). Museum: tidsskrift for historie og geografi. 1894,1 (in Danish). Bavarian State Library.
- Larsen, Kay (1940). Guvernører, Residenter, Kommandanter og Chefer (PDF) (in Danish). Copenhagen: Arthur Jensens Forlag. p. 61.
- Paul, Sue (1 April 2020). Jeopardy of Every Wind: The biography of Captain Thomas Bowrey. Monsoon Books. ISBN 978-1-912049-63-9.
- Zandersen, Jakob Sander (1931). Svendborg og Assens Amter [Svendborg and Assens Counties] (PDF) (in Danish). Copenhagen: Amts Historiens Forlag. p. 74.
