= Hartvig Asche von Schack =

- Born: 1644; Lübeck
- Died: 1692 (aged 47–48); Ghent, Spanish Netherlands
- Military career
- Allegiance: Denmark
- Branch: Foot
- Service years: 1665-1692
- Rank: Major-general
- Commands: Prince George's Regiment
- Conflicts: Scanian War; Williamite War in Ireland; Nine Years' War

Hartvig Asche von Schack, born 1644, died of wounds received at the battle of Steenkerque 1692, was one of many North German noblemen serving the King of Denmark.

Schack entered Danish service 1665 as an ensign in the colonel's company of his close relative Hans Schack's regiment. Becoming a groom of the chamber 1677, he was gradually promoted in that regiment, becoming its colonel in 1678; the regiment by then being named Prince George's Regiment. In the meantime he had served as commandant of Kronborg, and distinguished himself in the Scanian War, being wounded at the assault of Malmö 1677. Brigadier in 1684 and Major-general in 1689, when he retired from his regimental command. Serving in the Danish Auxiliary Corps in Ireland and Flanders, he was severely wounded at the battle of Steenkerque, dying a few days later.

Hartvig Asche von Schack was son of the commandant of Lübeck, Colonel Hartvig Asche von Schack of Basthorst of German uradel and Dorothea Hedvig Sehested. He was married to Baroness Anna Margrethe Kielman von Kielmansegg in her first marriage; a son and namesake making a distinguished military career. The widow's second remarriage was with Schack's former comrade in arms, Colonel Hans Hartmann von Erffa.
