= Ernst von Tettau =

Julius Ernst von Tettau
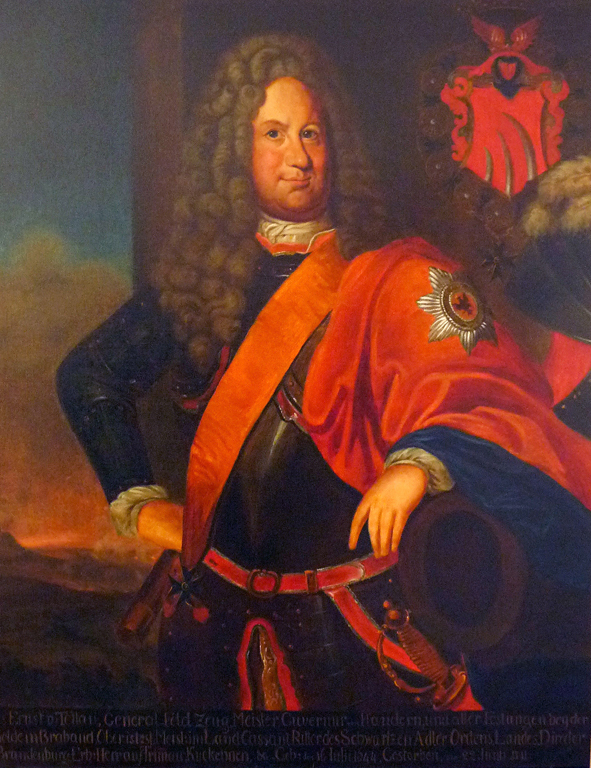
- Born: July 16, 1644; Doblienen, Duchy of Prussia
- Died: June 22, 1711 (aged 66)
- Burial place: Allenburg, Duchy of Prussia
- Military career
- Allegiance: Dutch Republic; Kingdom of France; Electorate of Brandenburg; Denmark; Electorate of Brandenburg
- Branch: Infantry Engineers
- Rank: Danish Major-general; Brandenburg Lieutenant-general; Dutch Generalfeldzeugmeister
- Conflicts: War of Devolution; Scanian War; Williamite War in Ireland; Nine Years' War
- Awards: De la Générosité; Black Eagle

Julius Ernst von Tettau (July 16, 1644 – June 22, 1711) was a Brandenburg-Prussian subject serving in the Dutch, French, Danish, and Brandenburg armies, reaching general officers rank in Danish, Brandenburg, and Dutch service.

Becoming orphan at an early age, Ernst von Tettau entered Dutch service as a cadet at age 13. After some years in a Dutch regiment, he entered French service, becoming ensign in 1661. He fought under Turenne in the War of Devolution. Later studying the art of fortification in France, he returned to his homeland. Tettau served as fortress builder, but also as tutor for the Kurprinz, the later King Frederick. During the Scanian War, he fought as military engineer and battalion commander against the Swedes. Before the end of the war, he came to Denmark as a major in the Regiment von Lehndorf, loaned by the Elector of Brandenburg to the King of Denmark; distinguishing himself in Skåne, being promoted to lieutenant-colonel 1678, and colonel 1679.

After the war, Tettau became colonel of the Danish Sjællandske geworbne Regiment in Schleswig until 1684. Promoted brigadier and subsequently major-general he was in charge of fortress building in Norway. In 1689 he became Major-general of Foot in the Danish Auxiliary Corps in Ireland, distinguishing himself at the sieges of Cork, Kinsale, Athlone, and Limerick. Yet, following his Sovereign's wishes he entered into service with the Brandenburg auxiliary corps in Dutch service. Distinguishing himself in Flanders, he was wounded in action at the battle of Steenkerque 1692, and advanced to Brandenburg Lieutenant-general and Dutch Generalfeldzeugmeister. At the end of the war, he returned to East Prussia, where he had large estates, distinguishing himself in civilian service.

A counterscarp at Fredriksten fortress is named after Ernst von Tettau.
