= Frederic Henri de la Forest-Suzannet =

Marquess Frédéric Henri de La Forest de Suzannet
- Born: unknown date Poitou
- Died: 1701 unknown
- Military career
- Allegiance: Duchy of Brunswick-Luneburg; Denmark; Electorate of Saxony
- Branch: Horse
- Rank: General
- Conflicts: Williamite War in Ireland; Nine Years' War

Marquess Frédéric Henri de La Forest de Suzannet (July 8, 1646 in France – March 1701 in Warsaw, Poland) was a French Huguenot in Lunenburg, Danish, and Saxon service.

Religious persecution forced Marquess de La Forest to leave his homeland, entering into Lunenburg service as captain of horse. In 1683, with permission of King Louis XIV, he moved to Denmark with his son, Jacques-Frédéric de la Forest-Suzannet and his half-brother Philippe-Frédéric de la Forest-Suzannet. Being commissioned a colonel in 1683, he was given a patent to raise a regiment of horse, which however did not come beyond the first start.

In 1686, thanks to the help of the Danish monarchs, he was authorized to bring his wife and daughters to Copenhagen.

In 1689, enjoying the favours of the Danish court, he was promoted to major-general and appointed Danish minister at the Court of St James, and advisor to Prince George of Denmark, the husband of the future Queen Anne. His main task was to win the support of King William in Denmark's conflict with the Duke of Holstein-Gottorp, and in this regard negotiate about Danish military assistance in the war against the Jacobites.

Having successfully negotiated a treaty of military assistance, Marquess de La Forest became Major-general of Horse in the Danish Auxiliary Corps sent to Ireland in accordance with that treaty. In 1694 he was promoted to Lieutenant-general in the Corps by William of Orange, becoming Danish lieutenant-general in 1697. At the end of the Nine Years' War he resigned from Danish service, settling in Ireland on an estate given to him by King William.

Two years later, in 1697, however, he is a full general in Saxon service, commanding 8 000 men with orders to support Danemark in its war against Sweden. In 1699, the king of Poland asked the marquis to stay with his regiment in Poland where he dies in March 1701 at the age of 55.

Marquess de La Forest was the only child of Frédéric de Suzannet and Esther Henry de Cheusses. Once a widower, his father remarried to Elizabeth de Courcillon, sister to the marquis of Dangeau and had four other children.

Frédéric-Henri de la Forest-Suzannet married his first cousin Renée-Marie Henry de Cheusses. Two of their sons died in the opera house fire in Copenhagen 1689. Jacques-Frédéric, their only surviving son, became Groom of the Privy Bedchamber to the king of England.
