= Blockade of Porto Novo =

1683 blockade of a South Indian harbour

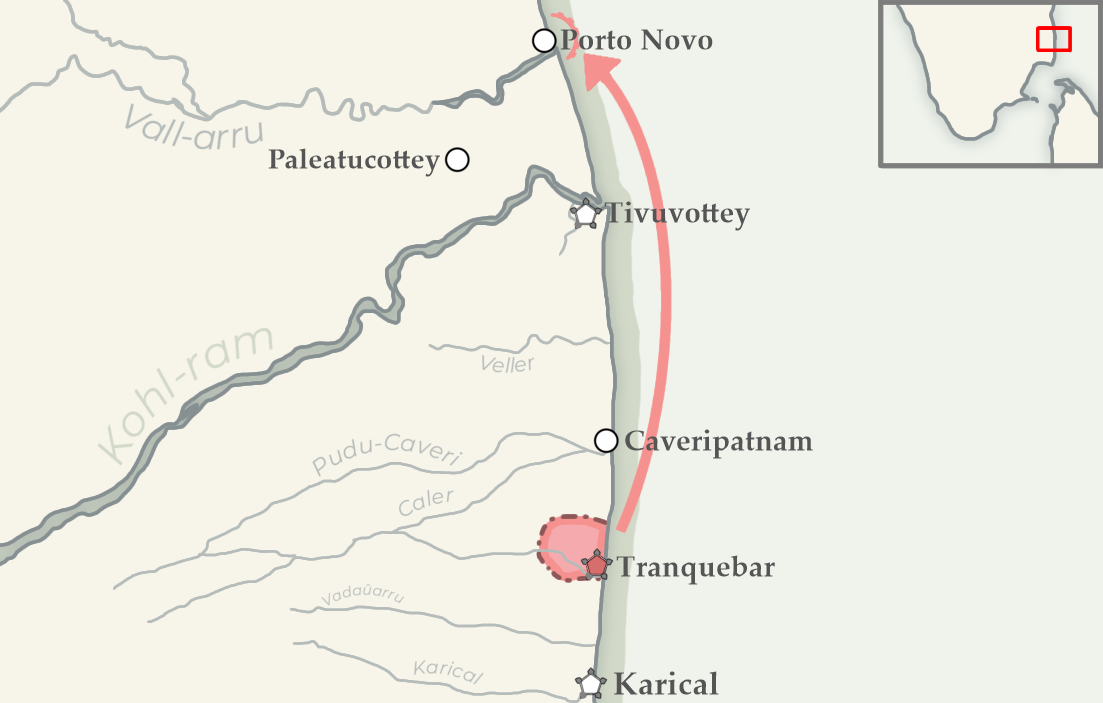
- Map of Axel Juel's blockade of Porto Novo and surrounding areas
Date	March 1683, August 1684 – c. 1687
Location	Porto Novo (present-day Parangipettai, India) 11.49°N 79.76°E
Result	Danish victory
Territorial changes	Status quo ante bellum

Belligerents
Danish India	Porto Novo; Danish hitmen

Commanders and leaders
(Danish India) Axel Juel	Gopal Pundit; Peder Trane

Units involved
Unknown	Unknown

Strength
4 warships	3-4 ships

Casualties and losses
Unknown	6 vessels Some killed

The blockade of Porto Novo (Danish: Blokaden af Porto Novo), also known as the siege of Porto Novo (Belejringen af Porto Novo), was a Danish blockade of the Indian trade centre Porto Novo (present-day Parangipettai) starting in August 1684 and continuing for three to four years, while the siege is described as taking place in March 1683. The events extremely affected Porto Novo's trade and cost the city 60,000 écus annually.

== Background ==
The Danish East India Company was founded in 1616 and established its first settlement in Tranquebar in South India in 1620. Cargoes from Denmark–Norway were sent regularly, until the Dano-Swedish Wars c. 1659 broke the connection, and the first D.E.I.C. was subsequently dissolved. A new Danish company was established in 1670, with Sivert Adeler becoming governor of Danish India in 1683. Adeler left Tranquebar on 6 January 1682, and Axel Juel became governor thereafter.

== Siege and blockade ==
Already in 1682, Juel is said to have cruised around the Indian trading centre Porto Novo (present-day Parangipettai) with two ships, waiting for returning Moorish ships to be conquered.

In March 1683, the Danes had a dispute with the local subahdar, Gopal Pundit, and besieged Porto Novo. The warfare was conducted on the sea, and the Danes blockaded the Vellar River. Meanwhile, they held three or four Dutch vessels with the VOC's accounts, coming from Ceylon. The ships were only released upon a written complaint by the Dutch, as the Danes did not expect any more ships from Porto Novo. The Danes had already seized six ships, and the remaining ships from the harbour fled to Trimelevaas and Nagapattinam. At one point, Governor Axel Juel came in person with four warships, heavily bombarding the city at the cost of some lives.

Thereafter, Juel demanded three things:

1. Double compensation for an amount of 200 pagodas
2. Tariff-free status for 300 bales of cloth instead of 150 bales, which was previously granted to them
3. A written agreement from the merchants to annually ship 600 bales of cloth by freight with their ships to Malacca or Achin

These demands were not granted by Gopal Pundit, and Juel quickly returned to Tranquebar instead of attempting anything more. In September 1683, a Danish ship returned before Portonovo, yet the inhabitants now sent out their ships under Portuguese, French, and English flags. This made the dispute advantageous Dutch VOC; they did not help the Danes with drinking water in Tegenapatam when they asked for it, and a protest was also made against the damage caused by the Danish Company to the Dutch lodge in Porto Novo. However, the Danes managed to bring about a favorable peace settlement with Pundit in the same year.

Despite this, the French governor of Pondicherry, François Martin, wrote in his Mémoires de François Martin that Danes at Tranquebar had a great dispute with the governor of Porto Novo starting in 1684. According to Martin, Governor Juel was driven by his obstinate passion to refuse to render justice, and caused the loss of Porto Novo's trade. For nearly three or four years, the Danes prevented any vessel from leaving the harbour. This resulted in a loss of more than 60,000 écus each year in revenue for Porto Novo.

== Aftermath ==
The favourable outcome for Juel has been described as lucky, and the Danish economic situation worsened. This resulted in a planned mutiny against Juel in 1684, which was exposed, and two of the conspirators were executed. During a larger lawsuit in Denmark against Juel's governorship in 1689, it was discovered that Porto Novo hired a Danish officer and two local Indians as hitmen to assassinate other Danish officers. The Danish hitman, Peder Trane, was subsequently sentenced to death. Furthermore, Juel is said to have profited over 14,000 Danish rigsdaler from the war.

== Works cited ==
- Coolhaas, Ed (2007). Generale missiven van gouverneurs-generaal en raden aan heren XVII (in Dutch). Vol. III.
- Martin, François (1931). Mémoires de François Martin [The memoirs of François Martin] (in French). Vol. 3. Paris: Publications de la Société française d'histoire des outre-mers. pp. 360–361.
- Pringle, Arthur T. (1894). The Diary and Consultation Book of the Agent Governor and Council of Fort St. George: 1683. Superintendent, Government Press.
- Krarup, Frederik (1894). Museum: tidsskrift for historie og geografi. 1894,1 (in Danish). Bavarian State Library.
- Larsen, Kay (1940). Guvernører, Residenter, Kommandanter og Chefer (PDF) (in Danish). Copenhagen: Arthur Jensens Forlag. p. 61.
- Krarup, Frederik (1937). Dansk Biografisk Leksikon [Danish Biographic Lexicon] (PDF) (in Danish). Copenhagen: J. H. Schultz Forlag.
