= Thomas Maxwell (Jacobite) =

Scottish military officer (d. 1693

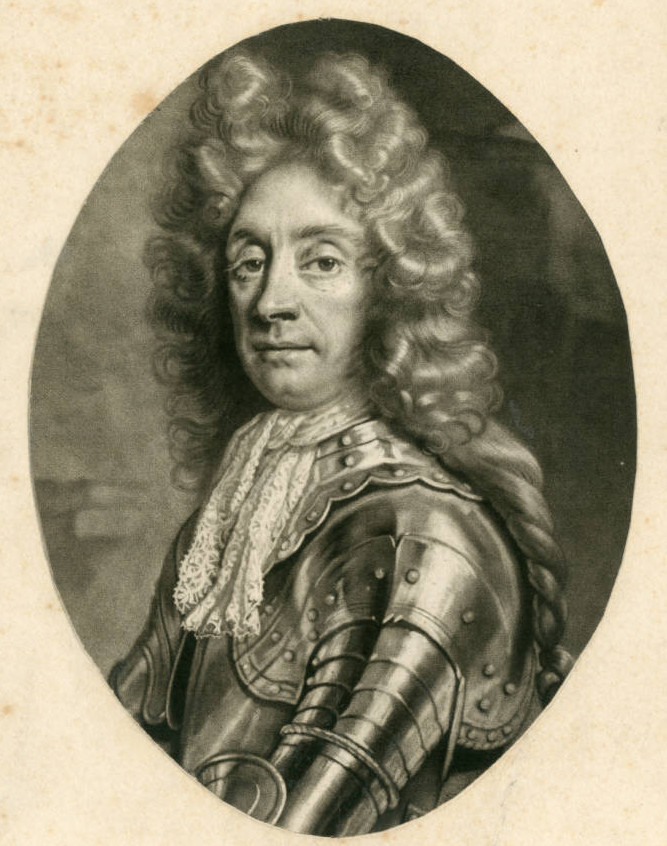
- Thomas Maxwell, c.1692, after portrait by Closterman
- Born: Nithsdale, Scotland
- Died: 1693; Marsaglia, Piedmont
- Military career
- Allegiance: Kingdom of Ireland; France
- Service years: 1671-1693
- Rank: Major General
- Conflicts: Williamite War in Ireland: Battle of the Boyne; Siege of Athlone; Nine Years War

Thomas Maxwell (died 1693) was a Scottish professional soldier.

Maxwell, an officer of dragoons, spent much of his career with the English and subsequently the Irish Royal Army; during the Williamite war in Ireland he was a member of the Jacobite party, remaining loyal to the deposed James II.

Following the Jacobite defeat in Ireland and a period of imprisonment in England, Maxwell entered French service on the Continent, where he was killed in battle soon afterwards.

== Life ==
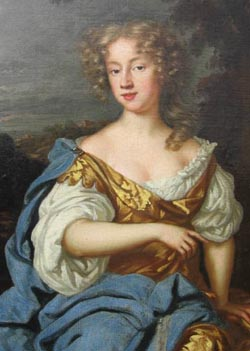
Maxwell's wife Jane

Relatively little is known of Maxwell's origins. His family were members of the tiny Scottish Roman Catholic minority, and were a cadet branch of the family of Maxwell of Kirkconnel, Kirkcudbrightshire. He entered the Scots College, Douai in 1662, but transferred to the Royal Scots College in Madrid in 1664 at his own request.

Although as a Catholic his career prospects were limited, Maxwell joined the army in 1671. After the accession of the Catholic James II to the throne, Maxwell's prospects improved, particularly as a protege of James's close advisor the Earl of Melfort. He was appointed colonel of Princess Anne of Denmark's Regiment of Dragoons in England in 1688, replacing John Berkeley, 4th Viscount Fitzhardinge.

While stationed in England he married Jane Howard, Duchess of Norfolk.

Several engraved portraits of Maxwell after a now lost portrait by Closterman exist.

== Williamite War ==
At the time of the Glorious Revolution of late 1688, Maxwell was among the officers who stayed loyal to James after his deposition by his Protestant son-in-law William. Travelling to Ireland, where the army remained under James's control, he was given the colonelcy of the Seventh Regiment of dragoons; he was stationed at Bangor in eastern Ulster at the time of the main Williamite landings in 1689.

During the subsequent conflict Maxwell was present at the Jacobite defeat at the Boyne. Commissioned as one of six Jacobite major-generals, he was one of the officers appointed to advise James's illegitimate son the Duke of Berwick, who was given overall command of the army during the later part of 1690.

Maxwell and Berwick were supporters of the plans of James's viceroy Tyrconnell to negotiate a peaceful end to the conflict. Another faction of the Jacobite leadership, led by Patrick Sarsfield, opposed seeking a settlement; when in late 1690 they sent fellow generals Luttrell and Purcell to France to argue their case, Berwick ordered Maxwell to accompany them, with secret instructions to have them arrested on arrival. According to Berwick's memoirs, Luttrell and Purcell discovered the plan during the voyage and suggested throwing Maxwell overboard, before being dissuaded by the Bishop of Cork.

During the 1691 campaign Maxwell was assigned as commander of the garrison of Athlone during its siege by the Williamite army; the efforts of his regiment of dragoons to defend the bridge over the River Shannon later became a celebrated example of bravery. He was taken prisoner when the defences were overrun; Sarsfield's faction later unfairly accused Maxwell of treachery due to his links with Tyrconnell.

Maxwell was sent to the Tower of London along with William Dorrington and several other senior Jacobites captured at Aughrim shortly after the fall of Athlone. The main Jacobite force eventually capitulated at Limerick in October, ending the war.

== Death ==
After his release in January 1693, Maxwell rejoined the remainder of the former Jacobite army, which had entered French service under the terms of the Treaty of Limerick. He was killed at the Battle of Marsaglia in October.

== Sources ==
- Burke, Sir Bernard (1884). The General Armory, v2. Harrison.
- O'Callaghan, John (1885). History of the Irish brigades in the service of France, from the revolution in Great Britain and Ireland under James II, to the revolution in France under Louis XVI. Cameron and Ferguson.
- Childs, John (2007). The Williamite Wars in Ireland 1688 - 1691. London: Hambledon Continuum Press. ISBN 978-1-85285-573-4.
- d’Alton, John (1861). Illustrations, Historical and Genealogical, of King James's Irish Army List, 1689. Smith.
- Downes, Kerry (1987). Sir John Vanbrugh: A biography. Sidgwick & Jackson.
- Murtagh, Diarmuid (1948). "Sergeant Custume and the Bridge of Athlone". Studies: An Irish Quarterly Review. 37 (148 (Dec.)).
- Taylor, Maurice (1971). The Scots College in Spain. Andrés Martín.
