= Danish Auxiliary Corps in Anglo-Dutch service 1701–1714 =

Having been forced to sue for peace with Sweden in 1700, the Danish army was much larger than the kingdom could support. The King decided to put almost half of the army under Allied command during the War of the Spanish Succession. Twelve thousand soldiers were in 1701 made available to the Allied powers in Flanders through a treaty with the Dutch Republic and England. The Danish corps fought under Marlborough at the battles of Blenheim, Ramillies, Oudenarde, and Malplaquet suffering heavy losses. It returned to Denmark in 1713 and 1714.

== Background ==
The Swedish landing on Zealand forced Denmark-Norway out of the coalition that began the Great Nordic War. Through the peace of Travendal Denmark-Norway had to return Holstein-Gottorp to its duke, a Swedish ally, and to leave the anti-Swedish alliance. The large Danish army prepared for a major war against Sweden, became a major burden on the Danish economy, when it couldn't, as anticipated, live off enemy land. Downsizing the army was not possible; the King wanting to retain the option of going to war with Sweden at some future date, in order to regain the provinces lost in the treaty of Roskilde 1658. The King therefore decided to make more than half of the Danish army's 35,000 soldiers, two-thirds of which were enlisted in Germany, available to the Allied powers during the War of the Spanish Succession. Political goodwill thus gained, could in addition be useful in future wars with Sweden and Holstein-Gottorp.

== Terms and conditions ==
Twelve thousand soldiers were in 1701 made available to the Allied powers through a Danish defensive alliance with the Dutch Republic and the Kingdom of England. Of these, three thousand would be horse, one thousand dragoons, and eight thousand foot. As compensation Denmark received 540,000 rixdollars as levy money, as well as 300,000 rixdollars annually as long as the war lasted. Previous monetary claims on Denmark were dropped by the powers. The Danish auxiliary corps would be paid and provisioned according to Dutch regulations, and the pay disbursed by Danish paymasters. At the end of each year's campaign season the Danish corps would receive the same recruitment money as the Dutch army, in order to replace its manpower losses. If a company or regiment would be destroyed, its commanding officer would receive recruitment money sufficiently enough to re-raise it. The agreement expired in ten years. If twelve thousand soldiers were not enough, the Danish king would put another four thousand soldiers at the disposal of the powers. In 1703 two additional regiments, one dragoon and one foot, were raised in the name of the minor dukes of Württemberg-Oels. But they were raised by Denmark and formed part of the Danish auxiliary corps, and when the regiments were disbanded after the end of the war, the soldiers were transferred to Danish service.

== Blenheim ==
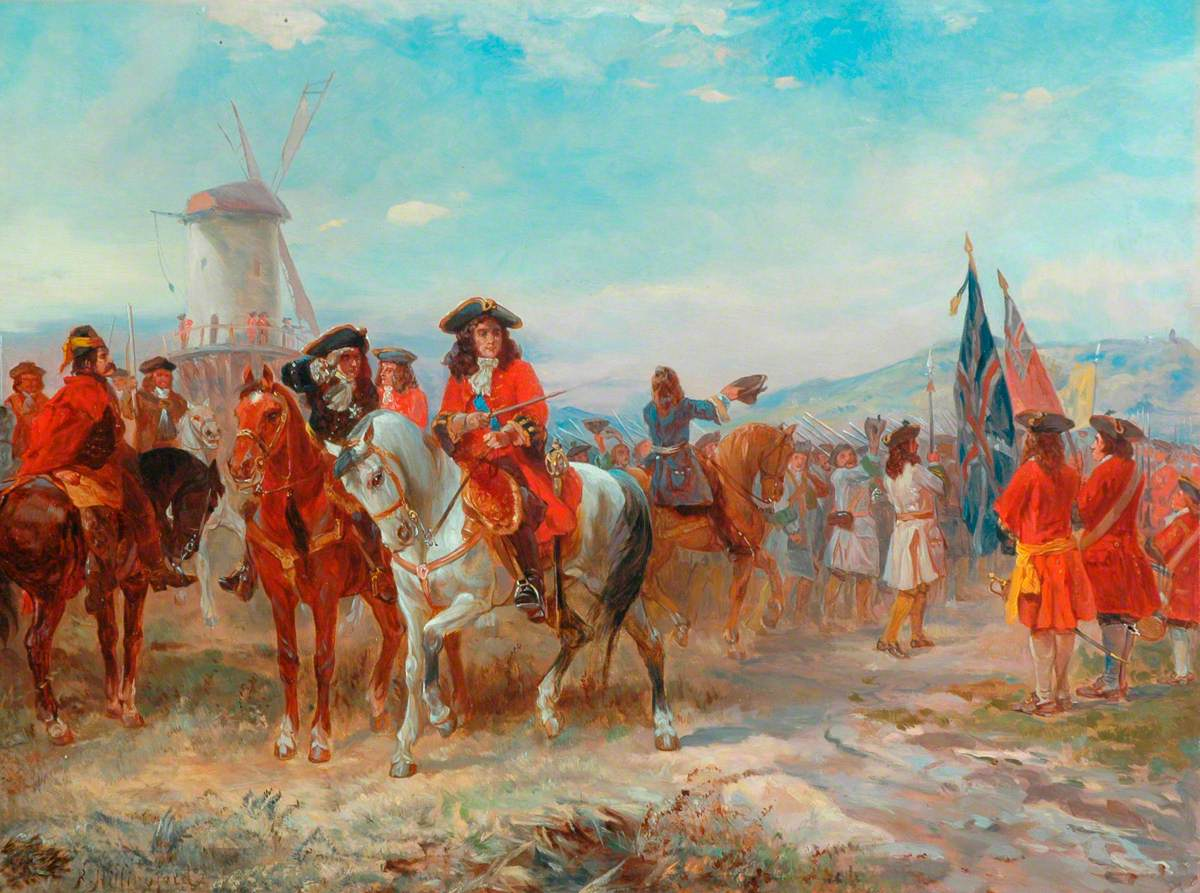
Meeting of the Duke of Marlborough and Prince Eugene at Blenheim, 1704 by Robert Alexander Hillingford.

The Danish corps was commanded by duke Carl Rudolf of Württemberg. Its infantry embarked in Glückstadt in October 1701, and was landed in Nordholland. The cavalry crossed the Elbe, and marched through Hanover and Münster to Friesland and Brabant. During most campaigns, the corps belonged to the Allied armies of Flanders. In 1702 it participated in the capture of the Liege citadel after the citizens had open the town gates for Marlborough's army, and in the drawn battle of Beverloo. In 1703 the Württemberg-Oels' regiments joined the corps. In 1704 Marlborough's army marched to southern Germany, but Duke Carl refused to march until the Danish corps was paid. When the matter was settled in Danish favour in the middle of March, the corps was placed in southern Brabant, remaining there until the end of July, when it was ordered to join the main army after a march of 700 km. The cavalry marched strait to Nördlingen, the infantry took a longer route and was put under Eugene of Savoy's army in Heidelberg. Hostile Bavaria was severely harried as punishment for its elector having joined Louis XIV against the Emperor. In August Marlborough's and Eugene's armies merged and won a decisive victory at the battle of Blenheim. Danish casualties amounted to 2,300 killed and wounded of the total Allied casualties of 13,000.

== Ramillies ==
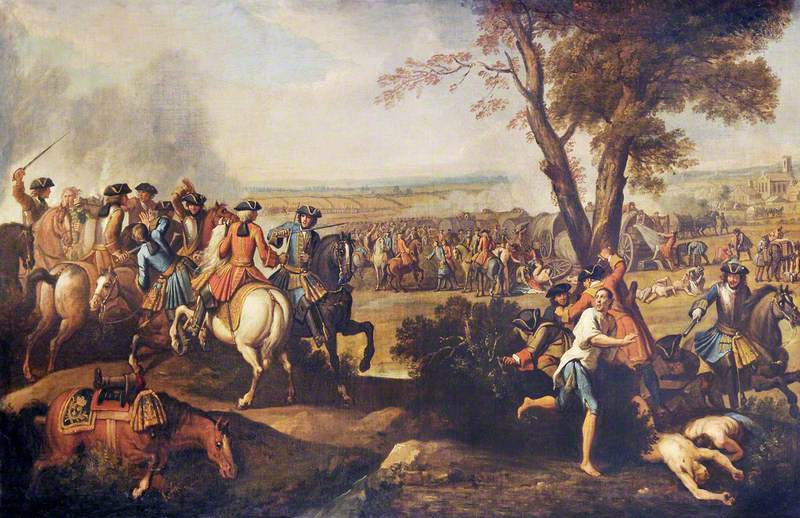
Pursuit of the French after the Battle of Ramillies.

In the autumn of 1704 the Danish corps, again completely under Marlborough's command, took part in the sieges and captures of Trarbach and Saarburg. Its winter quarters were between the Moselle and the Rhine. The 1705 campaign was spoiled by severe disagreements among the Allied commanders, and no offensive operations took place. In the spring of 1706, duke Carl again refused to march until the Dutch Republic had fulfilled its obligations, and it was not until the end of May that the corps joined Marlborough's army. Especially its cavalry played a large role in the victory at the battle of Ramillies, attacking the French and Bavarian flank, losing 600 men and 800 horses. Later participating in the sieges and captures of Antwerp, Ostend, Menen, Ath, Dendermonde and Oudenaarde, it suffered a total of 2,200 soldiers and 1,300 horses lost in 1706. New recruits filled, however, its ranks during the winter. In 1707 Marlborough's army was on the defensive, since half of his troops had been transferred to Spain and Germany.

== Oudenarde and Malplaquet ==
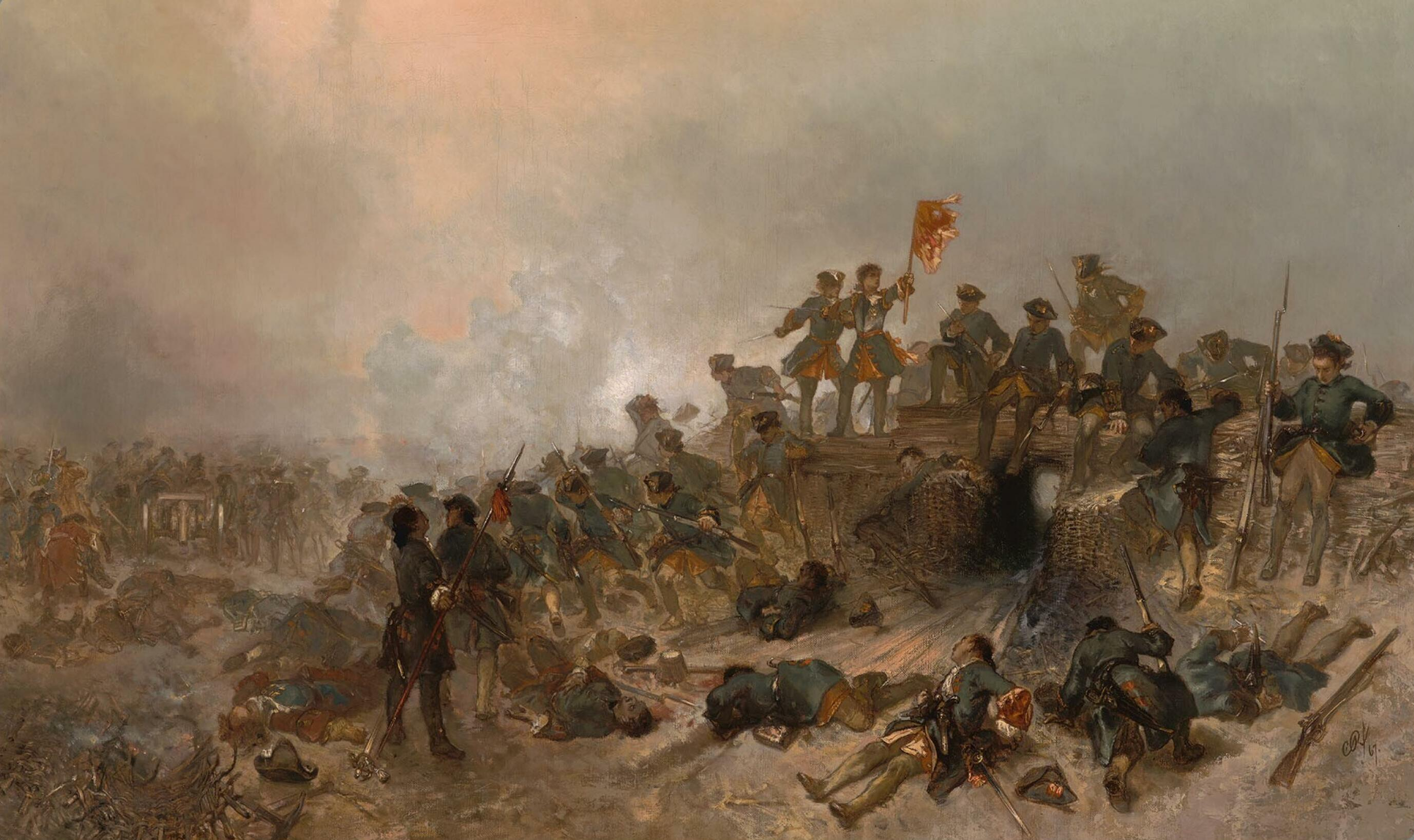
The assault of the Dutch army on the French left during the Battle of Malplaquet, led by the Prince of Orange.

In 1708 the French invaded Flanders with a huge army, threatening to land in England, and Eugene of Savoy came to Marlborough's relief with large Imperial army. In the battle of Oudenarde the Danish cavalry under Jørgen Rantzau made a significant contribution, capturing three French battalions. In all, the campaigns of 1708 led to 3,500 casualties in the Danish corps, but its ranks were soon filled by new recruits, many of which were defectors and deserters from the French lines. In 1709 the Danish corps remained in its winter quarters until June, awaiting the one million guilders owed by the Dutch Republic. The campaign of 1709 began with the capture of Tournai, followed by the battle of Malplaquet, where the Danish corps suffered 1,300 casualties. The victory made it possible for the Allied to capture Mons before the end of the year. The war during the two following years consisted mainly of sieges. In 1712 peace negotiations began between France and the United Kingdom, and the British government no longer had any use of the Danish regiments in its service. They were, however, immediately taken over by the Dutch Republic. In 1713, the "English" units of the corps returned to Denmark, and in 1714 the rest.

== Order of Battle ==
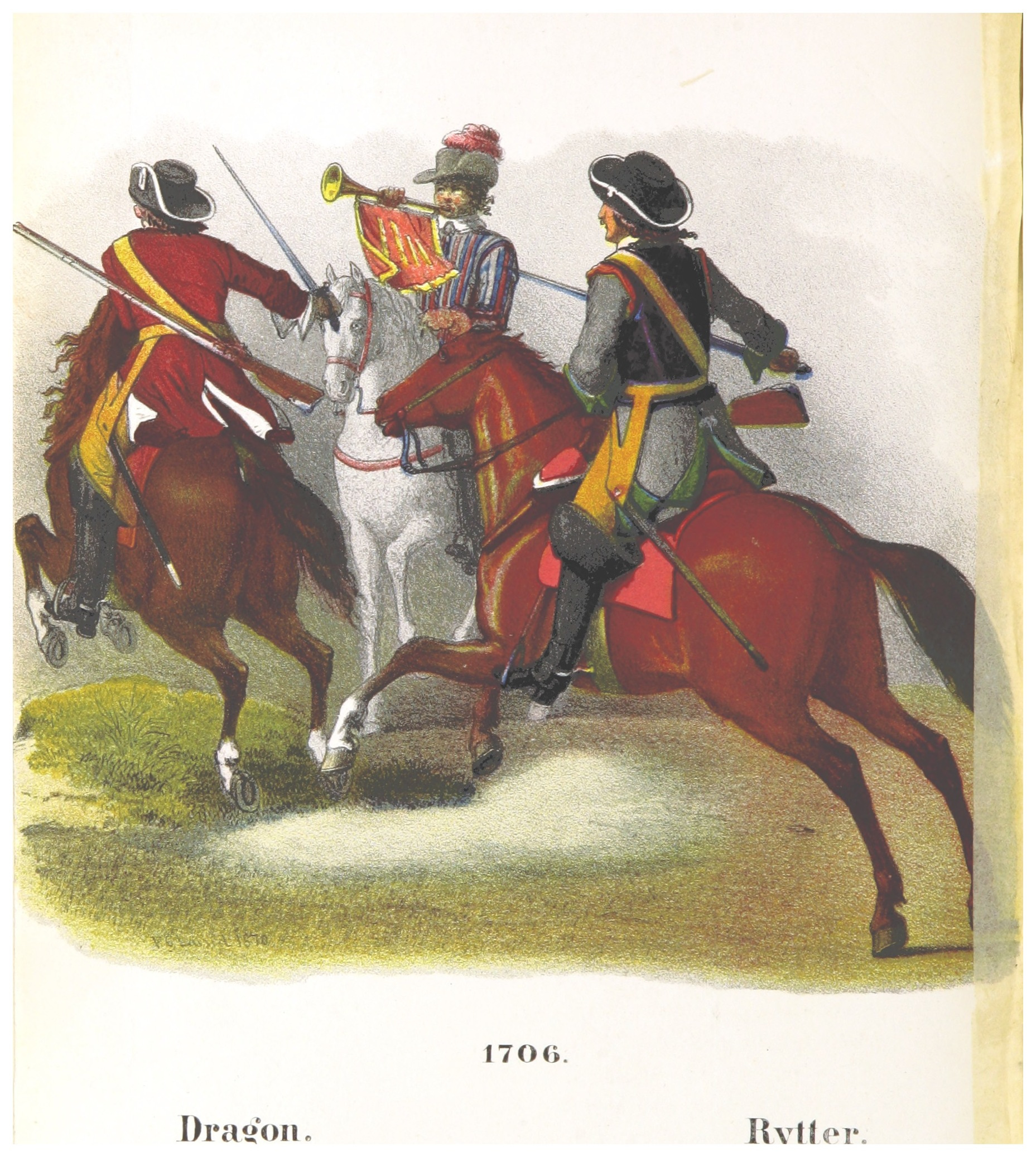
Danish dragoon (left) och trooper (right) 1706.

The Danish Auxiliary Corps in Anglo-Dutch services contained 16 squadrons of horse, and nine battalions of foot. A squadron of horse had three companies; each battalion of foot seven companies. The Württemberg-Oels dragoons and foot were added in 1703.

Mother regiments	Auxiliary Corps	In the pay of
Horse
Livregiment til Hest	2 squadrons	Dutch Republic
Ahlefeldts Kyrasserregiment (Würtembergske Kyrasserregiment 1705)	2 squadrons	England
Holstenske Rytterregiment	2 squadrons	England
2. Sjællandske Rytterregiment	2 squadrons	Dutch Republic
2. Jyske Rytterregiment	2 squadrons	England
3. Jyske Rytterregiment	2 squadrons	England
4. Jyske Rytterregiment	2 squadrons	Dutch Republic
5. Jyske Rytterregiment	2 squadrons	Dutch Republic
Foot
Garden	1 battalion	Dutch Republic
Prins Carls Regiment	2 battalions	England
Prins Georges Regiment	2 battalions	England
Sjællandske Regiment	2 battalions	Dutch Republic
Fynske Regiment	1 battalion	Dutch Republic
Oldenburgske Regiment	1 battalion	England
Reinforcements 1703
Württemberg-Oels Dragoner	2 squadrons	England, Dutch Republic
Hertugen af Württemberg-Oels Regiment	1 battalion	England, Dutch Republic

== See also ==
- Danish Auxiliary Corps in Habsburg service 1701-1709
- Danish Auxiliary Corps in the Williamite War in Ireland
