= Johann Dietrich von Haxthausen =

Major-general and Danish commander

Baron Johann Dietrich von Haxthausen
- Born: January 29, 1652; Petershagen, Bishopric of Minden
- Died: December 1, 1703 (aged 51); Imst, Tyrol
- Military career
- Allegiance: Denmark
- Branch: Foot
- Rank: Major-general
- Commands: Danish Auxiliary Corps in Habsburg Service
- Conflicts: Scanian War; Williamite War in Ireland; Nine Years' War; Great Northern War; War of the Spanish Succession

Johann Dietrich von Haxthausen , born 1652, died 1703, was one of many North German noblemen serving the King of Denmark, becoming a major-general and commander of the Danish Auxiliary Corps in Habsburg service.

Haxthausen entered into Danish service as a young man. In 1675 he was a captain in Bauditz Regiment, shortly thereafter transferred to the Danish Guards, promoted to major in the Queen's Regiment 1677, made a lieutenant-colonel next year. In 1689 he was promoted to colonel, and became commanding officer of the Queen's Battalion in the Danish Auxiliary Corps in Ireland, and later in Flanders; promoted to English brigadier 1693, and Danish brigadier the following year. Returning to Denmark 1698, he became commanding officer of the Queen's Regiment, which he led in the brief campaign in Holstein 1700. The following year Haxthausen was made Major-general of Foot and commanding officer of the battalion Prince Carl in the Danish Auxiliary Corps in Habsburg service. He distinguished himself at the Battle of Luzzara 1702, and became commander of the whole corps the following year. Suffering from a pulmonary disease, he had to resign his command, and died suddenly in Tyrol.
