= Lave Hohendorff =

1662–1729 Danish general officer

- Born: 7 November 1662; Copenhagen
- Died: 15 January 1729 (aged 66); Hamburg
- Military career
- Allegiance: Kingdom of France; Denmark
- Branch: Foot
- Rank: Lieutenant-general 1712
- Conflicts: Williamite War in Ireland; Nine Years' War; Great Northern War
- Awards: Order of the Dannebrog 1712

Lave Hohendorff (1662–1729) was a Danish general officer who had served in the Danish auxiliary corpses in Ireland and in Flanders, as well as in the Danish army in the Great Northern War.

As a very young man, Hohendorff in 1679 became a junior member of the Danish legation at the court of Versailles, yet soon leaving the diplomatic service for an officer's commission in the French Régiment Royal. Returning to Denmark in 1683, Hohendorff became a captain in the Danish Guards; in 1687 also a groom of the privy chamber. In 1689, he went with the Guards battalion in the Danish Auxiliary Corps to Ireland, and later to Flanders. Hohendorff was promoted to major in 1690, the same year he was wounded by a cannonball at the siege of Kinsale. Wounded in action and prisoner of war at the battle of Steenkerque 1692, he was soon exchanged, promoted to lieutenant-colonel, and made commanding officer of the battalion.

When the Danish Auxiliary Corps returned to Denmark in 1689, Hohendorff was made colonel of the Norwegian Smålenske Regiment with headquarters at Fredrikstad. Yet, already next year he became colonel of the Marine Regiment at Copenhagen. When the Swedish army landed at Humlebæk in 1700, Hohendorff was in command of the force sent to prevent the landing operation, but it was called back before reaching the coast. Hohendorff was promoted to brigadier in 1703, becoming commandant of Rendsborg in 1707. The following year he was sent to Flanders as a major-general in the Danish Auxiliary Corps in Anglo-Dutch service; honourable participating in the battles of Oudenarde and Malplaquet, and the siege of Lille. Called back to Denmark in 1711, Hohendorff was promoted lieutenant-general the following year when the Danish Army was reorganized. Yet again commandant of Rendsborg, he led the center of the Danish army at the battle of Gadebusch 1712, and participated in the sieges of Tönning, Hamburg, and Wismar. After resigning from the army in 1714, Hohendorff lived in Hamburg until his death.
