= Siege of Athlone (1691) =

1691 siege

- Part of the Williamite War in Ireland
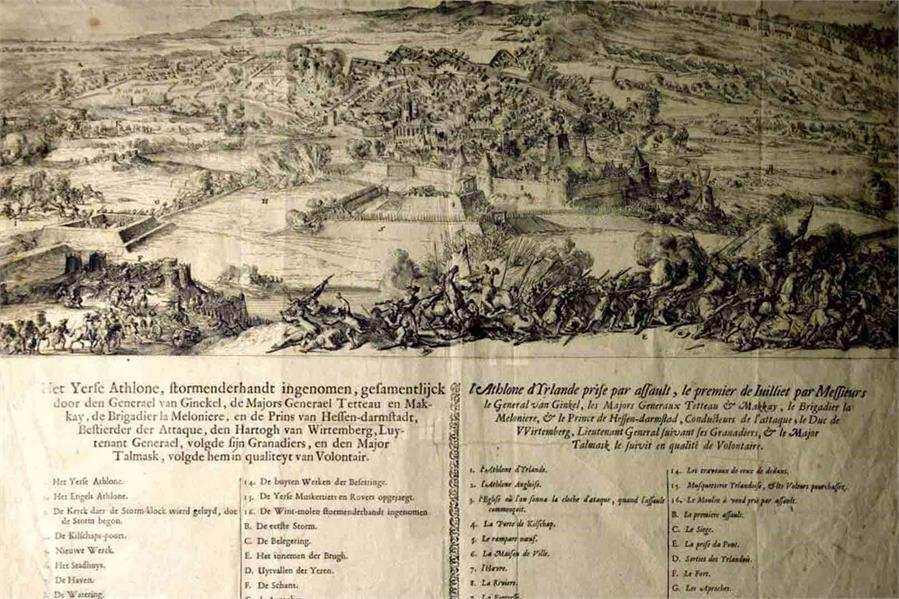
Date	June 1691
Location	Athlone, Ireland 53°26′00″N 7°57′00″W
Result	Williamite victory

Belligerents
Williamites; Dutch Republic	Jacobites (Kingdom of France) France

Commanders and leaders
(Dutch Republic) Godert de Ginkell (Dutch Republic) `Ernst von Tettau; Hugh Mackay	Richard Grace † (Kingdom of France) Jean de Bonnac; Thomas Maxwell

Strength
18,000	1,500 (garrison only)

Casualties and losses
60 killed 120 wounded	1,000 killed

Athlone was besieged twice during the Williamite War in Ireland (1689–91). The town is situated in the centre of Ireland on the River Shannon and commanded the bridge crossing the river into the Jacobite-held province of Connacht. For this reason, it was of key strategic importance.

== Background ==
The army of William III first besieged Athlone in 1690, shortly after their defeat of the main Jacobite army at the Battle of the Boyne. James Douglas and about 7,500 troops attempted to take the town, but the Jacobite garrison's commander, Colonel Richard Grace, refused to surrender. Lacking siege artillery, Douglas was forced to withdraw after a week.

In the summer of the following year, the Williamite army, having regrouped at Mullingar under the command of Dutch general Godart de Ginkel, marched via Ballymore to make a second attempt on Athlone.

The Jacobite commander, the Marquis de St Ruth, marched his main field army from its winter quarters in Limerick to meet the threat. He drew up his force to the west of the town; other Jacobite troops manned fortifications in the ruins of the "English Town", the eastern half of Athlone, along with a garrison in the "Irish Town" on the western bank. This arrangement was intended to allow the Jacobites to fight a staggered, drawn-out defence, though the advantage was reduced by high ground on the Leinster bank of the Shannon and the fact that the river was running exceptionally low that year.

Jacobite defences were also hampered by disagreements between James's Viceroy, Tyrconnell, St Ruth, and Jacobite general Patrick Sarsfield. When Tyrconnell asserted his seniority and offered advice on the defences to St Ruth, the latter refused to recognise Tyrconnell's command, while Sarsfield sent him a message that his pavilion ropes would be cut if he did not leave immediately. Though Tyrconnell surmised that a large number of the best Jacobite troops would side with him, he chose to depart for Limerick rather than split the army.

== Siege ==
Ginkel opened an assault on the eastern part of Athlone on 20 June, which caused the Jacobites to retreat to the west bank of the river, dismantling the bridge in the process. Colonel Grace, who had been superseded as garrison commander by the French officer d'Usson, was killed in a bombardment at the western end of the bridge on the same day.

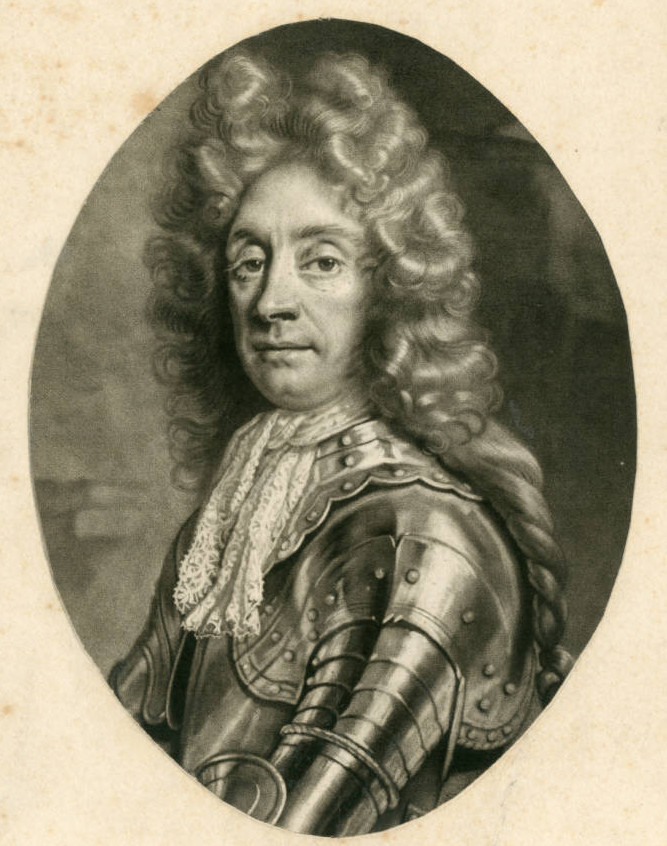
Major-General Thomas Maxwell commanded the Jacobite forces in Athlone

The Jacobite forces in the western half of Athlone, led by Major-General Thomas Maxwell, a Scottish Catholic, initially held off the Williamite assault; there was fierce fighting centred on the bridge over the Shannon. The Williamites tried to lay planks over the partially wrecked structure, which the Irish Jacobite troops managed to destroy despite coming under intense fire. One such Jacobite sortie, by a small group of volunteers from Maxwell's dragoon regiment led by a Sergeant Custume or Costy, all of whom were killed, later passed into Irish folklore as an example of bravery. Several attempts by the Williamites to storm the bridge were repulsed with heavy losses.

The Williamite bombardment of the western, Connacht, side of the town was intense, with over 12,000 cannonballs and 600 bombs or mortars fired into the town. John Stevens, serving in the Grand Prior's Regiment, recorded that "with the balls and bombs flying so thick, that spot was hell on earth". During the ten-day bombardment, 32 heavy cannon and mortars fired one shot every minute: Athlone suffered the heaviest bombardment of any city in Britain and Ireland up until that point.

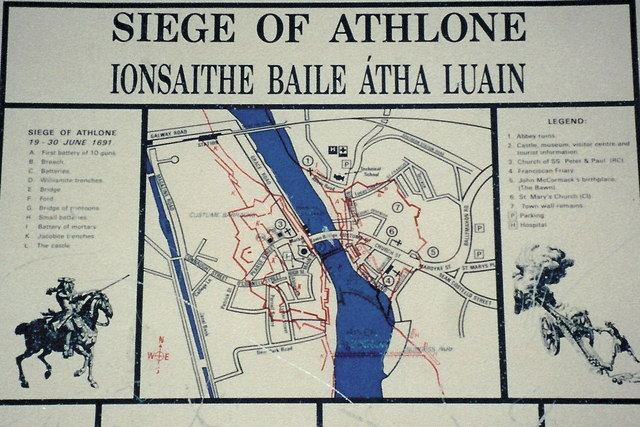
Local information board giving details of the siege.

While developing a plan to storm the bridge Ginkel identified another potential crossing point at a ford to the south. To test the crossing, on the morning of 29 June he ordered a Danish quartermaster and two privates, under sentence of death for cowardice, to ford the river while troops fired over their heads to give the impression they were deserting. All three forded to the western bank and returned safely, whereupon Ginkel sent a force of grenadiers, 2,000 strong, to cross there and attack the Jacobite positions from the rear.

Following an argument between St Ruth and the garrison commander d'Usson, the fortifications on the western side of the city had not been levelled, as Tyrconnell had suggested some days earlier. St Ruth did not issue an order to demolish them until 29 June, apparently believing it impossible that a city could be taken with a relieving army so close by. They remained standing a day later, and a party of Ginkel's grenadiers hurried to occupy them and raise the drawbridge there, holding off counter-attacks from St Ruth's army until the main Williamite force could be brought up. St Ruth detached two brigades under Major-General Hamilton to dislodge the Williamites, but after around an hour and a half of intense fighting, the Jacobites retreated.

== Aftermath ==
The breakthrough of the Williamites had forced the remains of the Jacobite garrison, who had been awaiting reinforcement from the main Jacobite force under St Ruth, to hastily abandon their positions in Athlone. Maxwell was captured; accusations of treachery were later levelled at him, partly as he had been a supporter of Tyrconnell's faction. St Ruth withdrew into County Galway, passing through Ballinasloe. The Jacobites had lost around 1,000 men at Athlone, though the highest estimates suggested losses of over 2,000, including colonels McGuinness, McMahon and O'Gara, in addition to Grace.

Ginkel continued to march towards Limerick, unaware of the position of St Ruth. On the morning of 12 July the Williamites were confronted by the main Jacobite army drawn up in a strong defensive position at Aughrim. In the ensuing Battle of Aughrim, Ginkel inflicted a crushing defeat on them, effectively ending Jacobite resistance in Ireland.
