= Chief of the Royal Danish Army =

Chief of the Army Command
- Chef for Hærkommandoen

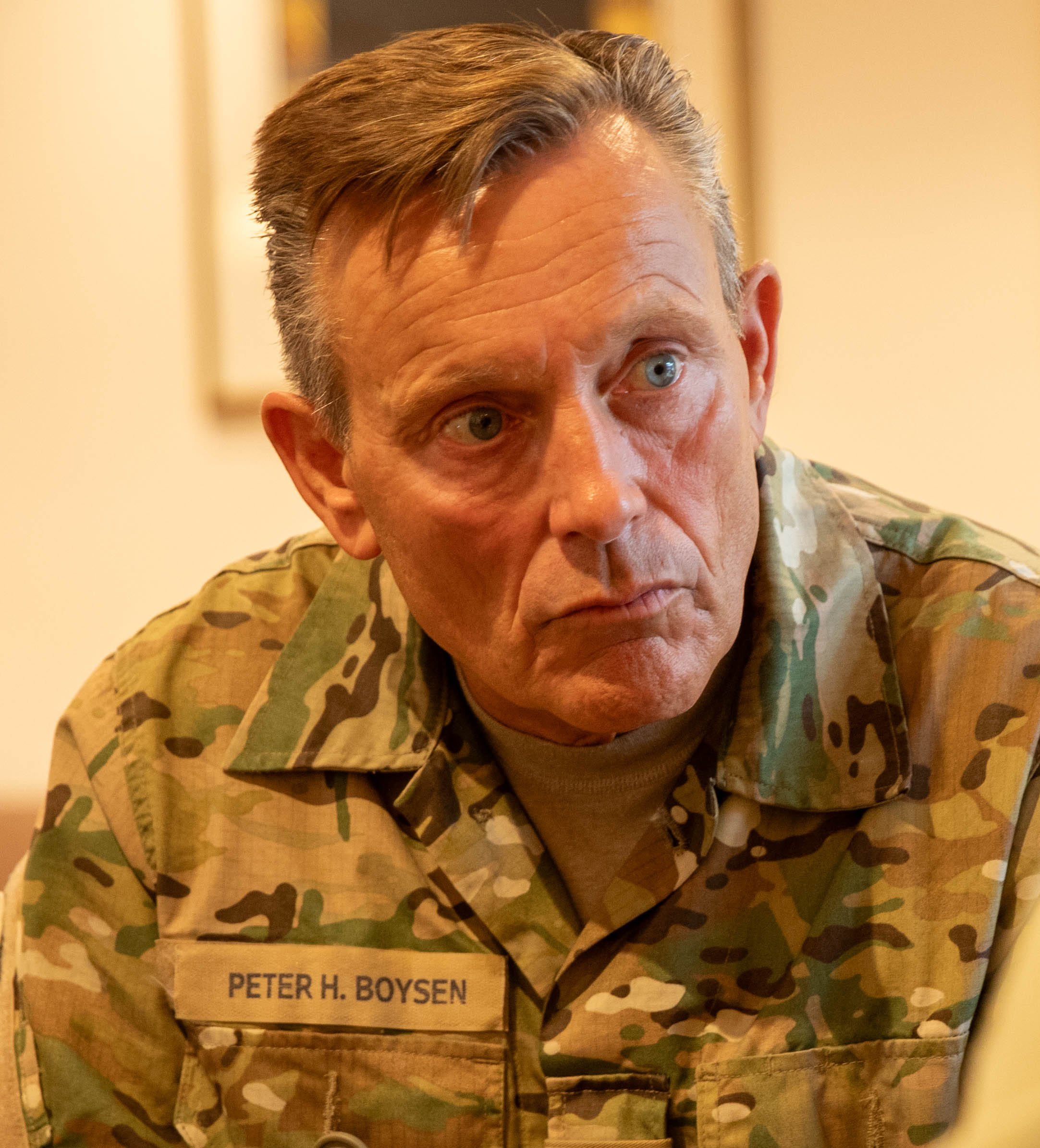
- Incumbent; Peter Harling Boysen since 1 May 2024
- Royal Danish Army
- Member of: Defence Command of Denmark
- Reports to: Chief of Defence
- Term length: No fixed length
- Precursor: Chief of the Army Operational Command
- Formation: 1 April 1923 (historical); 1 October 2014 (current)
- First holder: Ellis Wolff as Chief of the General Command
- Deputy: Deputy Chief of the Army Command
- Salary: kr. 90,000 (Note: Based on Hans-Christian Mathiesen's salary while on administrative leave.) per month (US$ 14,308)
- Website: www2.forsvaret.dk/haerstaben

The chief of the Army Command is the service chief of the Royal Danish Army. The current chief is major general Peter Harling Boysen.

== History ==
From the time that absolutism was instituted in 1660 until around 1800, the monarch had absolute control of the military. Commands of armies could be delegated to designated generals in times of war. As such, general commands would occasionally be established in Norway and the Duchies. During the Scanian War and the Great Northern War there were a total of 19 Supreme Generals, as the commanders served at the King's pleasure.

In the beginning of the English Wars, Crown Prince Frederick established general commands throughout Denmark. (Note: Except for Zealand, where Frederick remained in control.) Initially, they had limited power and were planned to be disbanded after the war, it was however decided to keep them. Following the ascension of Christian VIII, the general commands' power and authority were expanded to exceed real military control. This led to a change in the overall command structure, as the field commanders and chiefs of the general commands held the same authority. This problem came to light during the First Schleswig War and the appointment of Hans Hedemann as the commander of the field army (Danish: Nørrejyske Armékorps). Since Hedemann did not have any control within general command areas, there were often conflicts between him and the chiefs of those commands. On 27 March 1849, Gerhard Christoph von Krogh who earlier had replaced Hedemann, was named supreme commander of "the entire active Army and over the fortifications and batteries in Jutland, on Als and on Funen as well as army magazines and depots set up in those areas". Additionally, it was stipulated that "the active army in all respects was to be independent of the General Commands, which [...] were to assist the army when it was either wholly or partly in the General Command District. While this arrangement ensured there would be no conflict between the supreme commander and the general commands, there were still no unified peacetime commander.

From 1855, there were 3 general commands; 1st General Command responsible for Zealand and surrounding islands, 2nd General Command for North Jutland, Funen and Schleswig, and 3rd General Command for Holstein and Saxe-Lauenburg. Following the loss of the duchies in the Second Schleswig War, 3rd General Command was disbanded and 2nd General Command area was reduced. In the 1905 Defence Agreement, it was decided that the chief of the 1st General Command would act as Army Commander-in-Chief in case of war.

With the 1922 Defence Agreement, the Army was subjugated to large cuts. As a result, 1st and 2nd General Command were merged to create the General Command, and thereby creating the first unified peacetime army commander.

With the creation of the Defence Staff and Chief of Defence, the General Command was replaced by the Army Command. After the Army Command was subjugated to the Defence Command in 1976, the Army Command was replaced by the Army Staff. In 1982, the title of Chief of the Army was changed to become Inspector of the Army. Following the 1988 Defence Commission, it was decided that the Army Staff and the positions of Inspector would be removed and then create the Army Operational Command. Following the Danish Defence Agreement 2013–17, the Army Operational Command was disbanded and reorganised into the Army Staff. As part of the Danish Defence Agreement 2018–23, the Danish name was changed Army Command.

== List of chiefs ==
=== Supreme Generals (1848–1932) ===
First Schleswig War

No.	Portrait	Name (Birth–Death)	Term of office			Ref.
No.	Portrait	Name (Birth–Death)	Took office	Left office	Time in office	Ref.
1		Major general Gerhard Christoph von Krogh (1785–1860)	27 March 1849	12 April 1849	16 days	
2		Major general Frederik Bülow (1791–1858)	12 April 1849	24 May 1849	42 days	
(1)		Major general Gerhard Christoph von Krogh (1785–1860)	24 May 1849	2 July 1850	1 year, 39 days	

Second Schleswig War

No.	Portrait	Name (Birth–Death)	Term of office			Ref.
No.	Portrait	Name (Birth–Death)	Took office	Left office	Time in office	Ref.
1	Christian de Meza	Christian de Meza (1792–1865)	25 December 1863	6 February 1864	43 days	
–	Mathias Lüttichau	Mathias Lüttichau (1795–1870); Acting	6 February 1864	28 February 1864	23 days	
2	Georg Gerlach	Georg Gerlach (1797–1865)	29 February 1864	4 July 1864	125 days	
3	Peter Frederik Steinmann	Peter Frederik Steinmann (1812–1894)	4 July 1864	1 November 1864	150 days	

World War I

No.	Portrait	Name (Birth–Death)	Term of office			Ref.
No.	Portrait	Name (Birth–Death)	Took office	Left office	Time in office	Ref.
1		Lieutenant general Vilhelm Gørtz (1852–1939)	1 August 1914	3 August 1917	3 years, 2 days	
2		Lieutenant general August Tuxen (1853–1929)	6 August 1917	5 May 1918	272 days	
3		Lieutenant general Ellis Wolff (1856–1938)	5 May 1918	31 March 1919	330 days	

=== Chief of the General Command (1923–1926) ===
No.	Portrait	Name (Birth–Death)	Term of office			Ref.
No.	Portrait	Name (Birth–Death)	Took office	Left office	Time in office	Ref.
1	Ellis Wolff [da]	Lieutenant general Ellis Wolff (1856–1938)	1 April 1923	19 October 1926	3 years, 183 days	
2	Anders Gjedde Nyholm	Lieutenant general Anders Gjedde Nyholm (1861–1939)	20 October 1926	31 July 1931	4 years, 303 days	
3	Erik With [da]	Lieutenant general Erik With (1869–1959)	1 August 1931	1 December 1939	8 years, 122 days	
4	William Wain Prior	Lieutenant general William Wain Prior (1876–1946)	1 December 1939	28 August 1941	1 year, 270 days	
5	Ebbe Gørtz [da]	Lieutenant general Ebbe Gørtz (1886–1976)	29 August 1941	30 September 1950	9 years, 32 days	

=== Chief of the Army Command (1950–1970) ===
No.	Portrait	Name (Birth–Death)	Term of office			Ref.
No.	Portrait	Name (Birth–Death)	Took office	Left office	Time in office	Ref.
1	Ebbe Gørtz [da]	Lieutenant general Ebbe Gørtz (1886–1976)	1 October 1950	3 July 1951	275 days	
2	Erik C.V. Møller [da]	Lieutenant general Erik C.V. Møller (1896–1972)	4 July 1951	30 June 1957	5 years, 362 days	
3	Viggo Hjalf [da]	Lieutenant general Viggo Hjalf (1900–1985)	1 July 1957	30 June 1960	2 years, 365 days	
4	Valdemar Jacobsen	Lieutenant general Valdemar Jacobsen (1902–1987)	1 July 1960	31 July 1967	7 years, 30 days	
5	Otto Blixenkrone-Møller [da]	Lieutenant general Otto Blixenkrone-Møller (1912–2006)	1 August 1967	31 December 1969	2 years, 152 days	

=== Chief of the Army Staff (1970–1990) ===
No.	Portrait	Name (Birth–Death)	Term of office			Ref.
No.	Portrait	Name (Birth–Death)	Took office	Left office	Time in office	Ref.
Chief of the Army (Chefen for Hæren)
1	Otto Blixenkrone-Møller [da]	Lieutenant general Otto Blixenkrone-Møller (1912–2006)	1 January 1970	30 November 1972	2 years, 334 days	
2	Christian Vegger [da]	Major general Christian Vegger (1915–1992)	1 December 1972	30 November 1975	2 years, 364 days	
3	Harald Martin Hermann Boysen	Major general Harald Martin Hermann Boysen (1922–2019)	1 December 1975	30 June 1982	6 years, 211 days	
Inspector of the Army (Inspektøren for Hæren)
1	Harald Martin Hermann Boysen	Major general Harald Martin Hermann Boysen (1922–2019)	1 July 1982	1987	4–5 years	
2	Jørgen Christian Essemann	Major general Jørgen Christian Essemann (born 1933)	1987	1990	2–3 years	
3	Kjeld Hillingsø	Major general Kjeld Hillingsø (born 1935)	1990	31 December 1990	0 years	

=== Chief of the Army Operational Command (1991–2014) ===
No.	Portrait	Name (Birth–Death)	Term of office			Ref.
No.	Portrait	Name (Birth–Death)	Took office	Left office	Time in office	Ref.
1	Kjeld Hillingsø	Major general Kjeld Hillingsø (born 1935)	1 January 1991	1993	1–2 years	
2	Ole Larsen Kandborg	Major general Ole Larsen Kandborg (born 1941)	1993	1997	3–4 years	
3	Gustav Grüner	Major general Gustav Grüner (born 1944)	1997	1998	0–1 years	
4	Hans Jesper Helsø	Major general Hans Jesper Helsø (born 1948)	1998	27 September 2000	1–2 years	
5	Jan Scharling	Major general Jan Scharling (born 1946)	27 September 2000	27 September 2002	2 years, 0 days	
6	Poul Kiærskou [da]	Major general Poul Kiærskou (born 1954)	27 September 2002	14 January 2009	6 years, 109 days	
7	Niels Henrik Bundsgaard	Major general Niels Henrik Bundsgaard (born 1957)	15 January 2009	30 June 2010	1 year, 166 days	
8	Agner Rokos [da]	Major general Agner Rokos (born 1958)	1 July 2010	31 March 2013	2 years, 273 days	
9	Per Ludvigsen [da]	Major general Per Ludvigsen (born 1957)	1 April 2013	1 October 2014	1 year, 183 days	

=== Chief of the Army Staff (2014–2018) ===
No.	Portrait	Name (Birth–Death)	Term of office			Ref.
No.	Portrait	Name (Birth–Death)	Took office	Left office	Time in office	Ref.
1	Hans-Christian Mathiesen	Major general Hans-Christian Mathiesen (born 1965)	1 October 2014	24 October 2018	4 years, 23 days	
–	Keld Robert Christensen	Colonel; Keld Robert Christensen (born 1963); Acting	24 October 2018	31 December 2018	68 days	

=== Chief of the Army Command (2019–present) ===
No.	Portrait	Name (Birth–Death)	Term of office			Ref.
No.	Portrait	Name (Birth–Death)	Took office	Left office	Time in office	Ref.
—		Colonel; Keld Robert Christensen (born 1963) acting	1 January 2019	31 January 2019	30 days	
—		Major general Kenneth Pedersen (born 1968) acting	31 January 2019	1 September 2019	213 days	
1		Major general Michael Lollesgaard (born 1960)	1 September 2019	1 April 2021	1 year, 212 days	
—		Major general Gunner Arpe Nielsen (born 1967)	1 April 2021	15 May 2021	44 days	
2		Major general Gunner Arpe Nielsen (born 1967)	15 May 2021	1 May 2024	2 years, 352 days	
3		Major general Peter Harling Boysen (born 1963)	1 May 2024	Incumbent	2 years, 142 days	

== See also ==
- Chief of Defence (Denmark)
- Chief of the Royal Danish Navy
- Chief of the Royal Danish Air Force
