= Army Command (Denmark) =

- Hærkommandoen
- Coat of Arms of the Army Staff
- Active: 1951–1976; 1 January 2019; 7 years ago
- Country: Kingdom of Denmark
- Branch: (Danish Realm) Royal Danish Army
- Size: 90
- Part of: Defence Command
- Headquarters: Karup
- Nickname: HST
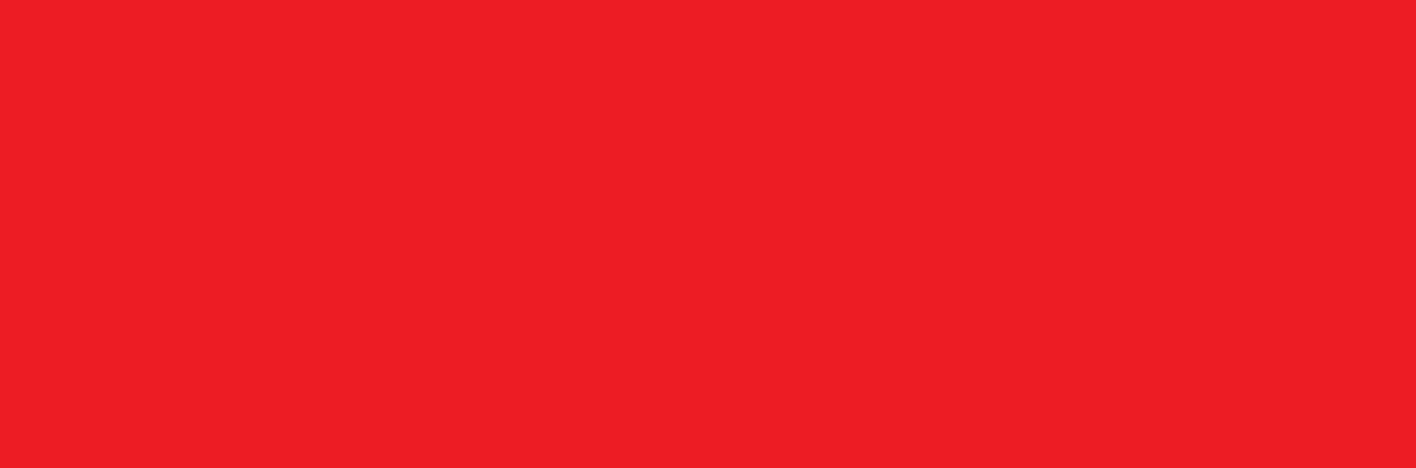
- Stable belt
- Website: Official Website

Commanders
- Chief of the Army Command: Major General Michael Lollesgaard

The Army Command is the Royal Danish Army's top authority, and directly under the Defence Command. Originally created as the Army Staff, as part of the Danish Defence Agreement 2013–17, which called for major restructuring within the Danish military. It is the successor to Army Operational Command. On 1 January 2019, as part of the Danish Defence Agreement 2018–23, the name was changed to Army Command.

== Army Command structure 2020 ==
- Army Command, in Karup
  - Multinational Division North, in Ādaži (Latvia)
  - 1st Brigade, in Holstebro
  - 2nd Brigade, in Slagelse
  - Danish Artillery Regiment, in Oksbøl
  - Engineer Regiment, in Skive
  - Signal Regiment, in Fredericia
  - Train Regiment, in Aalborg
  - Intelligence Regiment, in Varde
  - Royal Life Guards, in Høvelte
  - Guard Hussar Regiment, in Slagelse
  - Jutland Dragoon Regiment, in Holstebro
  - Schleswig Foot Regiment, in Haderslev

== Leadership ==
=== Chief of the Army Command (1950–1970) ===
No.	Portrait	Name (Birth–Death)	Term of office			Ref.
No.	Portrait	Name (Birth–Death)	Took office	Left office	Time in office	Ref.
1	Ebbe Gørtz [da]	Lieutenant general Ebbe Gørtz (1886–1976)	1 October 1950	3 July 1951	275 days	
2	Erik C.V. Møller [da]	Lieutenant general Erik C.V. Møller (1896–1972)	4 July 1951	30 June 1957	5 years, 362 days	
3	Viggo Hjalf [da]	Lieutenant general Viggo Hjalf (1900–1985)	1 July 1957	30 June 1960	2 years, 365 days	
4	Valdemar Jacobsen	Lieutenant general Valdemar Jacobsen (1902–1987)	1 July 1960	31 July 1967	7 years, 30 days	
5	Otto Blixenkrone-Møller [da]	Lieutenant general Otto Blixenkrone-Møller (1912–2006)	1 August 1967	31 December 1969	2 years, 152 days	

=== Chief of the Army Command (2019–present) ===
No.	Portrait	Name (Birth–Death)	Term of office			Ref.
No.	Portrait	Name (Birth–Death)	Took office	Left office	Time in office	Ref.
–	Keld Robert Christensen	Colonel; Keld Robert Christensen (born 1963); Acting	1 January 2019	31 January 2019	30 days	
–	Kenneth Pedersen [da]	Major general Kenneth Pedersen (born 1968); Acting	31 January 2019	1 September 2019	213 days	
1	Michael Lollesgaard [de]	Major general Michael Lollesgaard (born 1960)	1 September 2019	1 April 2021	1 year, 212 days	
–	Gunner Arpe Nielsen [da]	Brigadier general Gunner Arpe Nielsen (born 1967); Acting	1 April 2021	15 May 2021	44 days	
2	Gunner Arpe Nielsen [da]	Major general Gunner Arpe Nielsen (born 1967)	15 May 2021	1 May 2024	2 years, 352 days	
3		Major general Peter Harling Boysen (born 1963)	1 May 2024	Incumbent	2 years, 20 days	
