= 1st Danish Artillery Battalion =

- 1. Danske Artilleriafdeling
- Active: 28 February 2014 (1684)
- Country: Kingdom of Denmark
- Branch: Royal Danish Army
- Size: 500
- Part of: Army Combat and Fire Support Center
- Garrison/HQ: Oksbøl
- Nickname(s): 1DAA
- Motto(s): Ingen tvivl, ingen tøven (No doubt, no hesitation)
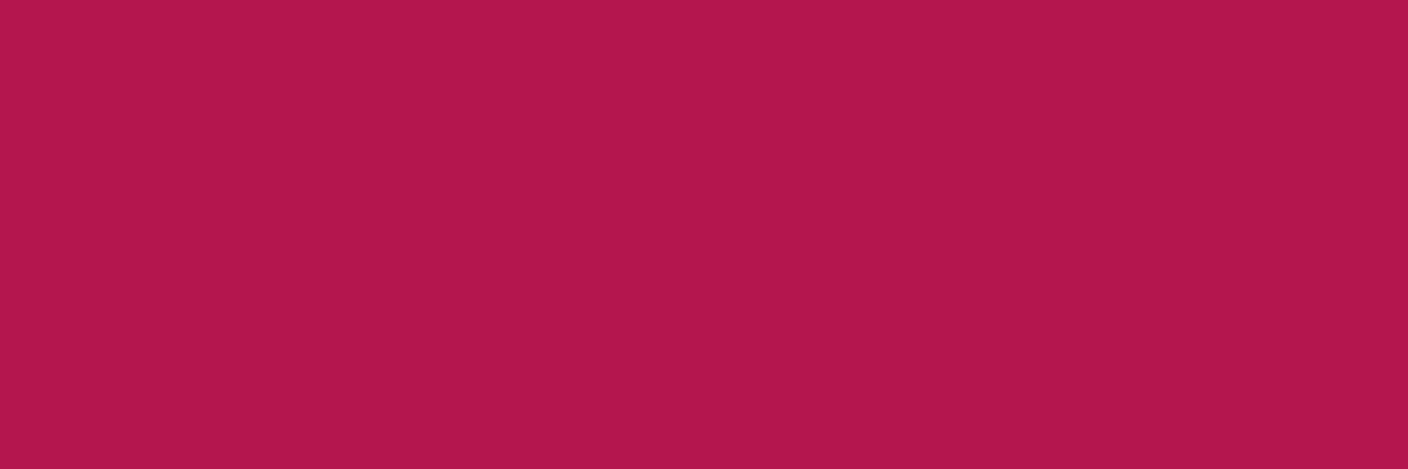
- Regimental belt
- Mascot(s): Saint Barbara
- Engagements: First Schleswig War; Battle of Nybøl; Battle of Fredericia; Battle of Isted; Battle of Mysunde (1848); Second Schleswig War; Battle of Mysunde (1864); Battle of Dybbøl

Commanders
- Current commander: Lieutenant Colonel Poul-Erik Andersen
- Ceremonial chief: HM The King
- Colonel of the Regiment: Ole Bering

The 1st Danish Artillery Battalion (Danish: 1. Danske Artilleriafdeling, 1DAA) is a part of Army Combat and Fire Support Center and was created after under the Danish Defence Agreement 2013-2017, after the Danish Artillery Regiment was disbanded. It is the only remaining military unit in the Danish Army that is involved with artillery, and is therefore the bearer of the traditions of the former regiment and can trace its roots back to 1684.

The battalion is divided into a number of batteries with around 500 personnel in total.

1 DAA provides fielding and training of the army's ability to plan, deploy, manage and operate fire-support such as howitzer and heavy mortars at different tactical levels.

On 1 January 2019, 1 DAA was merged back into the reactivated Danish Artillery Regiment as 1st Artillery Battalion (1AA).

== See also ==
- Royal Danish Army
- Danish Artillery Regiment
- Equipment of the Royal Danish Army
- Military of Denmark
