= South Jutland Artillery Regiment =

Southern Jutland Artillery Regiment
- Sønderjyske Artilleriregiment
- Active: 1951 – 2000
- Disbanded: 2000
- Country: Denmark
- Branch: Royal Danish Army
- Nickname: SJAR
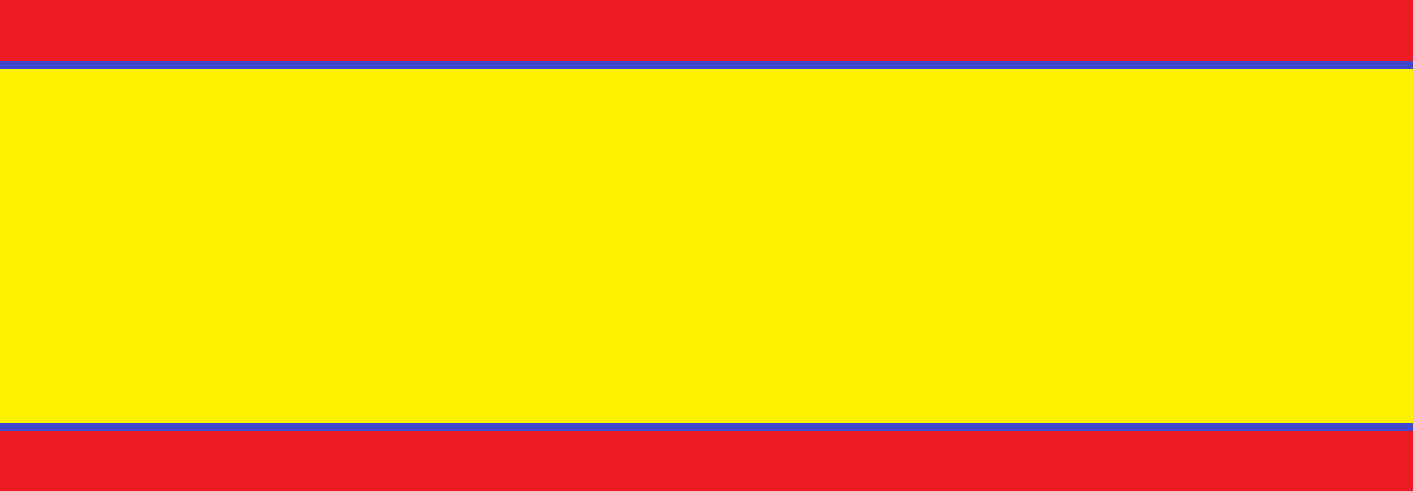
- Regimental belt

The Southern Jutland Artillery Regiment (Danish: Sønderjyske Artilleriregiment) was an artillery regiment of the Royal Danish Army. The regiment was established on November 1, 1951 as 4 Field Artillery Regiment in Aarhus. The regiment is based on the 7th Artillery Battalion of 3 Field Artillery Regiment, and the regiment can thus trace its history back to 1842.

On 23 October 1953 The regiment was transferred to the new build barracks in Varde

Between 1953 and 2000 various units was transferred back and forward, between Nørrerjyske Artilleriregiment and Southern Jutland Artillery Regiment. Including 6th Artillery Battalion there first was in Varde from 1969 to 1974 and then again from 1987 to 1989.

On 20 February 1974, the Artillery NCO School in Ringsted and Artillery School on Amager was merged into the new Army Firesupport School and collocated with Southern Jutland Artillery Regiment in Varde.

On 1 November 2000 it was merged with the North Jutland Artillery Regiment to form the Queen's Artillery Regiment at the barracks in Varde.

== Units ==
- 7th Armoured Artillery Battalion, part of 3rd Jutland Brigade
- 14th Anti Air Artillery Battalion (1990-2000) part of Jutland Division Artillery, Transferred from Nørrerjyske Artilleriregiment
- 10th Light Artillery Battalion, part of Military region III
- 11th Light Artillery Battalion, part of Military region IV
- 24th Artillery Battalion part of Jutland Division Artillery
- Staff and Target Acquisition Battery/JDIV(1982-2000) part of Jutland Division Artillery, Transferred from Nørrerjyske Artilleriregiment

== Names of the regiment ==
Names
4. Feltartilleriregiment	4th Field Artillery Regiment	1951	–	1961
Sønderjyske Artilleriregiment	Southern Jutland Artillery Regiment	1961	–	2000
