= Intelligence Regiment (Denmark) =

- Efterretningregimentet
- Coat of arms
- Active: 1 March 2014
- Country: Denmark
- Branch: Royal Danish Army
- Type: Army intelligence
- Role: Civil–military co-operation Counterintelligence; Electronic warfare HUMINT; ISTAR; Military intelligence Psychological warfare
- Size: 457
- Part of: Army Staff
- Garrison/HQ: Varde
- Nickname: EFR
- Motto: Viden er styrke (Knowledge is strength)
- Website: Official website

Commanders
- Ceremonial chief: HM The King
- Colonel of the Regiment: Morten Birch Jensen

Insignia
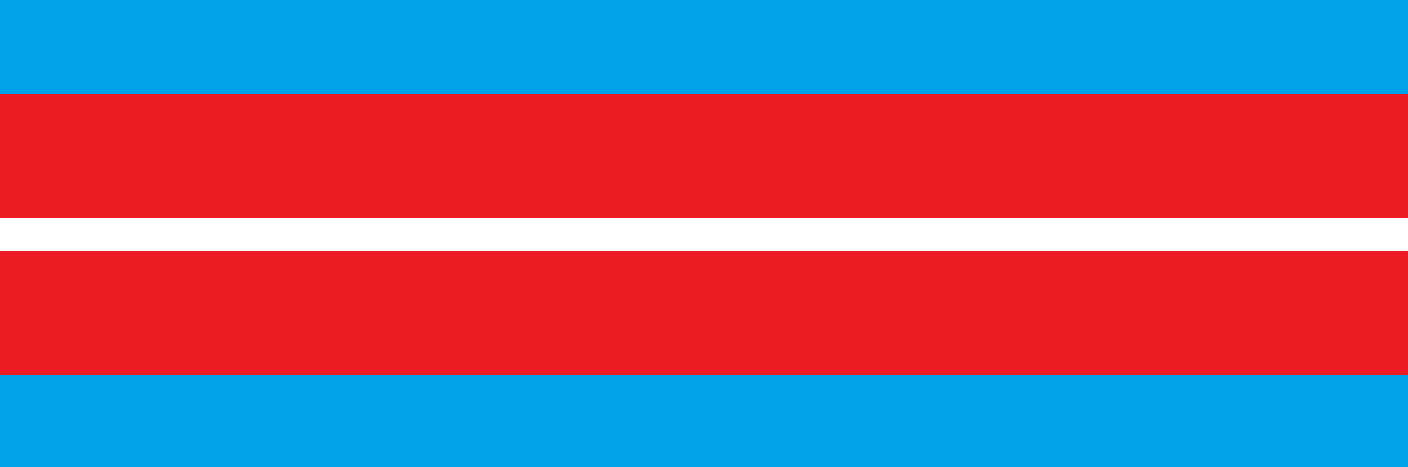
- Regimental belt

- Colours

The Intelligence Regiment (Danish: Efterretningsregimentet, EFR) is an army intelligence regiment of the Royal Danish Army.

It was originally created as the Army Intelligence Centre (Danish: Hærens Efterretnings Center), and was a collection of all intelligence units, created by the Danish Defence Agreement 2013-2017 on the basis of lessons learned in Afghanistan and Iraq.

Following the Danish Defence Agreement 2018–23, the centre was upgraded to a regiment and the name was changed.

== Structure ==
Today the Intelligence Regiment has 2 battalions:

- 1 Intelligence, Surveillance & Reconnaissance Battalion
  - HQ Platoon
  - UAS Company
  - EW Company, physically placed at Ryes Kaserne in Fredericia
- 2 Military Intelligence Battalion
  - Intelligence Fusion Centre
  - SERE section
  - Human Interaction Company (PSYOPS, CIMIC & HUMINT)
  - Infantry (training) Company

== Names of the regiment ==
Names
Hærens Efterretnings Center	Army Intelligence Centre	2014-04-01	–	2018-12-31
Efterretningsregimentet	Intelligence Regiment	2019-01-01	–
