= Army Combat and Fire Support Centre =

- Hærens Kamp- og Ildstøttecenter
- Active: 3 March 2014–1 January 2019
- Country: Denmark
- Branch: Royal Danish Army
- Size: 520
- Part of: Army Staff
- Garrison/HQ: Oksbøl
- Nickname: HKIC
- Motto: Styrke ved kvalitet (Strength in quality)
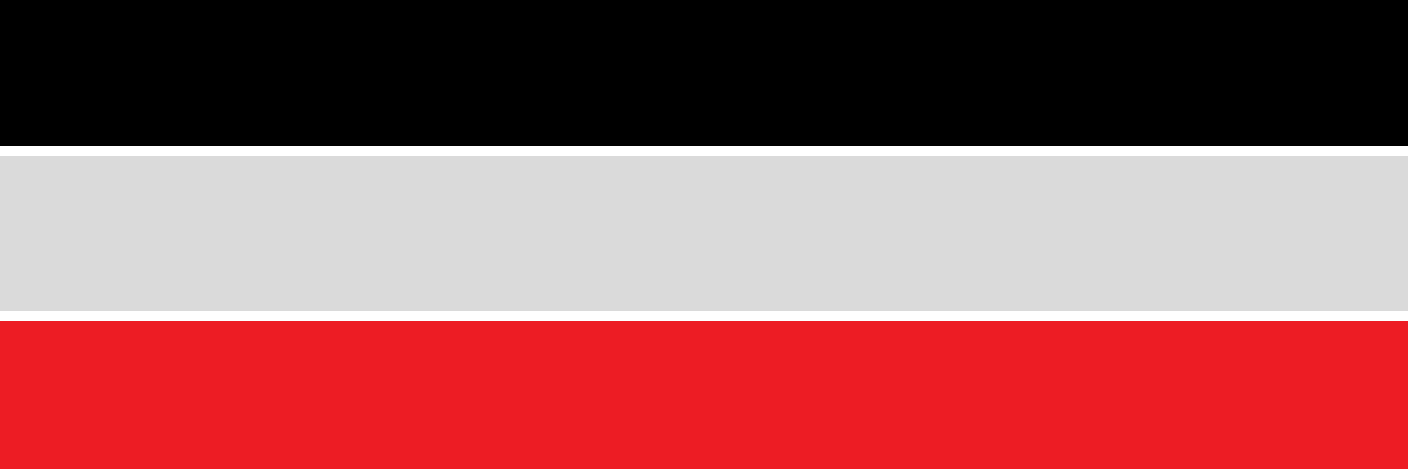
- Stable belt
- Website: Official Website

Commanders
- Current commander: Colonel Ole Bering

The Army Combat and Fire Support Centre (Danish: Hærens Kamp- og Ildstøttecenter), formerly Army Combat School (Danish: Hærens Kampskole), was a training centre for the Royal Danish Army, with the purpose of developing, educating and training various forms of combat for infantry, armor, reconnaissance and fire support.

== History ==
The centre could trace its history back to 1869, when the Shooting School was created, placed at Panterens Bastion in Christianshavn. In 1922 it changed name to Shooting School for Handguns. In 1943 as part of Operation Safari, German forces tried to access the armory at the school, which resulted in a firefight and 3 dead Germans.

In 1961 the school changed name to the Infantry School. On 1 March 1974, the Infantry School was amalgamated with the Infantry's Reserveofficer's School and the Armored School in Øksbøl, and was renamed Army Combat School.

In 2014 due to the Danish Defence Agreement 2013-2017, the Army Combat School saw restructuring as parts of the Danish Artillery Regiment were transferred into the school, named 1st Danish Artillery Battalion. It was originally set to be named Army Combat Support Centre, however after a political and logistical discussion, parts of Army Combat Centre were transferred and it was then renamed Army Combat and Fire Support Centre. In 2019, as part of the Danish Defence Agreement 2018–23, the Army Combat and Fire Support Centre was closed, and its assets moved to the revived Danish Artillery Regiment.
