= Operation Arctic Endurance =

European military exercise in Greenland

- Part of the Greenland crisis
- Status of Operation Arctic Endurance, as of 29 January 2026 United States Greenland Participants Rest of NATO
- Type: Military exercise
- Location: Kingdom of Denmark; Greenland
- Planned by: Kingdom of Denmark; Denmark; Greenland
- Commanded by: (Danish Realm) Mette Frederiksen; (Danish Realm) Peter Harling Boysen; (Greenland) Jens-Frederik Nielsen
- Objective: Deterrence against a US invasion of Greenland, and strengthening arctic capabilities.
- Date: January 2026 – present (8 or 9 months)
- Executed by: Denmark; Belgium; Estonia; Finland; France; Germany; Iceland; Netherlands; Norway; Slovenia; Sweden; United Kingdom
- Outcome: Indecisive

Operation Arctic Endurance is a 2026 military exercise led by the Kingdom of Denmark in its autonomous territory of Greenland, officially to counter potential Russian activity. Its real purpose was as a tripwire force to make any invasion politically costly, as a deterrent against the United States invading Greenland during the Greenland crisis, according to outside analysts and later sources in the Danish government and Danish and foreign militaries.

In response to United States president Donald Trump's ongoing threats of invading or annexing Greenland, a number of European NATO states began deploying military planning staff to the island, concentrated in the capital, Nuuk. Major-General Søren Andersen, commander of the Joint Arctic Command (JACMD; Arktisk Kommando), stated at the time the exercise was focused on preparing for future increased Russian activity, not defending against US military threats.

By 19 January, Denmark sent 200 soldiers to Greenland to reinforce JACMD permanent personnel, later announcing that a "substantial contribution" of its armed forces would follow. By 20 January, more soldiers arrived, together with Major General Peter Harling Boysen, Chief of the Royal Danish Army, who said he was ready to defend Greenland. Danish troops also brought a contingency stock of live ammunition, demolitions for destroying runways, and blood for transfusions in case of a "worst case scenario" of combat against invading US forces.

On 21 January, in a speech at the World Economic Forum in Davos, Switzerland, Trump officially changed his position from possibly using military force to obtain Greenland, to ruling out the use of military force; this is consistent with Trump's position on his proposed annexation of Canada. Trump also cancelled the retaliatory tariffs he had announced on participating countries before they could take effect.

According to the Danish Defence, the operation will last throughout 2026, while the Danish Government announced that the deployment might remain in Greenland for one to two years.

== Background ==
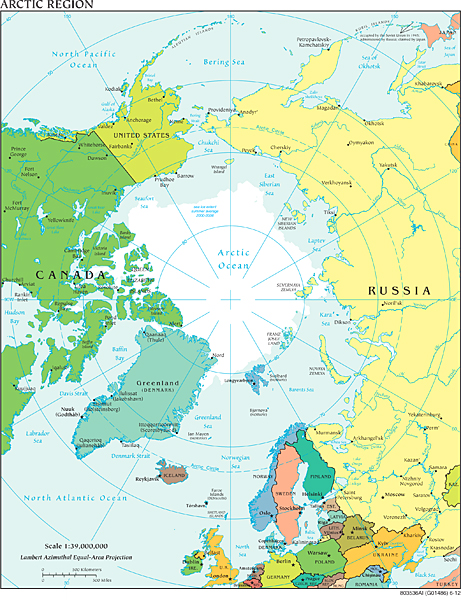
Arctic region

Since early in his second term, US president Donald Trump has said that the United States should annex Greenland from the Kingdom of Denmark. President Trump has expressed a desire for the US to purchase the territory, although Denmark and Greenland have said Greenland is not for sale. In response, Trump has refused to rule out the use of force to acquire the territory.

== Deployment ==
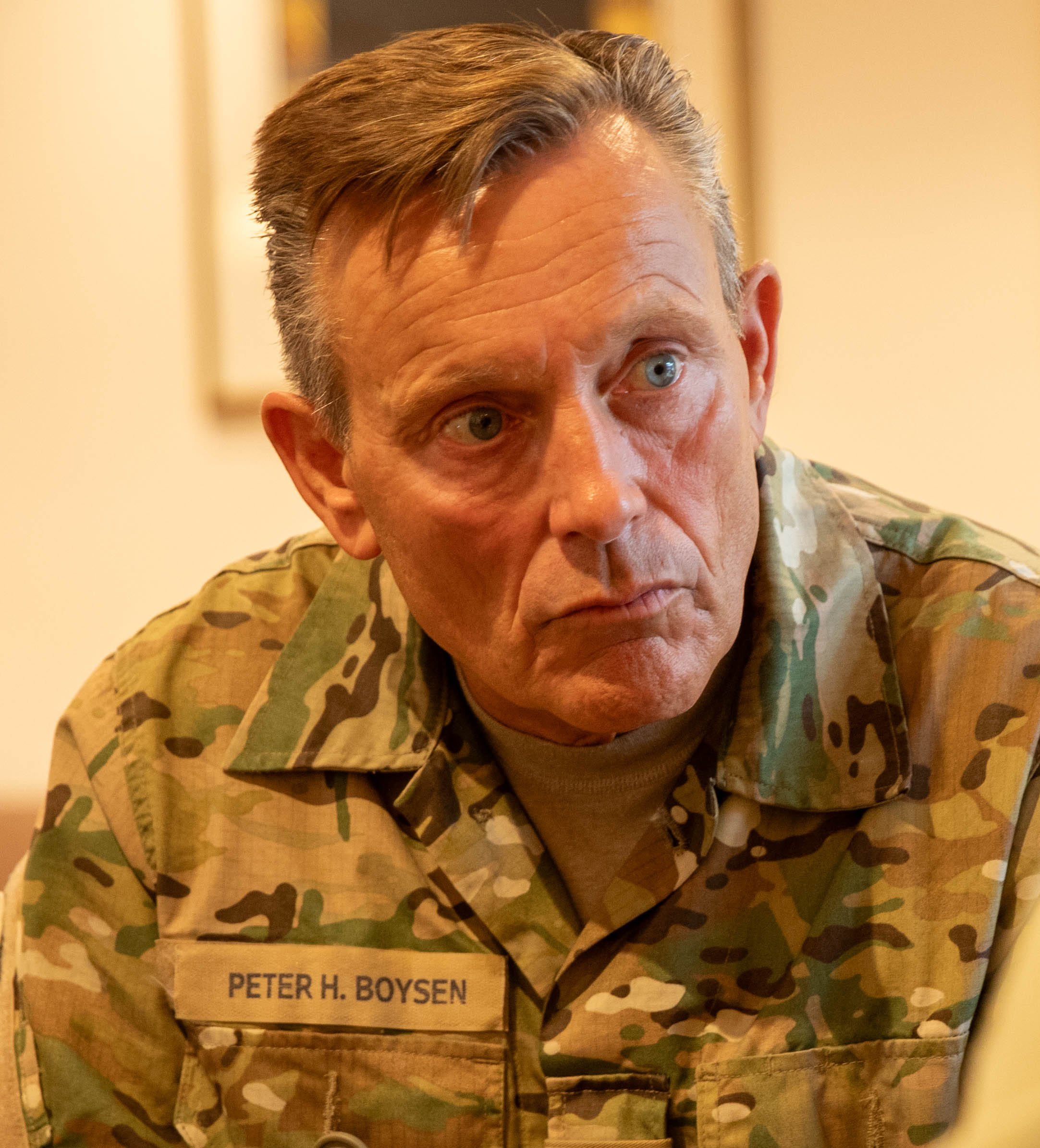
Major General Peter Harling Boysen, the Chief of the Royal Danish Army, arrived in Greenland with a substantial force on 19–20 January. Boysen has extensive experience from international warzones and special operations, and said he was ready to defend Greenland.

On 15 January 2026, in response to the threats, a number of European NATO states such as France, Germany, and Sweden sent military personnel to Greenland for joint military exercises to demonstrate readiness to defend the island. By 19 January, Denmark had sent 200 additional soldiers to Greenland. On that day, Denmark announced a substantial additional troop deployment to Greenland to arrive shortly. Later that day more combat troops together with the Chief of the Royal Danish Army, General Peter Boysen, started arriving in Greenland. Boysen, who has extensive experience from international warzones and special operations, said he was ready to defend Greenland if invaded.

Initially deployed were a small number of troops, about thirty personnel; however, the initial military planners, reconnaissance teams, were not intended to deter US action by themselves alone. They were to coordinate the arrival of larger land, sea, and air forces publicly pledged by France, and/or other European states: "as well as providing a show of political support, the European troops were said to be on a short scoping mission, according to one country involved. The aim was to establish what a more sustained ground deployment in Greenland could look like, partly to reassure the US that European NATO members were serious about arctic security". The troops also act as a tripwire force, such that an attack against them would be considered an act of aggression against the European partners and reacted to accordingly.

By the morning of 15 January, the multinational group had gathered at the headquarters of Denmark's Joint Arctic Command in Nuuk "to assess the conditions for a possible wider allied deployment". As of 18 January 2026, over 100 troops were present in Nuuk and over 100 in Kangerlussuaq.

Denmark announced that a new arctic special forces team that is part of the army's Jaeger Corps has been training in "the most demanding conditions" of Greenland since October 2025, and is able to operate anywhere in Greenland.

No troops were deployed to the Faroe Islands, Denmark's other autonomous territory.

=== Belgium ===
Belgium announced on 16 January that the country was sending one officer to participate in the operation.

=== Denmark ===
Denmark had already stationed up to 150 troops in Greenland available to be used for the operation prior to its beginning. They were mostly under the command of the Joint Arctic Command and they have received allied troops upon their mobilization on the island. They are equipped with unspecified numbers of Lockheed C-130 Hercules.

Danish Challenger 604 aircraft fly surveillance missions in the arctic, and since 2021 one aircraft has been permanently stationed in Kangerlussuaq. On early 19 January 2026, it was reported by Danish Major General Søren Andersen that an additional 100 Danish soldiers had arrived in Nuuk, and similar numbers of new soldiers were also deployed in Kangerlussuaq. The Danish broadcaster DR and Swedish TV learned that the Danish troops also brought a contingency stock of live ammunition, transfusion blood and explosives to demolish airfields in case of an unlikely US invasion. DR reported that the Danish air defense frigate HDMS Peter Willemoes also joined the naval part of the operation.

Danish F-35 fighter jets will patrol Greenland from a base on Iceland.

=== Estonia ===
Estonia actively participates in the planning committee of the operation, and suggested possible mobilization of five to ten military personnel if requested by Denmark. Defence Minister Hanno Pevkur stated that Estonian Defence Forces personnel will eventually go to Greenland.

=== Finland ===
Finland announced they would be sending two liaison officers to Greenland. Defense Minister Antti Häkkänen said "Finland has experience operating in Arctic conditions, but Greenland is new territory. That's why we're sending two liaison officers first to find out what it's like there, what the conditions are, and how logistics and other operations can be arranged."

=== France ===
On 15 January 2026, up to 15 French military personnel landed in Greenland. They were drawn from the 27th Mountain Infantry Brigade. President Emmanuel Macron said during his New Year's address to the French Armed Forces, that day, that an "initial team of French soldiers is already on site and will be reinforced in the coming days by land, air and sea assets." According to Joint Arctic Command on 18 January, French special forces were beginning operations in Kangerlussuaq. The French frigate Bretagne also joined the operation.

French Airbus A330 Multi Role Tanker Transport planes accompanied Danish F-35 fighter jets to Greenland, and will continue supporting their operations from Iceland.

=== Germany ===
Germany announced that they would send 15 Bundeswehr soldiers which would be part of a German-led reconnaissance team. The reconnaissance team left Greenland on 18 January, "not due to Trump's tariffs threat but as scheduled" as the departure was already announced before Trump's threats or the troops even left on 14 January.

=== Iceland ===
Iceland sent two members of the Icelandic Coast Guard to help prepare for the exercise.

=== Netherlands ===
Two members of the Netherlands Armed Forces, including a naval officer, were sent to Greenland on 16 January. According to Minister of Defence Ruben Brekelmans, more soldiers would likely be sent to Greenland in the short term.

=== Norway ===
The Norwegian Minister of Defence announced that they had sent two military personnel to Greenland, who would take part in the operations.

=== Slovenia ===
On 17 January, the government of Slovenia deployed two military officers to Greenland.

=== Sweden ===
Sweden sent an unknown number of army officers to Greenland. In February, Sweden sent a group of Air Force Rangers for field exercises in Greenland as part of Arctic Endurance; the Swedish troops, whose speciality is Counter Special Forces Operations (C-SOF) and Combat search and rescue (CSAR) were scheduled to stay in Greenland for a couple of weeks. Personnel from the Swedish Coastal Rangers and fighter squadrons also took part in the deployment.

=== United Kingdom ===
The United Kingdom sent a single military officer to Greenland "at Denmark's request to join a reconnaissance group".

== Non-participating NATO states ==
=== Canada ===
A Department of National Defence spokesperson said on 15 January 2026 that, "as of this moment, the Canadian Armed Forces are not initiating any new operations in Greenland." On 19 January, it was reported that Canada considered sending troops to Greenland to reinforce Danish sovereignty.

=== Italy ===
Defence Minister Guido Crosetto likened the troop numbers involved in the operation to "the start of a joke" and stated that Italy would take a "rational stance" unlike its allies, hinting at the operation being "irrational". In the same statement, he confirmed Italy refused to participate after being asked by Denmark. Prime Minister Giorgia Meloni stated that the operation must be conducted within the framework of NATO, under NATO coordination, and with the involvement of the United States. She added that strengthening defence in the arctic is of fundamental importance but it must involve NATO and the European Union, and only under these conditions will Italy send troops to Greenland. She further said that the operation must not create divisions between NATO and the European Union and must not be perceived as hostile towards the United States.

=== Luxembourg ===
Luxembourg is reported to have "no plans to send troops to Greenland", although the government overall supports the operation politically and stated to be willing to set up a separate diplomatic mission instead. As of 2024, the entire Luxembourg Armed Forces has only 1,197 personnel.

=== Poland ===
On 15 January 2026, Wirtualna Polska reported that Prime Minister Donald Tusk had stated that Poland would not send troops to Greenland.

=== Spain ===
Spain stated it was considering its participation in the operation after its invitation, while not currently being formally part of it.

=== United States ===
The United States was invited to participate in the operation in a NATO meeting, according to Danish officials. As of 25 March 2026, the invitation is still pending.

== Civil invasion preparedness ==
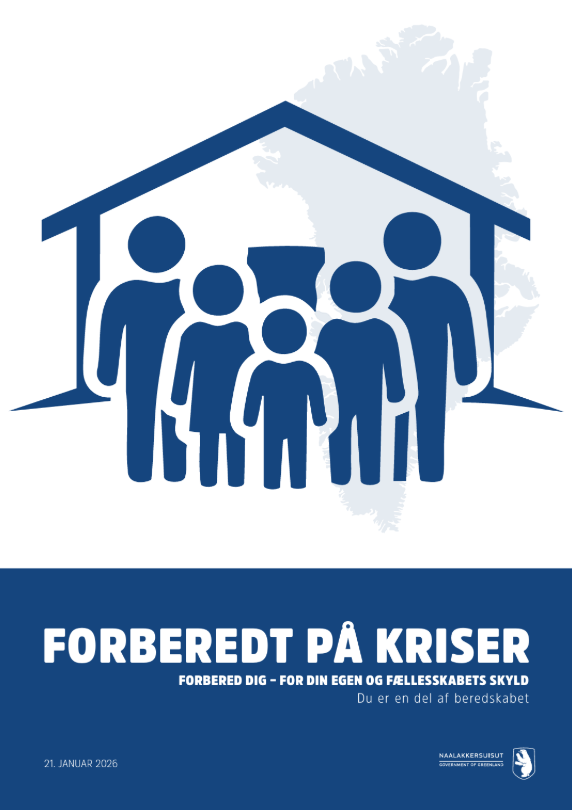
The cover of an emergency manual distributed on 21 January 2026 by the Greenlandic government during the crisis

The government of Greenland asked citizens to prepare for a military attack on Greenland by the US, including by stockpiling supplies adequate for at least five days, including food, medicines, fuel for heating and transportation, communication equipment, and guns, ammunition and fishing equipment. The emergency manual they published also reminded citizens to care for friends and neighbours, especially the vulnerable, and to verify the sources of information.

== US retaliatory tariffs ==
On 17 January 2026, US President Donald Trump posted on Truth Social that "Denmark, Norway, Sweden, France, Germany, The United Kingdom, The Netherlands, and Finland have journeyed to Greenland, for purposes unknown. This is a very dangerous situation for the Safety, Security, and Survival of our Planet." In the post, he went on to announce that all these countries would be subject to 10% tariff on all imports starting on 1 February, increasing to 25% on 1 June. The tariffs would continue "until such time as a Deal is reached for the Complete and Total purchase of Greenland".

=== Response ===
The announcement was condemned by leaders of many European countries and by lawmakers in the US, including some Republicans. In response to the announcement, EU leaders said they would not ratify the EU–US trade agreement which had been negotiated over the past six months. Trump had previously described the agreement as "the biggest deal ever made". On 18 January, EU ambassadors met in Brussels for an emergency meeting, where the possibility of a €93 billion ($108 billion) tariff against the US was discussed. António Costa, who "gives the European Union political direction" as the president of the European Council, said that an "extraordinary meeting" of European leaders will take place in the coming days to address Trump's tariffs.

French President Macron said the "tariff threat" was "unacceptable", and that "no intimidation nor threat will influence us, neither in Ukraine, nor in Greenland". Norwegian prime minister Jonas Gahr Støre condemned the tariff announcement and wrote that "Norway's position is firm: Greenland is part of the Kingdom of Denmark. Norway fully supports the sovereignty of the Kingdom of Denmark." UK prime minister Keir Starmer said that "applying tariffs on allies" was "completely wrong". He added that his government would "be pursuing this directly with the US administration." On 18 January 2026, Italian Prime Minister Giorgia Meloni said the tariffs applied to the nations participating in the operation were a mistake and spoke directly with Trump. She subsequently spoke with Mark Rutte and other European leaders to mediate a misunderstanding among allies. Italy's position as mediator was also confirmed by its foreign minister Antonio Tajani.

=== Cancellation of tariffs ===
On 21 January, after ruling out using military force to take Greenland, Trump also announced that the tariffs would not be imposed after all. He said the US and NATO had agreed a framework solution to Arctic security.

== See also ==
- NATO Arctic Sentry
- NATO Enhanced Forward Presence
