= North Jutland Artillery Regiment =

- Nørrejyske Artilleriregiment
- Active: 1923 – 2000
- Disbanded: 2000
- Country: Denmark
- Branch: Royal Danish Army
- Nickname: NJAR
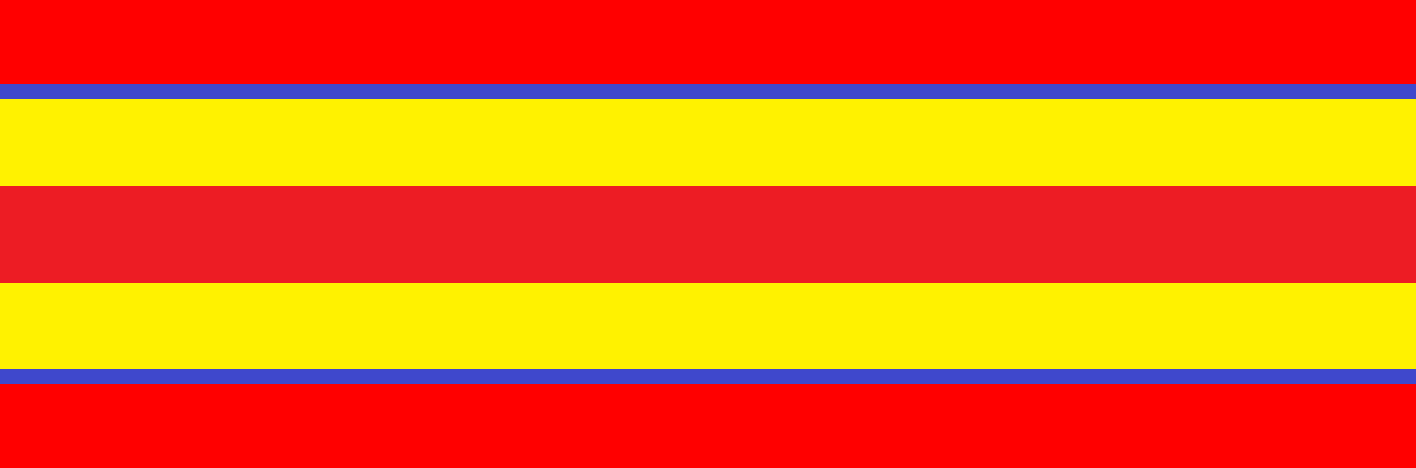
- Regimental belt

The North Jutland Artillery Regiment (Danish: Nørrejyske Artilleriregiment) was an artillery regiment of the Royal Danish Army. The regiment was established in 1923 as 3. Feltartilleriregiment. In 1969 the regiment moved from Århus to new build barracks in Skive. Jutlandic Air Defence Regiment was merged with the regiment on 1 November 1974. On 1 November 2000 it was merged with the Southern Jutland Artillery Regiment to form the Queen's Artillery Regiment.

== Units ==
- 3rd Armoured Artillery Battalion (1961-2000), part of 1st Jutland Brigade
- 6th Armoured Artillery Battalion (1974-1996), part of 2nd Jutland Brigade
- 8th Light Artillery Battalion (1983-2000), part of Jutland Battle Group
- 9th Light Artillery Battalion (1961-1985) - 9th Light Battery(1985-2000), part of Military region II
- 14th Anti Air Artillery Battalion (1974-1982) part of Jutland Division Artillery, Transferred to Southern Jutland Artillery Regiment
- 15th Light Artillery Battalion (1961-1985) - 15th Light Battery(1985-2000), part of Military region I
- 16th Light Artillery Battalion (1990-1996), Transferred from King's Artillery Regiment, part of 4th Battle Group
- 18th Heavy Artillery Battery (1961-1996) - 18th MLRS Battery (1997-2000), part of Jutlands Division Artillery
- 19th Heavy Artillery Battery (1961-1996), part of Jutland Division Artillery
- 23rd Artillery Battalion (1961-2000) part of Jutland Division Artillery
- 33rd Heavy Artillery Battalion (1961-1996) - part of LANDJUT/Corps Artillery
- Staff and Target Acquisition Battery/JDIV(1961-1982) part of Jutland Division Artillery, Transferred to Southern Jutland Artillery Regiment
- 2nd Staff Company/2nd Jutland Brigade. (1976-1996)

== Names of the regiment ==
Names
3. Feltartilleriregiment	3rd Field Artillery Regiment	1923	–	1961
Nørrejyske Artilleriregiment	North Jutland Artillery Regiment	1961	–	2000
