= Tripwire force =

Strategic approach in military deterrence theory

A tripwire force (sometimes called a glass plate) is a strategic approach in deterrence theory whereby a small force is deployed abroad with the assumption that an attack on them will trigger a greater deployment of forces. The deployment of the small force is designed to signal the defending side's commitment to an armed response to future aggression without triggering a security spiral.

Scholars have debated whether tripwires are effective at deterring aggression, with some scholars arguing they are ineffective while others argue they are effective.

== Concept ==
A tripwire force is a military force significantly smaller than the forces of a potential adversary. The tripwire force helps deter aggression through the demonstration of the defending side's commitment to militarily counter an armed attack, even if the tripwire force cannot mount a sustained resistance itself. In the event an attack occurs, it helps defend against the aggressor by slowing the advance of the aggressor's forces to allow the defender time to marshal additional resources. The tripwire force can, in some instances, also be useful in deterring salami attacks.

Because the tripwire force is too small, by itself, to present an offensive threat, it can be deployed without triggering the security dilemma.

The term "glass plate" has been used as a synonym for tripwire force; an attack against the force metaphorically shatters the "glass" between peace and war.

The credibility of a tripwire force is tied to the "force having relevant combat capabilities and being of sufficient size that an adversary could neither sidestep nor capture the force" as well as to the potential of the defender to actually mobilize reserves robust enough to launch a counter-attack in a timely manner.

== Examples ==
=== Examples in practice ===
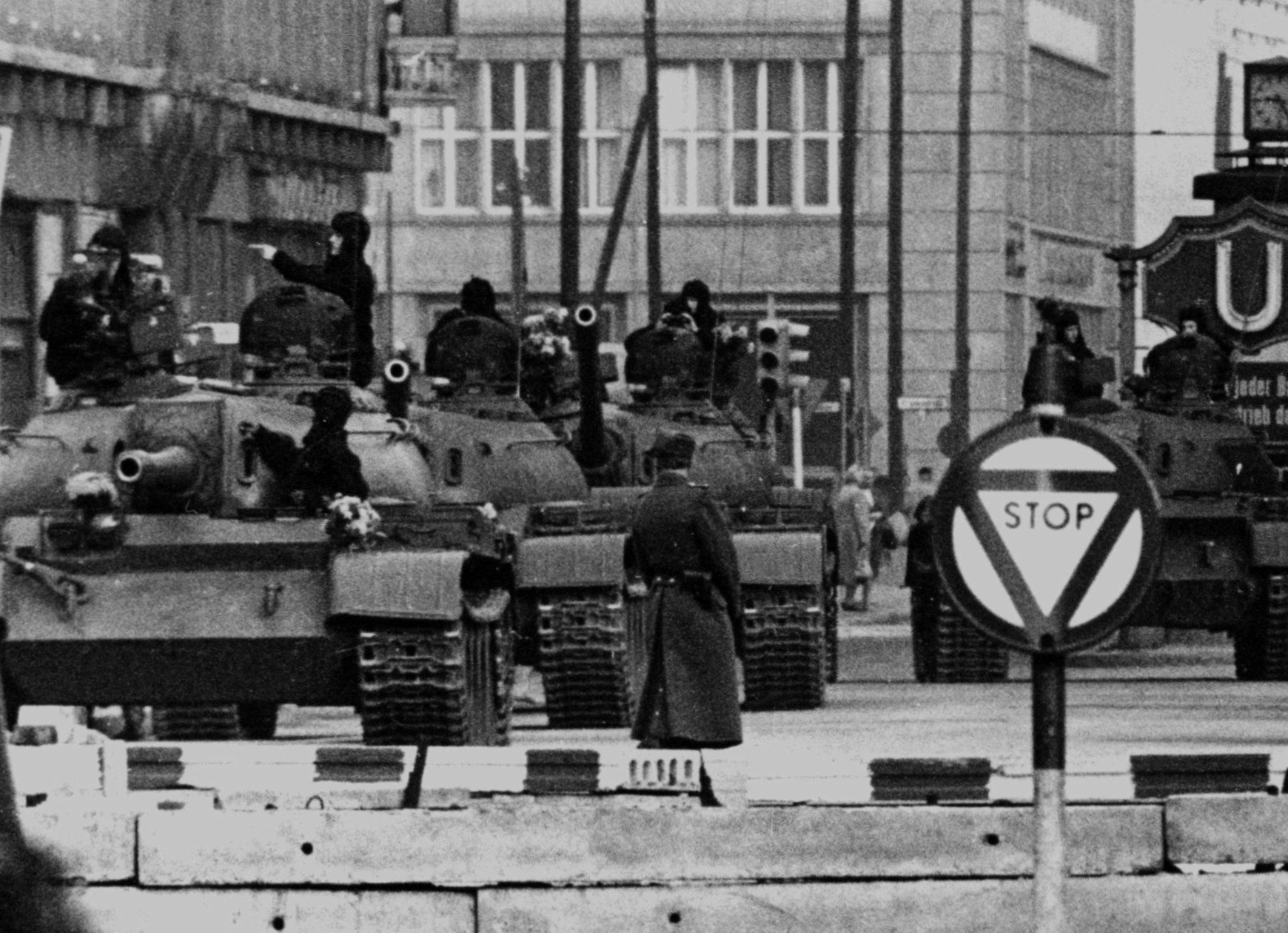
The U.S. Army deployed a tripwire force to Berlin during the Cold War to deter the Soviet Union, whose tanks are pictured here during the Berlin Crisis of 1961.

United States Army Berlin, a U.S. Army formation posted to West Berlin during the Cold War, has been referred to as a tripwire force. Because a limited Soviet incursion into West Berlin, which resulted in no American casualties, might cause the sitting United States President to hesitate in mounting a counter-offensive, the Soviet Union – it was felt by western military planners – would have a strategic incentive to take such an action. By stationing American forces in West Berlin, U.S. casualties would be guaranteed during any future Soviet attack. In this way the United States would deny itself the political ability to abandon the conflict which would, in turn, guarantee a U.S. response up to – and including – the battlefield deployment of nuclear weapons. Realizing this, the Soviet Union would not take offensive action against West Berlin even though it might be militarily capable of doing so.

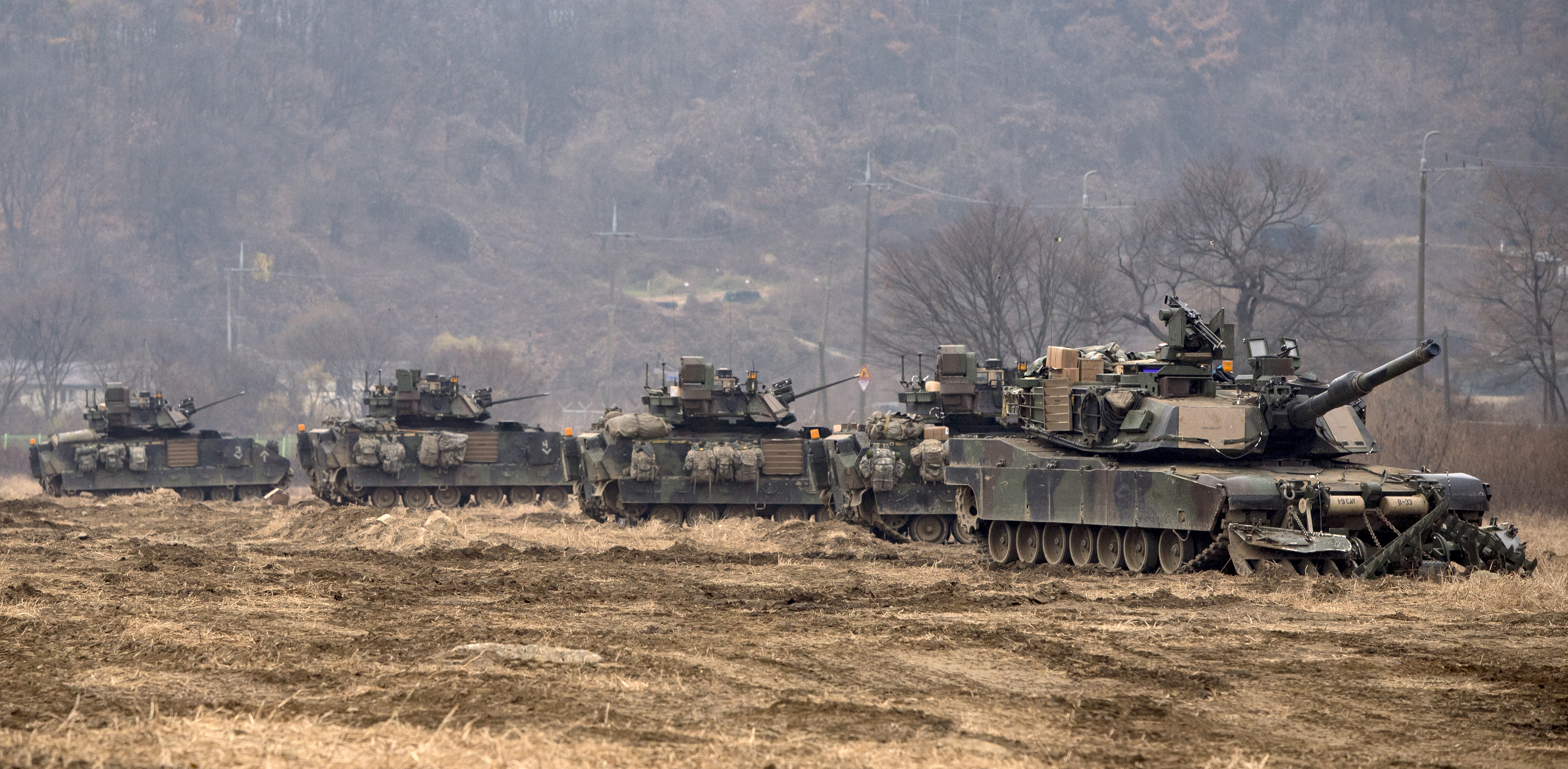
United States Forces Korea (pictured here in 2017) have been described as a tripwire force.

NATO's stance in the larger European theatre was also seen largely as a tripwire, whose primary purpose was to trigger the release of nuclear attacks on the Warsaw Pact. The British 1957 Defence White Paper was based on a detailed look at the British Army of the Rhine's part as a tripwire and concluded it was larger than it needed to be to serve this function. If the force's primary purpose was to simply delay an advance until it became overwhelming and thus indicated a "real war", presumably being destroyed in the process, then a smaller force would work just as well. Accordingly, the BAOR was reduced from 77,000 to 64,000 over the next year.

The deployment, in the mid-1970s, of a Soviet brigade to Cuba was at the time perceived by some to represent the introduction of a tripwire force onto the island – a method of deterring aggression against Cuba from "potential attackers who would not want to engage" the full Soviet Army.

British military forces in the Falkland Islands prior to the Falklands War were intended to serve as a tripwire force, though were ultimately an ineffective one as they were so small and lightly armed that they did not represent a credible signal to Argentina of UK military commitment to the islands. The Argentine invasion force had been given orders to overcome resistance without inflicting British casualties, and during the initial invasion successfully managed to bypass or capture all British units without resorting to deadly force.

United States Forces Korea have also been referred to as a tripwire force due to the perception that they are too diminutive to singularly repel an attack by the Korean People's Army. Rather, they serve to convey "the certainty of American involvement should the North Koreans be tempted to invade".

Since 2014, several members of NATO deployed forces called NATO Enhanced Forward Presence to the Baltic states as a stated tripwire against possible Russian actions.

In January 2026, amid heightened tensions regarding the sovereignty of Greenland due to threats from the Trump administration of the United States of America, it was announced that France, Germany, Sweden, Norway, Finland, the Netherlands and the UK would be deploying small numbers of military personnel to the region, as part of Operation Arctic Endurance. The reported contributions included fifteen soldiers from France, thirteen from Germany, two from Sweden, two from Norway, two from Finland, one from the Netherlands and one from the United Kingdom.

=== Examples in theory ===
Paul K. Davis and John Arquilla have argued that the United States should have placed a tripwire force in Kuwait prior to the Iraqi invasion of Kuwait as a method of signaling to Iraq the commitment of the U.S. to an armed response. In this way, they state, the Gulf War might have been avoided.

In 2014 Saudi Arabia reportedly requested the deployment of Pakistani military units to Yemen to act as a tripwire force in the event of an attack against the kingdom by Iran via Yemen.

In 2015 Michael E. O'Hanlon theorized that a United States tripwire force could continue to be deployed in a hypothetically reunified Korea to meet American security guarantees to the region while avoiding provocation of China. According to O'Hanlon, a small enough U.S. military deployment in Korea, posted at a sufficient distance from the Chinese border, would not present an offensive threat to the PRC but would ensure the likelihood of American casualties in the event of a land invasion of the Korean Peninsula, thereby guaranteeing future American military commitment to any realized conflict.

== See also ==
- Dissuasion du faible au fort
