= Army Command =

Army Command may refer to:

- Army Command (Denmark)
- Army Command (Germany)
- United States Army Forces Command

== See also ==
- Command (military formation)
- Category:Army commands (military formations)
