= Kugler =

Kugler is a German surname. Notable people with the surname include:

- Adriana Kugler (born 1969), American economist
- Franz Theodor Kugler (1808–1858), German writer and art historian
- Franz Xaver Kugler (1862–1929), German chemist, mathematician, astronomer and Assyriologist
- Hans Gottfried Kugler (1893–1986), Swiss geologist
- Israel Kugler (1917–2007) American sociologist
- Jacek Kugler (born 1942), American political scientist
- Richard Kugler, American writer
- Sean Kugler (born 1966), American football coach
- Victor Kugler, helped hide Anne Frank and her family

Variations of the name include, but are not limited to: Coughler, Kooglar, Coughlin, Koeler, Coughlan, Coglar, Koglar, Koglin

== See also ==
- Kugler Township, Minnesota, U.S.
- Kugler (crater), a crater on the Moon
- Crosby-Kugler capsule, a surgical device used for obtaining biopsies of the bowel
