= Army Staff (Denmark) =

- Hærstaben
- Active: 1950–1990 (1st time); 2014–2018 (2nd time)
- Country: Denmark
- Branch: Royal Danish Army
- Type: Staff
- Role: Operational, territorial and tactical operations

The Army Staff (Danish: Hærstaben) is the name of various military staffs in the Royal Danish Army. At multiple times it was the highest authority within the Army.

== History ==
The original Army Staff was created following the first major restructuring following the Second World War, and consisted of the General Staff. It was responsible for war preparations (training and education), studies and planning. It supported the Army Command. After the Army Command was subjugated to the Defence Command in 1976, the Army Staff became the main command of the Army. Following the 1988 Defence Commission, it was decided that the Army Staff and the positions of Inspector of the Army would be disbanded and replaced with the Army Operational Command. Following the Danish Defence Agreement 2013–17, the Army Operational Command was disbanded, re-establishing the Army Staff. As part of the Danish Defence Agreement 2018–23, the Army Staff was abolished and changed to the Army Command again.

== Chief of the Army Staff ==
=== 1950–1970 ===
| No. | Portrait | Name (Birth–Death) | Term of office | | | Ref. |
| No. | Portrait | Name (Birth–Death) | Took office | Left office | Time in office | Ref. |
|---|---|---|---|---|---|---|
| 1 | | Major general Erik Kragh (1901–1984) | 1951 | 30 April 1957 | 5–6 years | |
| 2 | | Major general Povl Martin Digmann (1900–1969) | 1 May 1957 | 1959 | 1–2 years | |
| 3 | | Major general Valdemar Jacobsen (1902–1987) | 1959 | 30 June 1960 | 0–1 years | |
| 4 | | Major general Eigil Wolff (1914–1983) | 1 July 1960 | 31 October 1963 | 3 years, 122 days | |
| 5 | | Major general Otto Blixenkrone-Møller (1912–2006) | 1 November 1963 | 31 July 1967 | 3 years, 272 days | |
| 6 | | Major general Christian Vegger (1915–1992) | 1 August 1967 | 31 December 1969 | 2 years, 153 days | |

=== 1970–1990 ===
| No. | Portrait | Name (Birth–Death) | Term of office | | | Ref. |
| No. | Portrait | Name (Birth–Death) | Took office | Left office | Time in office | Ref. |
Chief of the Army (Chefen for Hæren)
| 1 | | Lieutenant general Otto Blixenkrone-Møller (1912–2006) | 1 January 1970 | 30 November 1972 | 2 years, 334 days | |
| 2 | | Major general Christian Vegger (1915–1992) | 1 December 1972 | 1976 | 3–4 years | |
| 3 | | Major general Harald Martin Hermann Boysen (1922–2019) | 1976 | 30 June 1982 | 5–6 years | |
Inspector of the Army (Inspektøren for Hæren)
| 1 | | Major general Harald Martin Hermann Boysen (1922–2019) | 1 July 1982 | 1987 | 4–5 years | |
| 2 | | Major general Jørgen Christian Essemann (born 1933) | 1987 | 1990 | 2–3 years | |
| 3 | | Major general Kjeld Hillingsø (born 1935) | 1990 | 31 December 1990 | 0 years | |

=== 2014–2018 ===
| No. | Portrait | Name (Birth–Death) | Term of office | | | Ref. |
| No. | Portrait | Name (Birth–Death) | Took office | Left office | Time in office | Ref. |
|---|---|---|---|---|---|---|
| 1 | Hans-Christian Mathiesen | Major general Hans-Christian Mathiesen (born 1965) | 1 October 2014 | 24 October 2018 | 4 years, 23 days | |
| – | Keld Robert Christensen | Colonel; Keld Robert Christensen (born 1963); Acting | 24 October 2018 | 31 December 2018 | 68 days | |

== See also ==
- Army Command (Denmark)
