= Hans-Christian Mathiesen =

Danish army officer (born 1965)

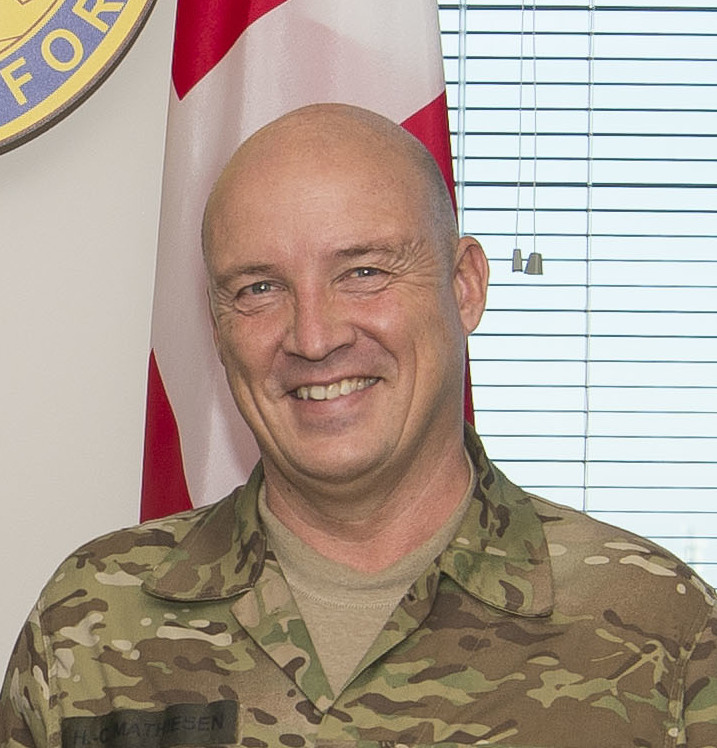
- (2018)

Chief of the Army Staff
- In office 1 October 2014 – 24 October 2018
- Preceded by: Per Ludvigsen
- Succeeded by: Keld Robert Christensen (act.)

Personal details
- Born: 11 April 1965 (age 61) Roskilde, Denmark
- Spouse: LGV (m. 2018)
- Nickname: HC

Military service
- Allegiance: Denmark
- Branch/service: Royal Danish Army
- Rank: Major General
- Unit: Schleswig Regiment of Foot; Guard Hussar Regiment

Major General Hans-Christian Mathiesen (born 11 April 1965) is a former chief of the Royal Danish Army, who was removed from his post following accusations of nepotism. In May 2020 he was found guilty of negligence, abuse of office, and passing on confidential information.

== Life ==
Born into a military family, Mathiesen joined the military after he finished gymnasium. He became a sergeant in 1985, and continued to the Royal Danish Military Academy, from which he graduated in 1989. Mathiesen served in a number of regiments, before he became a public figure in 2001 where he served as communications chief and the face outward for the Danish involvement in Afghanistan. He later served as commander of the Danish contribution to ISAF and Chief of the Joint Operations Centre for the Kosovo Force. In 2014, Mathiesen was appointed Chief of the Royal Danish Army.

== Convicted nepotism ==
The online defence media, OLFI, published on 18 October 2018, an exposé of Mathiesen's alleged claims of nepotism. In the report, it outlined how Mathiesen had used his power to give favourable job positions to his girlfriend "LGV".

The case began in spring 2017, when an anonymous source contacted OLFI, claiming: "obvious and extreme nepotism" was taking place "To advance the career of his girlfriend". The conflict can be traced back to 2014, when Mathiesen was responsible for the removal of international deployment as an admission criteria to the Masters in Military studies (MMS), allowing his girlfriend apply. Mathiesen reportedly also moved her name up the priority list, only recusing himself when it was too late to change the list. In 2015, Mathiesen created a position within the Army Staff with focus on "developing, implement and coordinate initiatives aimed at ensuring broad recruitment, retention and development of personnel in the Army until 2025". According to many sources, the job listing seemed to be directly aimed towards LGV, as a finished MMS was not required. As a result, there was only one applicant, LGV, who was promoted to major before she finished her MMS. In 2016, LVG applied for the higher Operations and Management Course (OFU) and got accepted, despite her lacking any experience in the required fields of international deployment and operational leadership experience.

As a result of the report, Mathiesen was temporarily suspended on 24 October 2018, pending further investigations. On 31 January 2019, the Judge Advocate Corps announced they decided to charge Mathiesen for civil service abuse under the Criminal Code and gross negligence of duty under the Military Penal Code.

On 23 August, it was announced that Mathiesen would permanently be removed from his post as Chief of the Army, despite there being no conclusions made by Judge Advocate Corps. He would be replaced by Michael Lollesgaard who served as Military Representative to NATO and EU. MALT who served as Vice Chief of Defence, would then replaced Lollesgaard's position in NATO. Mathiesen's lawyer saw the removal as an unfair disciplinary reaction. On 19 May 2020, Mathiesen was sentenced 60 days in jail, by the district court of Viborg, a sentence he appealed. On 24 August, the Western High Court upheld the ruling and extended the sentencing to 3 months, reasoning the severity of his attempted abuse of power. The High Court acquitted Mathiesen of lying to the Chief of Defence and of gross negligence. On 21 September, Mathiesen was official fired.

== Awards and decorations ==
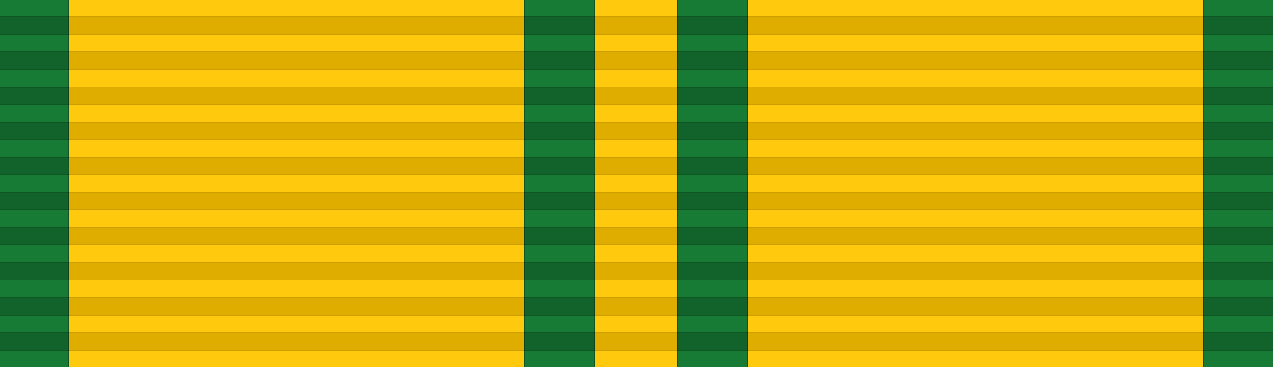
| Knight 1st Class of the Order of Dannebrog (Returned) |
| 25 Years of Good Service (Denmark) |
| Order of the Three Stars, Knight (Latvia) |
| National Defence Medal, Silver grade (France) |
| NATO Non-Article 5 medal for ISAF |
| NATO medal for Kosovo |
| Nijmegen Cross |

== Promotions ==
Date of promotions
| Private | 1984 |
| Sergeant | 1985 |
| Second lieutenant later Lieutenant | 1985 |
| First lieutenant | 1989 |
| Captain | 1993 |
| Major | 2000 |
| Lieutenant Colonel | 2003 |
| Colonel | 2008 |
| Brigade general | 2012 |
| Major general | 2014 |

Military offices
| Preceded by Per Ludvigsen as Chief of the Army Operational Command | Chief of the Army Staff; 2014-2018 | Succeeded by Col. Keld Robert Christensen (act.) |
