= SERE =

SERE may refer to two related military training programs:

- Survive, Evade, Resist, Extract training, United Kingdom
- Survival, Evasion, Resistance and Escape training, United States
  - "SERE" (The Unit), an episode of the television series The Unit which centers on such a training exercise

== See also ==
- Sere (disambiguation)
