= Paul K. Davis (policy analyst) =

Paul K. Davis is a policy analyst at the Rand Corporation in Santa Monica, California.

== Education ==
Davis holds a Ph.D. in chemical physics from M.I.T., where he worked on vibrational relaxation under Irwin Oppenheim, and a B.S. from the University of Michigan.

== Career ==
After working in physical science research at the Institute for Defense Analyses, Davis joined the Department of Defense where he was concerned with both strategy and program analysis. He was a Senior Executive. He is a Senior Principal Researcher at RAND (retired but adjunct) and a Professor of Policy Analysis at the Pardee RAND Graduate School.

Davis is known for work in strategic planning methods such as exploratory analysis under uncertainty and capabilities-based planning, and also for modeling. His modeling has included social-behavioral modeling and applications such as using qualitative causal models rooted in social science to understand motivations for terrorism and public support of terrorism.

Dr. Davis has also been active in professional organizations and international research groups, as well as to numerous national panels such as a national-academy study on prompt conventional global strike.

== Publications ==
=== Books ===
- (with Angela O'Mahony and Jonathan Pfautz, co-editors). Social-Behavioral Modeling for Complex Systems. Hoboken, New Jersey: Wiley & Sons. 2019. ISBN 978-1-119-48496-7
- (with Angela O'Mahony, Timothy R. Gulden Osonde A. Osoba, Katharine Sieck). Priority Challenges for Social and Behavioral Research and Its Modeling. Santa Monica, California: RAND Corp. 2018. ISBN 9780833099952.
- "Analysis to Inform Defense Planning Despite Austerity." Santa Monica, California: RAND Corp. 2014. ISBN 0833085077.
- (with Walter Perry, John Hollywood, and David Manheim). "Uncertainty-sensitive heterogeneous information fusion: assessing threat with soft, uncertain, and conflicting evidence". Santa Monica, California: RAND Corp., 2016. ISBN 978-0-8330-9277-9.
- (editor and co-author with others). Dilemmas of Intervention: Social Science for Stabilization and Reconstruction. Santa Monica, California: RAND Corp. 2011. ISBN 978-0-8330-5249-0.
- (with K. Cragin, co-editor). Social Science for Counterterrorism: Putting the Pieces Together. Santa Monica, California: RAND Corp. 2009. ISBN 978-0-8330-4706-9. Held in 199 libraries, according to
- (with Russell D. Shaver, and Justin Beck). Portfolio-Analysis Methods for Assessing Capability Options. Santa Monica, California: RAND Corp, 2008. ISBN 978-0-8330-4589-8
- (with Jonathan Kulick and Michael Egner). "Implications of Modern Decision Science for Military Decision Support Systems." Santa Monica, CA: RAND Corp, 2005. ISBN 978-0-8330-3808-1.
- "(with Brian M. Jenkins) Deterrence & Influence in Counterterrorism A Component in the War on Al Qaeda." Santa Monica, CA: Rand, 2002. Held at 721 libraries in 5 editions, according to
- (editor). "New Challenges in Defense Planning: Rethinking How Much Is Enough." Santa Monica, California: RAND Corp. 1994. ISBN 978-0-8330-5249-0.

=== Policy papers ===
- (with Angela O'Mahony, Christian Curriden, Jonathan Lamb) "Influencing Adversary States: Quelling Perfect Storms". Santa Monica, CA: RAND, in press 2021.
- Analytic architecture for capabilities-based planning, mission-system analysis, and transformation. Santa Monica, CA: Rand, 2002. ISBN 978-0-8330-3155-6. Held at 158 libraries in 3 editions, according to
- (with D. Gompert and R. Kugler) "Adaptiveness in defense: the basis of a new framework." Santa Monica, CA: RAND, 1996.OCLC Number 36019859. Held at 23 libraries according to

=== Peer-reviewed journal articles ===
- (with Steven W. Popper). "Confronting Model Uncertainty in Policy Analysis for Complex Systems: What Policymakers Should Demand". Journal of Policy and Complex Systems. Vol. 5, No. 2, 2019, pp. 118-121.
- "Defence Planning When Major Changes Are Needed". Defense Studies, Vol. 18, no. 3, 374-390.
- (with Peter Wilson, Jeongeun Kim, and Junho Park). "Deterrence and Stability for the Korea Peninsula". The Korea Journal of Defense Analyses. Vol. 28, No. 1, 2016, pp. 1-23.
- (with Peter E. Wilson). "The Looming Crisis in Defense Planning." Joint Forces Quarterly 63, October 2011, pp. 13–20.
- (with Robert Anderson). "Improving the Composability of DoD Models and Simulations." J. Defense Modeling and Simulation 1 (1), 2004, pp. 5–17."
