= 3rd General Command (Denmark) =

The 3rd General Command (Danish: 3. Generalkommando) (formerly the General Command of the Duchies (Danish: Generalkommandoen over Hertugdømmerne)) was the overall command of all Royal Danish Army units in Duchies of Holstein and Lauenburg. The command was abolished following Denmark's loss of Schleswig-Holstein, following the Second Schleswig War.

== Commanders ==
=== General Command of the Duchies (1739–1852) ===
No.	Portrait	Name (Birth–Death)	Term of office			Ref.
No.	Portrait	Name (Birth–Death)	Took office	Left office	Time in office	Ref.
1		Lieutenant field marshal Frederick Ernest of Brandenburg-Kulmbach (1703–1762)	1739	10 March 1762	22–23 years	
2		General field marshal Claude Louis, Comte de Saint-Germain (1707–1778)	10 March 1762	1769	6–7 years	
3		Lieutenant general Prince Charles of Hesse-Kassel (1744–1836)	1769	19 March 1814	44–45 years	
4		General; Prince Frederik of Hesse (1771–1845)	20 March 1814	25 March 1842	28 years, 5 days	
5		Prince Frederick of Nør (1800–1865)	31 March 1842	18 April 1846	4 years, 24 days	
–		Gotthard Lützow (1784–1850); Acting	18 April 1846	?	3–4 years	
?		Christoph von Krogh (1785–1860)	11 August 1850	30 November 1851	1 year, 111 days	
?		Frederik Bardenfleth (1781–1852)	1 December 1851	19 August 1852 †	262 days	

=== General Command of Holstein and Lauenburg (1852–1855) ===
No.	Portrait	Name (Birth–Death)	Term of office			Ref.
No.	Portrait	Name (Birth–Death)	Took office	Left office	Time in office	Ref.
1		Lieutenant general Christoph von Krogh (1785–1860)	1852	1855	2–3 years	

=== 3rd General command (1855–1864) ===
No.	Portrait	Name (Birth–Death)	Term of office			Ref.
No.	Portrait	Name (Birth–Death)	Took office	Left office	Time in office	Ref.
–		Georg Schøller (1793–1863)	10 December 1856	23 June 1857	195 days	
1		Georg Schøller (1793–1863)	23 June 1857	17 June 1863 †	5 years, 359 days	
2		Peter Frederik Steinmann (1812–1894)	22 October 1863	3 January 1864	73 days	

== Names ==
Names
Generalkommandoen over Hertugdømmerne	General Command of the Duchies	1739	–	1852
Generalkommandoen over Holsten og Lauenborg	General Command of Holstein and Lauenburg	1852	–	1855
3. Generalkommando	3rd General command	1855	–	1864

== Sources ==
- Clemmesen, Michael Hesselholt (1982). Jyllands landforsvar fra 1901 til 1940 (in Danish). Copenhagen: Det Krigsvidenskabelige Selskab. ISBN 87-981346-0-4.
- Liebe, P. I.; Borgstrøm, P. (1978a). Biografiske oplysninger om faste artilleriofficerer af linien 1. Bind (in Danish). Rigsarkivet.
- Liebe, P. I.; Borgstrøm, P. (1978b). Biografiske oplysninger om faste artilleriofficerer af linien 4. Bind (in Danish). Rigsarkivet.
- Norrie, Gordon (1962). "Felttoget i Mecklenburg 1762*". Historisk Tidsskrift. 11 (6). da: 641–669.
- Petersen, Vagn Aage, ed. (1984). Vejledning og oversigt I: Hæren 1660-1980. Rigsarkivet og hjælpemidlerne til dets benyttelse III (in Danish). Danish National Archives. ISBN 87-7497-073-9.
- Richter, Volhelm (1977a). Den Danske Landmilitæretat 1801-1894: I. Bind (in Danish). Copenhagen: Dansk Historisk Håndbogsforlag.
- Richter, Volhelm (1977b). Den Danske Landmilitæretat 1801-1894: II. Bind (in Danish). Copenhagen: Dansk Historisk Håndbogsforlag.
