= Defence Command (Denmark) =

Coordinates: 55.6781°N 12.6014°E

Danish Defence Command (DCD)
- Forsvarskommando
- Insignia
- Founded: 1 October 2014 (1969)
- Country: Kingdom of Denmark
- Size: ~170 civilian ~80 military
- Part of: Ministry of Defence
- Motto: Viribus Unitis (United strength)
- Budget: 15,8 billion^{1} DKK

Commanders
- Chief of Defence: General Michael Hyldgaard
- Vice Chief of Defence: Lieutenant General Max A.L.T. Nielsen

Insignia
- Identification symbol

The Danish Defence Command (DCD) (Danish: Forsvarskommando, FKO) is the Danish joint military command and the top coordination and controlling authority of the Danish Armed Forces. It is a Level I command authority, directly under the Ministry of Defence.

It consists of the Chief of Defence and three service staffs, Operations and Planning Staffs, known collectively as Forsvarsstaben (the Defence Staff), Arctic Command and the Special Operations Command.

== History ==
The Defence Command was established on the basic of law no. 334 of 18 June 1969 about the origination of the Danish Defence; in order to reduce resources expended and make a true combined Defence command of Denmark. It was a continuation of the Danish defence re-construction of 1950, which erected Ministry of Defence, Chief of Defence, Defence Staff, Army Command, Søværnskommandoen and Flyverkommandoen.

These latter commands were in 1969 combined into one and placed under the Ministry of Defence, giving the Chief of Defence full administrative and operational command of all branches of the Danish military. The staff of these former branch commands continued to exist inside FKO, but in 1982, which saw a major reconstruction of FKO, they too vanished in favour of an even more branch independent organisation. The reorganization resulted in a unified command structure similar to the previous General Command.

The Danish Defence agreement 2005–09 called for another major re-construction of the Danish military, affecting the origination of FKO.

Between 1973 and 2006 FKO was located in Vedbæk (Henriksholm Allé) a little north of Lyngby, in a modern steel and concrete building, built 1970 – November 1972 by Defence Construction Service. FKO moved to this building in March 1973.

FKO moved to Søarsenalet on Holmen Naval Base on July 24, 2006.

As a result of the Danish Defence Agreement 2013–17, the FKO saw major structural reorganization, to such an extent that it was renamed Joint Defence Command (Danish: Værnsfælles Forsvarskommando). On 1 January 2019, as part of the Danish Defence Agreement 2018–23, the name was reverted to the previous name.

== Organization ==
Organization of the Defence Command, as of 1 January 2026.

		Chief of Defence
			Defence Staff
Army Command	Naval Command	Air Command	Special Operations Command	Joint Arctic Command	Operational Support Command
