= Richard Kugler =

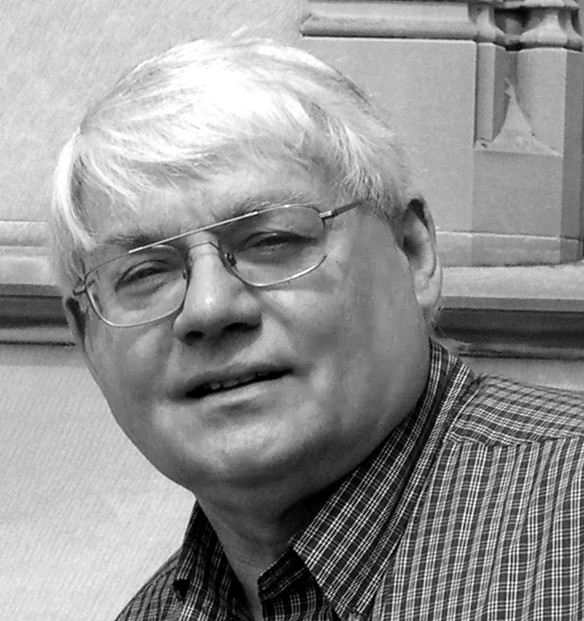
Richard Kugler

Richard L. Kugler is an American thinker and writer on U.S. national security policy and defense strategy.

== Life and work ==
Dr. Kugler is a thinker, writer, and scholar on U.S. national security policy and defense strategy. He is especially known for his analyses of complex policy issues and options, and for producing innovative policies, strategies, plans, programs, and budgets that help shape official thinking. He has been one of the original architects of NATO enlargement as well as multiple other U.S. policy departures in Europe, Asia, and the Persian Gulf. He was a Distinguished Research Professor at the Center for Technology and National Security Policy (CTNSP) of the National Defense University, and is now a senior consultant there. He advises senior echelons of the Office of Secretary of Defense (OSD), the Joint Staff, and the interagency community. He is author or editor of twenty books in his field, along with many journal articles in Foreign Affairs, Survival, and other journals, book chapters, and official studies.

Dr. Kugler, along with Dr. F. Stephen Larrabee and Dr. Ronald D. Asmus were the three RAND analysts who helped establish the US approach toward NATO Enlargement. RAND publicly portrayed this work as one of its most significant accomplishments in over 50 years. The principal work on NATO Enlargement was presented in a Foreign Affairs article ("Building a New NATO) and two Survival articles (Strategic Options and Budget Costs for NATO Enlargement). The London Times portrayed their work as helping redraw the political and military map of Europe. Other noteworthy collaborators of Dr. Kugler are Mr. David Gompert David Gompert, and Dr. Paul Davis.

A political scientist, defense economist, and operations research analyst, Dr. Kugler holds a Ph.D. from the Massachusetts Institute of Technology. From 1988–1997, he was a research leader at the public think tank, the RAND Corporation. From 1984–1988, he was director of Department of Defense's (DOD) Strategic Concepts Development Center, where he advised the Secretary of Defense and Chairman, Joint Chiefs of Staff. From 1975 to 1984, he was a senior executive in the Office of Secretary of Defense. During 1968–1972, he was a United States Air Force officer, including a tour in Southeast Asia. He has been awarded the Distinguished Civilian Service Medal, the Exceptional Civilian Service Medal, the Meritorious Civilian Service Medal, and other decorations.

Dr. Kugler has also taught graduate courses at RAND, Georgetown University and George Washington University in Security Policy Studies (Defense Analysis using Operations Research/Systems Analysis Techniques for policy analysis). Kugler was an adjunct professor of international relations at both universities. Many of his students have gone on to senior level positions in DOD, US Department of State, NATO and other national and international policy-oriented organizations.

== Books and documents ==
- A Search for Strategic Wisdom: Guiding the Twists and Turns of US National Security Strategy. March 2017. Www.amazon.com
- Strategic Shift: Appraising the Recent Changes to U.S. Defense Plans and Priorities: NDU, http://www.ndu.edu/CTNSP/docUploaded/Kugler-Wells%20-%20Strategic%20Shift%20(1%20page)%20-%20PrePub%20Final.pdf
- New Directions in U.S. National Security Strategy, Defense Plans, and Diplomacy. . INSS/CTNSP/NDU OR http://www.ndu.edu/CTNSP/docUploaded/New%20Directions.pdf
- Future Directions in US Foreign Policy.
- Pursuing NATO Smart Defense in Multinational Ways. With Peter Flory. INSS/NDU/, 2011.
- A Plan to Blunt the Impact on NATO of European Defense Cuts. With Dr. Hans Binnendjk. "Europe's World", Fall 2010.
- NATO Requirements for Territorial Defense and Expeditionary Operations: Similarities and Differences. CTNSP/NDU Working Paper, February 2010.
- An Extended Deterrence Regime to Counter Nuclear program of Iran Issues and Options - , September 2009.
- A New Transatlantic Compact? Center for Technology and National Security Transforming NATO - An NDU Anthology, (NDU) 2009
- Should NATO Write a New Strategic Concept? Center for Technology and National Security Transforming NATO - An NDU Anthology, (NDU) 2009
- Sizing the Civilian Response Capacity for Complex Operations - Civilian Surge, Key to Complex Operations. Richard L. Kugler and Christal Fonzo-Eberhard, (NDU) 2009
- Deterrence of Cyber Attacks - Cyberpower and National Security. Edited by Franklin D. Kramer, Stuart H. Starr, and Larry K. Wentz. (NDU), 2009
- Operation Anaconda: Lessons for Joint Operations - , Authors: Richard L. Kugler, Michael Baranick, and Hans Binnendijk, March 2009
- Seeing the Elephant: The U.S. Role in Global Security by Richard L. Kugler, Hans Binnendijk, Hardcover - (January 1, 2007)Potomac Books, 2006 Quality paperback, 319 pages ISBN 978-1-59797-100-3/ISBN 1-59797-100-6".
- Capsule Review - Seeing the Elephant: The U.S. Role in Global Security, Foreign Affairs, Lawrence D. Freedman, May/June 2007

- Case Study in Army Transformation: Creating Modular Forces, (National Defense University, Washington, D.C. Center for Technology and National Security Policy, 2008)
- Transatlantic Homeland Defense May 2006 7 pages. Authors: Neyla Amas; Stephen J. Flanagan; Stuart E. Johnson; Richard L. Kugler; Leo G. Michel; Anne M. Moisan; Jeffrey Simon; Kimberley L. Thachuk; (NDU, 2006)
- Operation Anaconda in Afghanistan: A Case Study of Adaptation in Battle. (NDU, 2007)
- Policy Analysis in National Security Affairs: New Methods for a New Era by Richard L. Kugler (U.S.) (2006)ISBN 1-57906-070-6.
- Learning from Darfur. Building a Net-Capable African Force to Stop Mass Killing, Authors: David C. Gompert; Courtney Richardson; Richard L. Kugler; Clifford H. Bernath; (NDU, 2005)
- The NATO Response Force 2002-2006: Innovation by the Atlantic Alliance Richard L. Kugler and Hans Binnendijk
- The Global Century: Globalization and National Security, Volume 2 by Richard L. Kugler and Ellen L. Frost(Paperback - April 15, 2002)
- Commitment to Purpose. NATO. ISBN 978-0-8330-1385-9 Pub. January 1993
- Strategic Issues and Options for the Quadrennial Defense Review by Paul K. Davis, Richard L. Kugler, R. J. Hillestad (RAND)
- Western Unity and the Transatlantic Security Challenge Authors: Peter van Ham; Richard L. Kugler; (George C. Marsall Center, European Center for Security Studies (2002)
- U.S. Military Strategy and Force Posture for the 21st Century (RAND, 1999)
- Strategic Assessment 1999 : Priorities for a Turbulent World. Richard Kugler (Editor)
- Free-Rider Redux: NATO Needs to Project Power (And Europe Can Help). David Gompert and Richard Kugler (Foreign Affairs, January/February 1995)
- Toward a Dangerous World?: U.S. National Security Strategy for the Coming Turbulence (Paperback - October 25, 1994) Foreign Affairs, January/February 1995
- Nato's Future Conventional Defense Strategy in Central Europe: Theater Employment Doctrine for the Post–Cold War Era
- Moscow's spring or NATO's autumn: U.S. policy and the future of Europe (A Rand Note) by Richard L Kugler (RAND, 1989)
- Lee's mistake: learning from the decision to order Pickett's Charge.: An article from: Defense Horizons by David C. Gompert and Richard L. Kugler (Digital - September 12, 2006)
- Custer in Cyberspace, February 2006, by David C. Gompert and Richard L. Kugler (NDU)
- Custer and cognition.G. Armstrong Custer): An article from: Joint Force Quarterly by David C. Gompert and Richard L. Kugler (Digital - November 20, 2006) - (NDU)
- A Recast Partnership? Institutional Dimensions of Transatlantic Relations. Simon Serfaty (ed.) Michael Brenner, Benoit d'Aboville, Jolyon Howorth, Franklin Kramer, Ivan Krastev, Richard Kugler, Julian Lindley-French, Vivien Schmidt, Simon Serfaty. CSIS March 3, 2008. ISBN 978-0-89206-518-9 (pb)
- A New Military Framework for NATO, May 2005 by David C. Gompert, and Richard Kugler (NDU)
- Needed - A NATO Stabilization and Reconstruction Force, September 2004 (NDU)
- Alternative Approaches to Army Transformation, July 2004 by Joseph N. Mait and Richard L. Kugler
- Dual-Track Transformation for the Atlantic Alliance, November 2003 (NDU)
- Mind the Gap: Promoting a Transatlantic Revolution in Military Affairs by David C. Gompert, Richard L. Kugler, Martin C. Libicki, and John P. White (Paperback - July 1999)
- Adapting Forces to a New Era: Ten Transforming Concepts, Richard Kugler and Hans Binnendijk,(NDU, 2001)
- Managing Change: Capability, Adaptability, and Transformation, Richard Kugler and Hans Binnendijk,(NDU, 2001)
- A Balanced Way Out of the Pentagon's Deadlock, International Herald Tribune, Richard Kugler and Hans Binnendijk, AUGUST 8, 2001
- Analytic Architecture for Joint Staff Decision Support by Leslie Lewis, John Schrader, Richard Kugler, William Fedorochko, James A. Winnfeld
- NATO military strategy for the post–Cold War era: Issues and options (A Project Air Force report)(RAND, 1992)
- Alternative approaches to Army transformation.: An article from: Defense Horizons by Joseph N. Mait/Richard L. Kugler (October 24, 2006)
- Adapting forces to a new era: ten transforming concepts.: An article from: Defense Horizons 9 by Richard L Kugler and Hans Binnendijk, July 28, 2005)
- Changes Ahead : Future Directions for the U.S. Overseas Presence(MR-956) (Paperback - October 25, 1998)
- Managing change: capability, adaptability, and transformation.: An article from: Defense Horizons by Richard L Kugler and Hans Binnendijk (NDU, July 28, 2005)
- Western Unity and the Transatlantic Security Challenge (The Marshall Center Papers, No. 4) by Peter van Ham/Richard L. Kugler (Paperback - 2002)
- A new military framework for NATO.: An article from: Defense Horizons by David C. Gompert and Richard L. Kugler (October 24, 2006)
- Building a new NATO, Foreign Affairs 72, Number 4, Dr. Ronald Asmus, Dr. F. Stephen Larrabee, Dr. Richard Kugler.(1993)
- NATO Expansion: The Next Steps. Survival 37, Number 1, Dr. Ronald Asmus, Dr. F. Stephen Larrabee, Dr. Richard Kugler (Spring 1995)
- The future of NATO and U.S. policy in Europe by Richard L Kugler (RAND, 1992)
- The great strategy debate: NATO's evolution in the 1960s (A Rand note) by Richard L Kugler (RAND,1991)
- Laying the foundations: The evolution of NATO in the 1950s (A Rand note) by Richard L Kugler (RAND, 1990)
- Enlarging NATO: The Russian Factor by Richard L. Kugler (Paperback - April 25, 1996)
- Dissuasion as a strategic concept.: An article from: Strategic Forum by Richard L. Kugler (Digital - July 25, 2005)
- Costs of NATO enlargement : moderate and affordable (SuDoc D 5.417:128) by Richard L. Kugler (RAND, 1997)
- Where is NATO's defense posture headed? (SuDoc D 5.417:133) (RAND, 1998)
- The Future U.S. Military Presence in Europe: Forces and Requirements for the Post–Cold War Era/R-4194-Eucom/Na(Rand Corporation//Rand Report)(Paperback - June 1992)
- Adaptiveness in National Defense: The Basis of a New Framework, National Defense Research Institute, Paul K. Davis, David Gompert, Richard Kugler, (RAND, 1996).
- U.S. national military strategy and force posture for the post-communist era. (RAND, 1992)
- Replacing the 2-MTW standard: Can a better approach be found?(RAND, 2000)
- U.S. Military Strategy and Force Posture for the 21st Century: Capabilities (Paperback - 1994)
- The politics of restraint: Robert McNamara and the strategic nuclear forces, 1963-1968 (Massachusetts Institute of Technology. Dept. of Political Science. Thesis. 1975. Ph. D) by Richard L Kugler (1975)

See Amazon.com Richard L. Kugler books at https://www.amazon.com/s/ref=ntt_athr_dp_sr_1?_encoding=UTF8&field-author=Richard%20L.%20Kugler&ie=UTF8&search-alias=books&sort=relevancerank

Dr. Kugler has written thousands of pages of original analysis for the Department of Defense. A great deal of Dr. Kugler's work has been used as the basis for U.S. national security policy during each administration from 1977 to the administration of President Barack Obama. Dr. Kugler is an analyst and is not involved in politics.
