= Peter Harling Boysen =

Danish military officer

Major-General Peter Harling Boysen
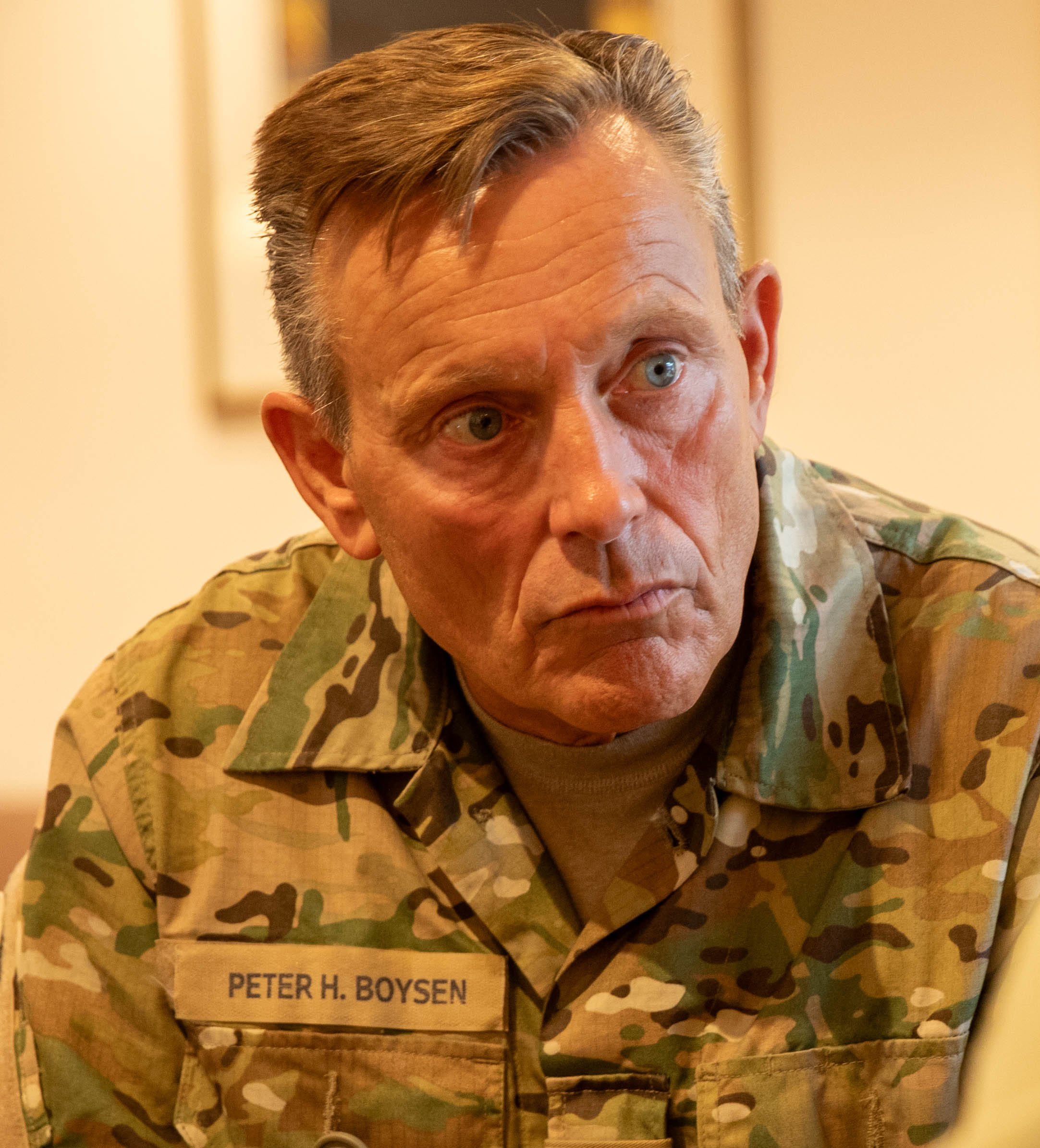
- General Peter H. Boysen during the Nordic Warfighter Symposium, 2024
- Born: 3 April 1963 (age 63)
- Alma mater: King's College London
- Military career
- Allegiance: Denmark
- Branch: Royal Danish Army
- Rank: Major-General

Peter Harling Boysen (born 3 April 1963) is a Danish general who serves as the chief of the Royal Danish Army.

He has extensive experience from international warzones and special operations, including NATO operations and UN peacekeeping forces, and has served in the Bosnian War and the war in Afghanistan. He was chief of the Special Operations Command prior to his appointment as Army chief in 2024.

In 2026, he leads the deployment to Greenland of hundreds of elite combat soldiers trained in arctic warfare, in response to the Greenland crisis. Upon arrival, General Boysen said he is ready to defend Greenland. Denmark has announced that a "substantial contribution" of the Danish Defence forces will be sent to Greenland under Boysen's command.

== Career ==
Boysen joined the Army in 1983 and graduated as an officer. He graduated from the Advanced Command and Staff Course in the United Kingdom and earned a master's degree in defense studies at King's College London. He has extensive international experience from warzones and has held command posts in UNFICYP in Cyprus, UNPROFOR and SFOR in Bosnia and Herzegovina, and has served with ISAF during the Afghanistan War. He was chief of planning in the Operations Staff from 2010 and chief of the Special Operations Command from 2018 to 2023. He then became Chief of the Royal Danish Army in 2024.

== Military ranks ==
His military ranks have been

- 1989 First Lieutenant
- 1997 Captain
- 2000 Major
- 2006 Lieutenant Colonel
- 2014 Colonel
- 2018 Major-General

== Honours ==
His honours include

- (Denmark) Commander First Class of the Order of the Dannebrog
- (Denmark) Defence Medal for International Service
- (Denmark) Badge of Honour for Good Service in the Army
- (United States) U.S. Army Commendation Medal for Military Merit
- NATO Medal
- (NATO) KFOR Medal
- (NATO) ISAF 5 Medal
- (United Nations) Cyprus Medal
- (United Nations) UNPROFOR Medal
