= Danish Defence Agreement 2013–2017 =

Danish Defence Agreement 2013-2017
- Type: Defence Agreement
- Signed: 30 November 2012
- Expiration: 28 January 2018
- Parties: Social Democrats; Social Liberal Party; Socialist People's Party; Venstre; Dansk Folkeparti; Liberal Alliance; Det Konservative Folkeparti
- Language: Danish

The Danish Defence Agreement 2013–2017 (Danish: Forsvarsforlig 2013-2017) is the white paper for the military of Denmark in the period of 2013 to 2017. The agreement was signed 30 November 2012 by the government and Venstre, Dansk Folkeparti, Liberal Alliance and Det Konservative Folkeparti.

It calls for a significant reconstruction of the entire Danish military. It was replaced by the 2018–2023 Defence Agreement.

== Highlights ==
=== Army ===
- The Army should have the capacity to send a battalion on a short or long term deployment.
- The six battalions are restructured into three bigger ones.
- One battalion is on high readiness alert, with the ability to be shipped with short notice.
- Restructuring of military academic centers into:
  - Army International Center (Hærens Internationale Center)
  - Army Combat Center (Hærens Kampcenter)
  - Army Combat Support Center (Hærens Kampstøttecenter)
  - Army Support Center (Hærens Støttecenter)
  - Army Special Center (Hærens Specialcenter)

After the agreement was reached there were changes to the structure of the centers. Parts of the Army Combat Center was moved to the Army Combat Support Center, which was in turn renamed Army Combat and Fire Support Center. Furthermore, Army Support Center and Army Special Center were merged to create Army Intelligence Center.

=== Navy ===
- The Navy should have the capacity to send two units on a short term, short notice mission, or one big unit for a long term mission.
- Collecting the Navy's Special School and the Navy's NCO School under one school.

==== Arctic ====
- Increase in enforcement of sovereignty.
- Collecting all North Atlantic commands under Arctic Command.
- Inspection cutter Tulugaq is replaced by a Knud Rasmussen-class patrol vessel.

=== Airforce ===
- The Air Force should have the capacity to send up to three simultaneous contributions at short notice.
- Before the summer of 2015, a decision should be taken on the new type of fighter for the air force, between Boeing F/A-18F Super Hornet, Lockheed Martin F-35 and Eurofighter Typhoon.
- The Lynx helicopters are to be replaced by nine new MH-60R Seahawk helicopters.

=== Joint Service ===
- An organizational collection of all officer academies.
- A collection of all military police.
- Collecting all of Intelligence Services under one headquarter.
- The creation of
- Restructuring the command structure:

Disbanding:

- Defence Command (Forsvarskommandoen)
  - Army Operational Command (Hærens Operative Kommando)
  - Operative Command of the Navy (Søværnets Operative Kommando)
  - Tactical Air Command (Flyvertaktisk Kommando)

Creating:

- Joint Defence Command (Værnsfælles Forsvarskommando)
  - Operations Staff (Operationsstaben)
  - Coordination and Development Staff (Koordinations- og Udviklingsstaben)
  - Army Staff (Hærstaben)
  - Naval Staff (Marinestaben)
  - Air Staff (Flyverstaben)
  - Special Operations Command (Specialoperationskommandoen)

| Preceded by Danish Defence Agreement 2010–14 | Danish Defence Agreement; 2013 – 2017 | Succeeded by Danish Defence Agreement 2018–2023 |
