= Danish Defence Agreement 2018–2023 =

Danish Military

Danish Defence Agreement 2018-2023
- Type: Defence Agreement
- Signed: 28 January 2018
- Expiration: 2023
- Parties: Venstre; Liberal Alliance; Det Konservative Folkeparti; Social Democrats; Dansk Folkeparti; Social Liberal Party
- Language: Danish

Danish Defence Agreement 2018–2023 (Danish: Forsvarsforlig 2018–2023) is the white paper for the military of Denmark in the period of 2018 to 2023. The agreement was signed 28 January 2018 by the government and Social Democrats, Dansk Folkeparti, and Social Liberal Party. It replaced the 2013–2017 Defence Agreement.

== Highlights ==
The main aim of the agreement is to increase:

- Denmark's contribution to NATO, as a deterrent and collective defence.
- the military's capabilities to act in international operations and international stabilization efforts.
- Denmark's defence against Cyber attacks.

It is furthermore decided to increase the budget of the military, by an adding additional 4.8 billion DKK by 2023.

=== Army ===
Concerning the army, there were several major changes.

- Army Staff and Danish Division are collected at Karup.
- The creation of a light infantry battalion in Haderslev.
- The creation of a tank squadron in Holstebro.
- New joint UAV forces are placed in Aalborg.

=== Navy ===
Concerning the navy, there were several major changes.

- Naval Staff and Naval Tactical Staff are collected at Karup.

=== Air force ===
Concerning the Air force, there were several major changes.

- Air Staff and the Air Force's Tactical Staff are collected at Karup.
- Air Force Training Centre is disbanded and education is placed in Royal Danish Defence College.
- National Air Operations Centre (NAOC) and Special Operations Air Task Group (SOATG) created in Karup.
- Operations Support Wing created in Karup.

=== Special Operations Command ===
- Creation of Composit Special Operations Component Command (C-SOCC).

== Notes ==
Preceded by Danish Defence Agreement 2013–2017	Danish Defence Agreement; 2018 – 2023	Incumbent
