= Royal Danish Army =

Land warfare branch of Denmark's military

- Hæren
- Coat of arms of the Royal Danish Army
- Founded: 17 November 1614; 411 years ago
- Country: Kingdom of Denmark
- Allegiance: (Danish Realm) Constitution of Denmark; Denmark; Faroe Islands; Greenland
- Type: Army
- Role: Land warfare
- Size: Active: 25,400; Reserve: 63,000; 363 tracked and 257 wheeled armoured vehicles
- Part of: Danish Defence
- Mottos: Fordi noget er værd at kæmpe for (transl. Because something is worth fighting for)
- Equipment: See list
- Engagements: Thirty Years' War (1625–1629); Torstenson War (1643–1645); Second Nordic War (1657–1660); Scanian War (1675–1679); Great Nordic War (1700 & 1709–1720); Napoleonic Wars (1807–1814); First Schleswig War (1848–1851); Second Schleswig War (1864); German invasion of Denmark (1940); Operation Bøllebank (1994); War in Kosovo (1998–1999); War in Afghanistan (2001–2021); Iraq War (2003–2007)
- Website: Official Website

Commanders
- Chief of Army Command: Major-General Peter Harling Boysen
- Sergeant Major of the Army: Jesper Madsen Mølgaard
- Notable commanders: Christian IV; Ulrik Frederik Gyldenløve; Frederick IV; Prince Charles of Hesse-Kassel; Prince Frederik of Hesse; Frederick VI

Insignia
- War flag

The Royal Danish Army (Note: Danish: Hæren; Faroese: Herurin; Greenlandic: Sakkutuut) was founded in 1614, and forms the land-based branch of the Danish Armed Forces, together with the Danish Home Guard.

In recent years, the army has transitioned from its traditional role of anti-invasion defence, instead focusing on out of area operations.

== History ==
Founded in 1614, in the wake of the Kalmar War, the Royal Danish Army was originally designed to maintain Denmark's sovereignty and protect her interest. With time, these goals have developed into also encompassing the need to protect freedom and peaceful development in the world with respect for human rights.

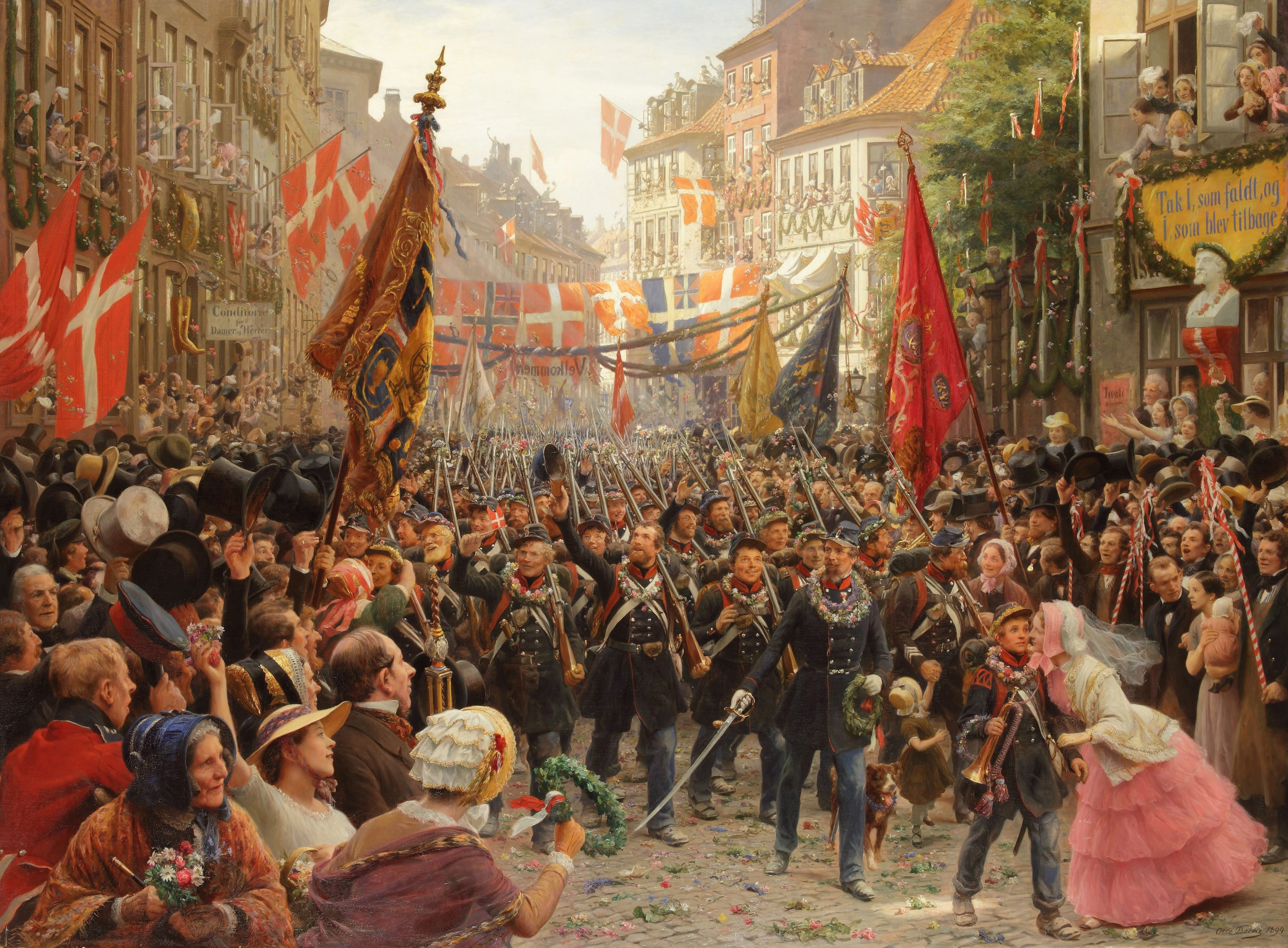
Danish military veterans are welcomed home and greeted as victors in the streets of Copenhagen, upon return from the First Schleswig War, 1849. The banner reads 'Thank you, you who fell, and you who survived'

The Danish King remained commander in chief throughout the Early Modern period, in the Thirty Years' War, the Dano-Swedish War (1657–58) and the Scanian War (1675–1679), the Great Northern War (1700–1721), the Theatre War of 1789/9 and the Napoleonic Wars. In 1815, however, as a result of continued evolution and division of command, four general commands were created with the King as the supreme authority: the General Command over Zealand, Lolland-Falster, Møn and Bornholm, the General Command over Funen, General Command of the Duchies and General Command for Langeland, Ærø and Tåsinge.

The Royal Danish Army has historically been an integral part of the defence of Denmark and thus involved in warfare, skirmishes and battles continuously to protect her interests. Most notably various territorial wars with Sweden, Russia and Prussia, the Napoleonic Wars on the side of France.

=== Recent deployments ===
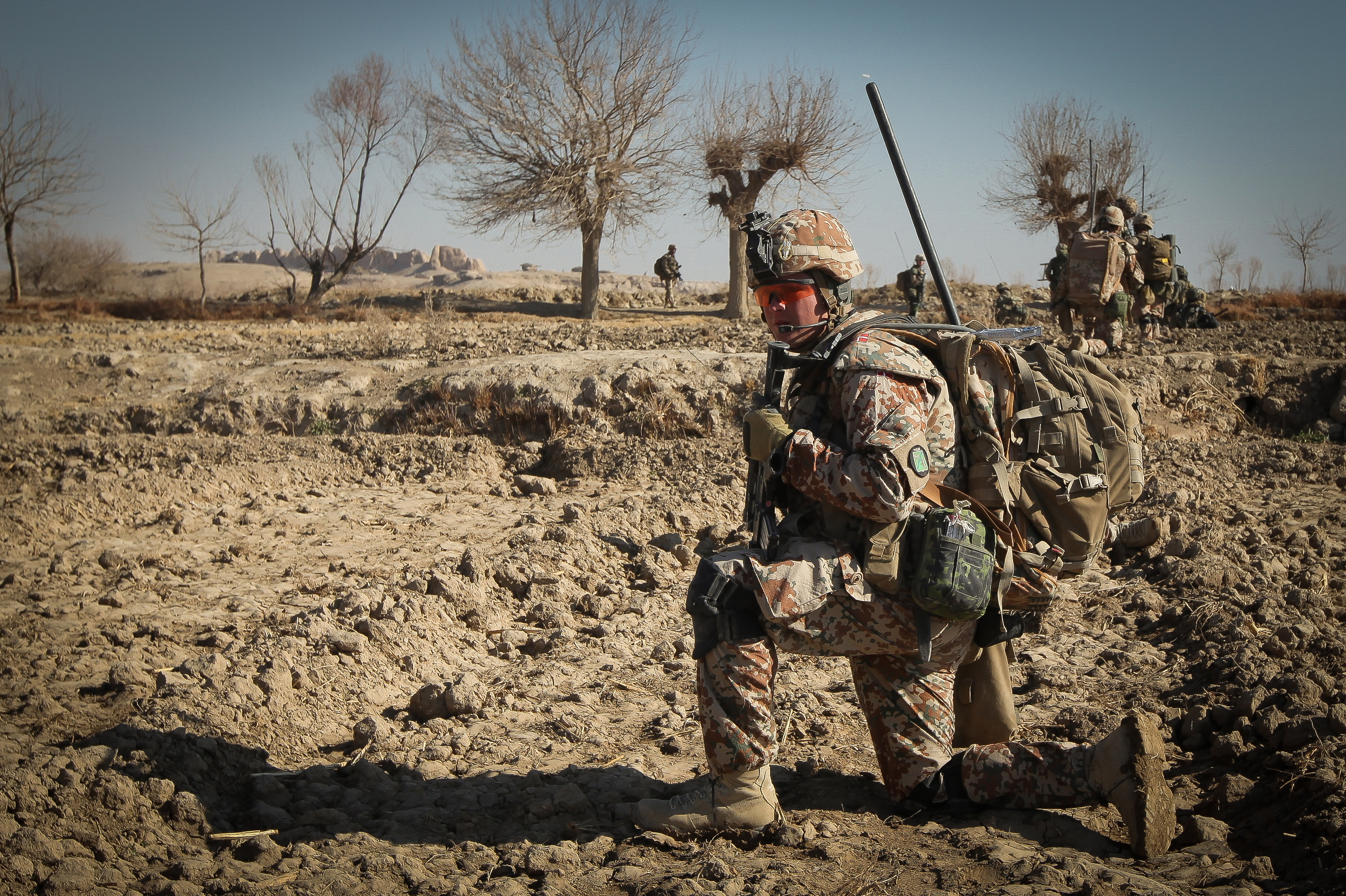
A Danish soldier surveys the Afghan plains while halted during a foot patrol in the district of Nahr-e Saraj, Helmand Province, Afghanistan on January 6, 2012

The Royal Danish Army has been committed to a number of United Nations and NATO peacekeeping and unconventional warfare operations since becoming involved in the Yugoslav Wars under UN mandate in 1994, most notably in the famous Operation Bøllebank. The Royal Danish Army was also engaged in the Kosovo War and continues to this day to maintain peacekeeping operations in Kosovo as part of the United Nations Interim Administration Mission in Kosovo (UNMIK), together with the Danish Home Guard. In addition, the Royal Danish Army was involved in the War in Iraq from 2003 to 2007 with a significant contingent of soldiers responsible for creating and maintaining peace in the province of Basra, together with the British.

Denmark lost its first soldier in Iraq on 17 August 2003 when Preben Pedersen, a 34-year-old lance corporal with the Jutland Dragoon Regiment, became the first coalition soldier not from the United States or Britain to die in the Iraq War. Starting in 2001, the Royal Danish Army was also involved in the War in Afghanistan with the Royal Danish Army and the British Army involved in heavy clashes with the Taliban in Helmand Province, where about 760 Danish soldiers controlled a large battlegroup. The Danish army withdrew its combat forces from Afghanistan in May 2014. After the Afghan National Army took responsibility for the security in Afghanistan in 2015, the Danish army has provided training, advisory and security support as part of Resolute Support Mission.

In an effort to relieve police officers in Copenhagen and at the border control, Danish soldiers replaced police officers in 2017 at different locations, marking the first time in 86 years soldiers were used to keep order in cities.

== Organization 2025 ==
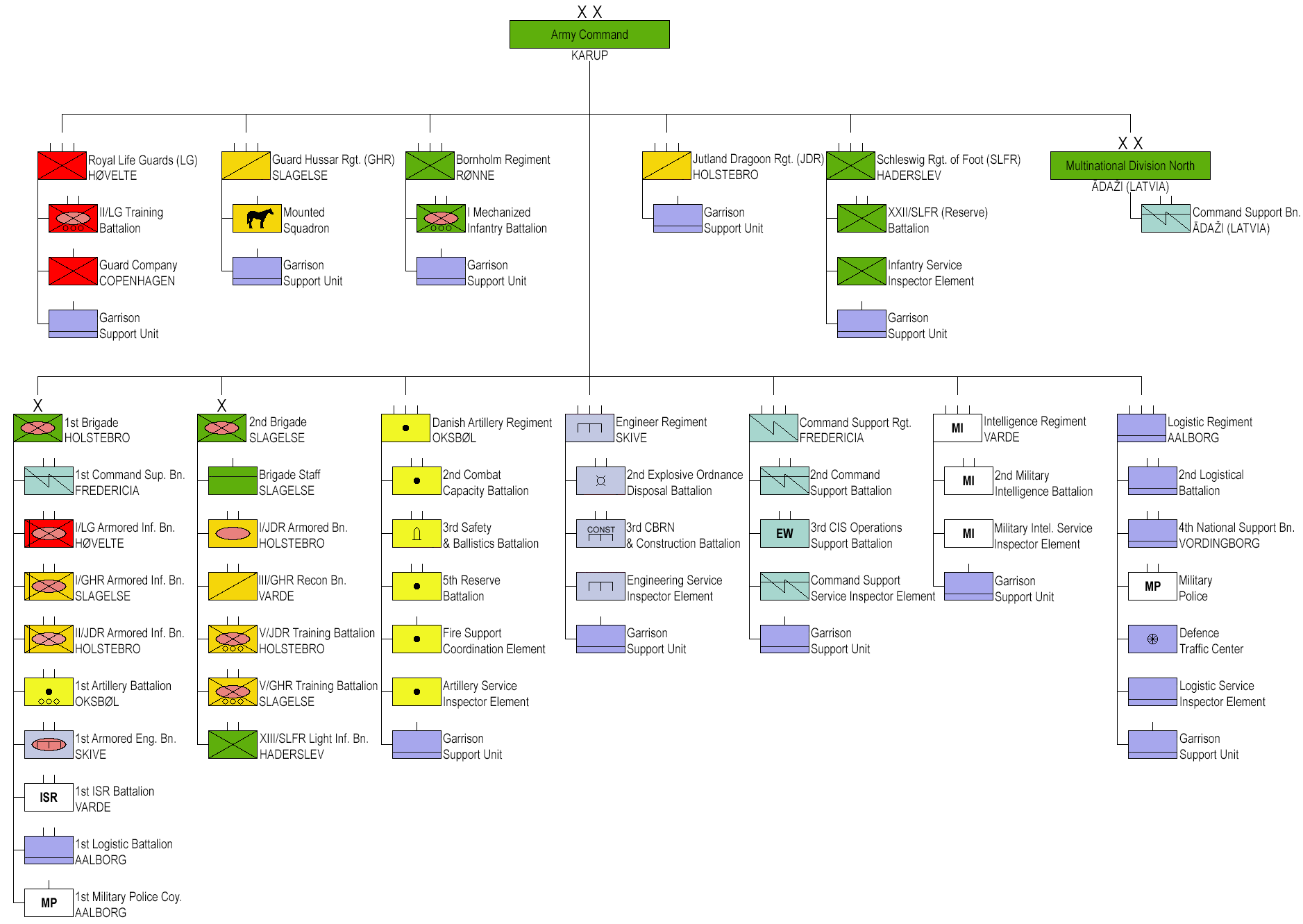
Royal Danish Army operational organization 2026

Danish Army regiments and major combat unit locations, 2019

The structure of the Danish army changed in 2015, leaving Danish Division without brigades or support troops directly under its command. The two brigades had only command over combat battalions, as combat support and logistic support units were grouped under various support centres. 1st Brigade consisted of four combat battalions and was tasked with providing troops for international deployments. 2nd Brigade consisted of five battalions and was tasked with the defence of the Danish territory. Support centres contained the army's combat support, combat logistic and general support units. This structure was changed in

- Army Command, in Karup
  - Major HQ's & Combat maneuver units
    - Multinational Division North, in Ādaži (Latvia) part of I. German/Netherlands Corps.
    - 1st Brigade, in Holstebro affiliated with Multinational Division North
    - 2nd Brigade, in Slagelse
  - Regiments
    - Danish Artillery Regiment, in Oksbøl
    - Engineer Regiment, in Skive
    - Signal Regiment, in Fredericia
    - Logistic Regiment, in Aalborg
    - Intelligence Regiment, in Varde
    - Royal Life Guards, in Høvelte
    - Guard Hussar Regiment, in Slagelse
    - Jutland Dragoon Regiment, in Holstebro
    - Schleswig Foot Regiment, in Haderslev
    - Bornholm Regiment, on Bornholm (activated 12 June 2025)

== Equipment ==
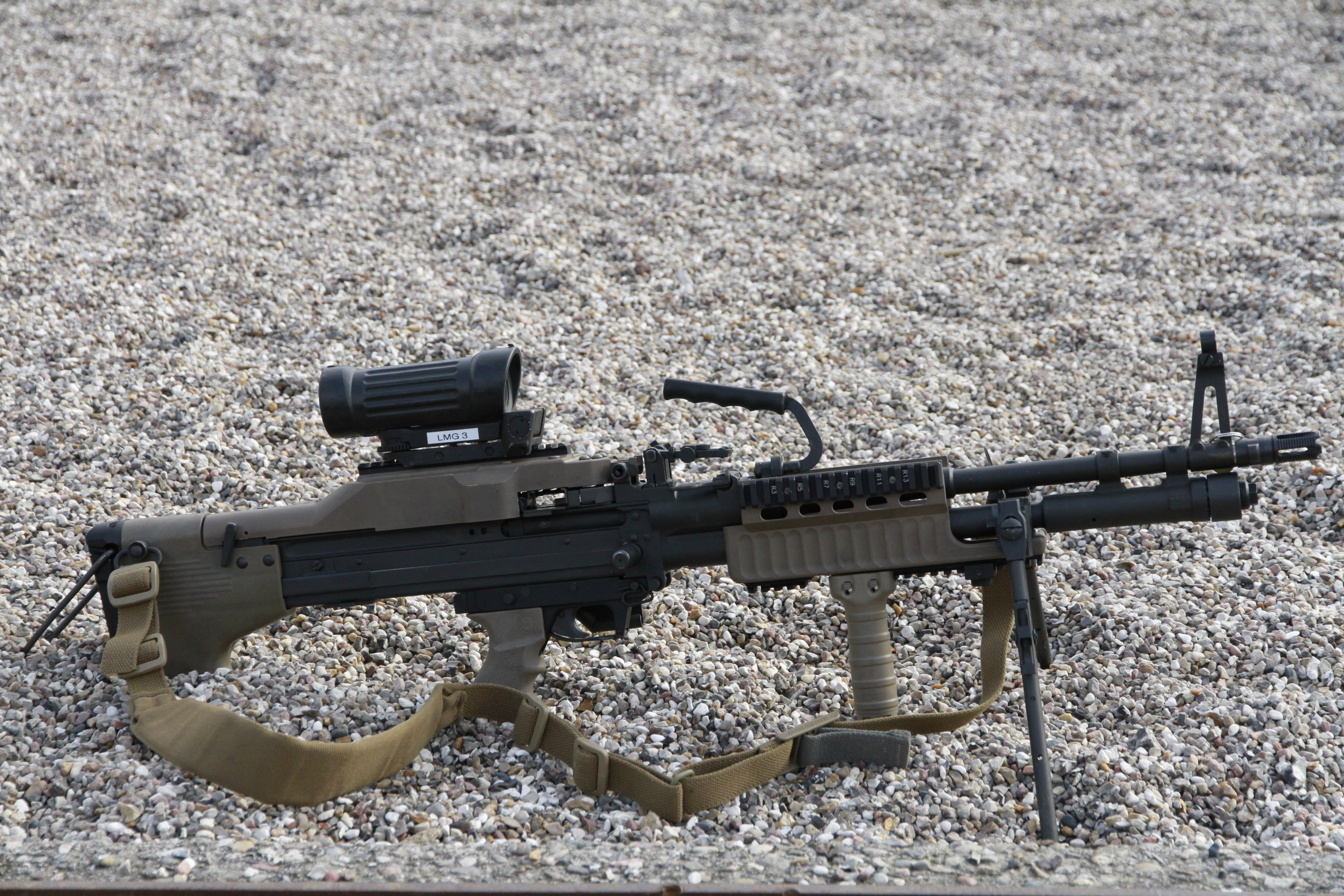
M60E6 general-purpose machine gun

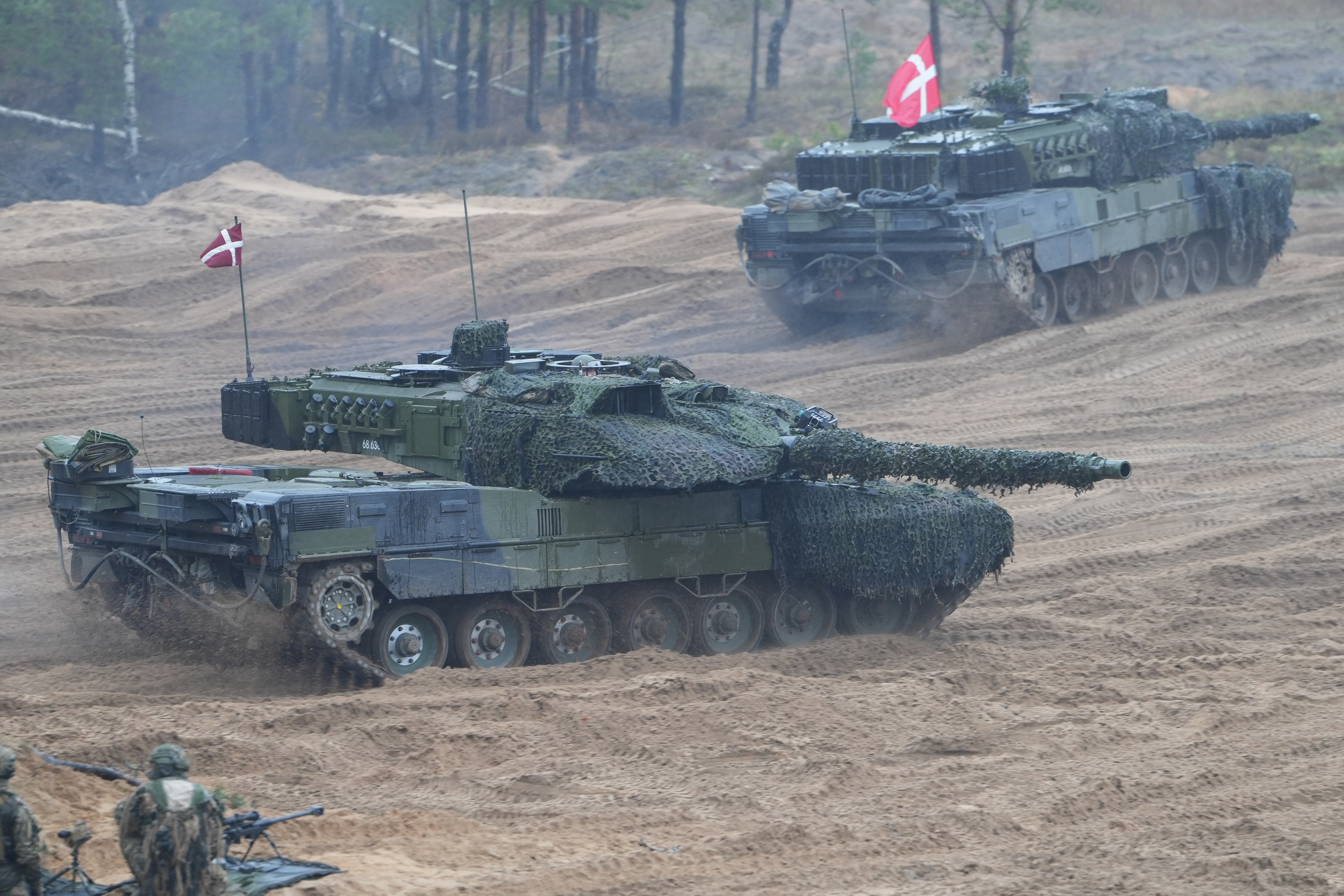
Leopard 2A7DK main battle tank

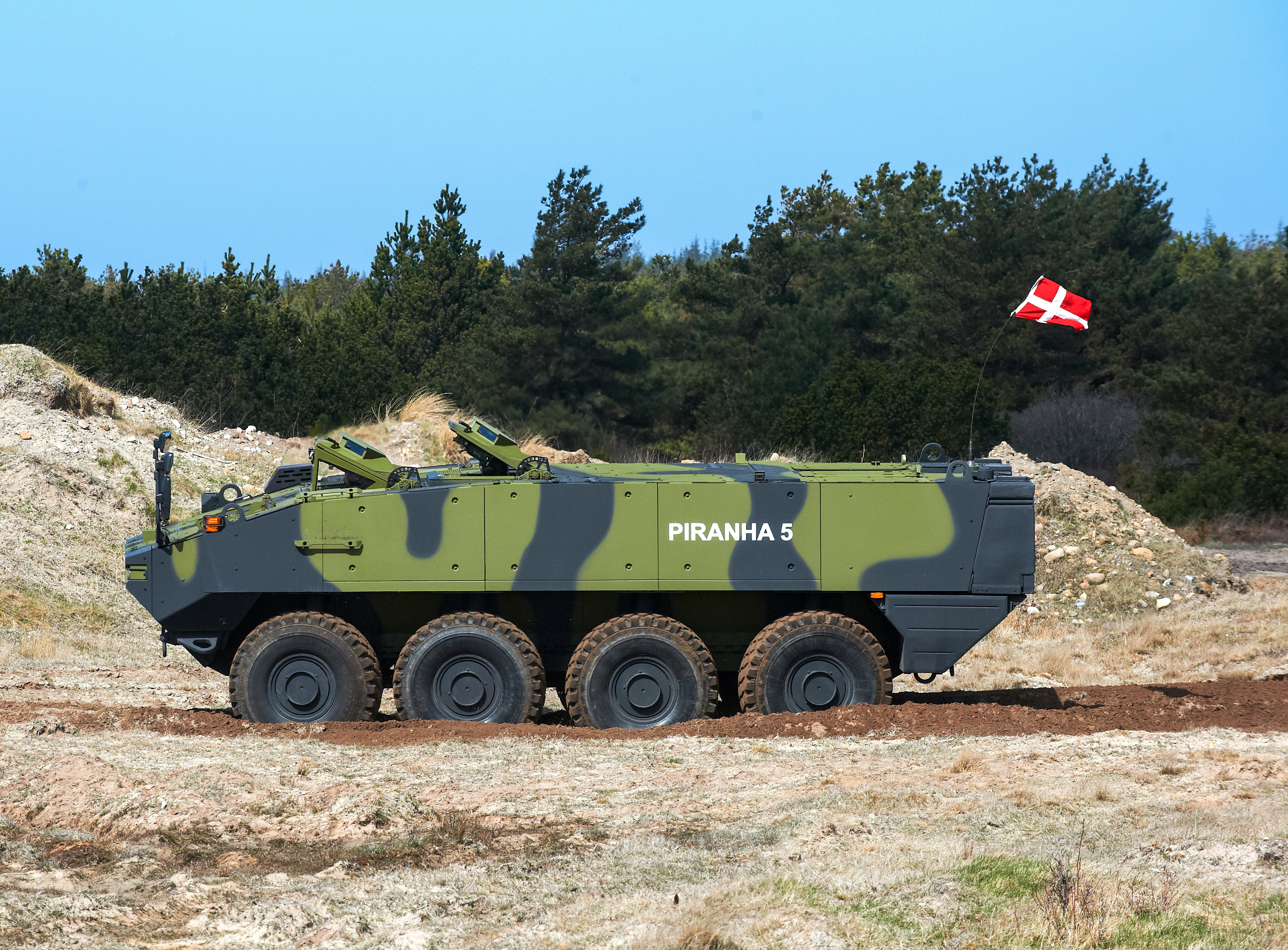
Mowag Piranha V armoured fighting vehicle

== Army Aviation Troops ==
The Danish Army Aviation Troops (Hærens Flyvertropper) were established in 1923 following the rapid development of military aircraft technology. The Aviation Troops flew two squadrons of Fokker C.V reconnaissance aircraft from 1923 to 1932, when 17 Gloster Gauntlet fighters were purchased to form two new squadrons. In 1937, ten Fokker D.XXI fighters were built on licence in the Royal Army Aircraft Factory at Værløse. As a result of the establishment of the Royal Danish Air Force in 1950, the Army Aviation Troops were disbanded and activities transferred to the new service. During the Cold War the Army created the Royal Danish Army Air Corps (Hærens Flyvetjeneste) in 1971 with 12 Hughes OH-6 Cayuse light observation helicopters. In 1974, an additional 4 Hughes OH-6 Cayuse were added. The Army bought 12 Eurocopter Fennec as anti-tank helicopters in 1990. But with the end of the Cold War and the reduction of forces, the 12 Eurocopter Fennec AS 550 and 10 Hughes OH-6 Cayuse (both as utility helicopters) were transferred to the Squadron 724 of the Air Force in 2003, and the Army Air Service disbanded.

== Ranks and insignia ==
Each regiment and corps has distinctive insignia, such as a cap badge, berets, Formation patchs or stable belt, and Badges of the Danish Military used on uniforms

=== Commissioned officer ranks ===
The rank insignia of commissioned officers.

NATO code	OF-10	OF-9	OF-8	OF-7	OF-6	OF-5	OF-4	OF-3	OF-2	OF-1
Royal Danish Army
Royal Danish Army		General	Generalløjtnant	Generalmajor	Brigadegeneral	Oberst	Oberstløjtnant	Major	Kaptajn	Premierløjtnant	Løjtnant	Sekondløjtnant
Danish Pay Grade		M406	M405	M404	M403	M402	M401	M332 M331 M322	M321	M312	M311	M310

=== Other ranks ===
The rank insignia of non-commissioned officers and enlisted personnel.

NATO code	OR-9	OR-8	OR-7	OR-6	OR-5		OR-4	OR-3	OR-2	OR-1
Royal Danish Army
Royal Danish Army	Chefsergent	Seniorsergent	Oversergent		Sergent	Sergent (Officerselev)	Korporal	Overkonstabel af 1. grad	Overkonstabel	Konstabel
Danish Pay Grade	M232	M231	M221		M212	M211	M113	M112

== Disbanded Regiments of the Royal Danish Army ==
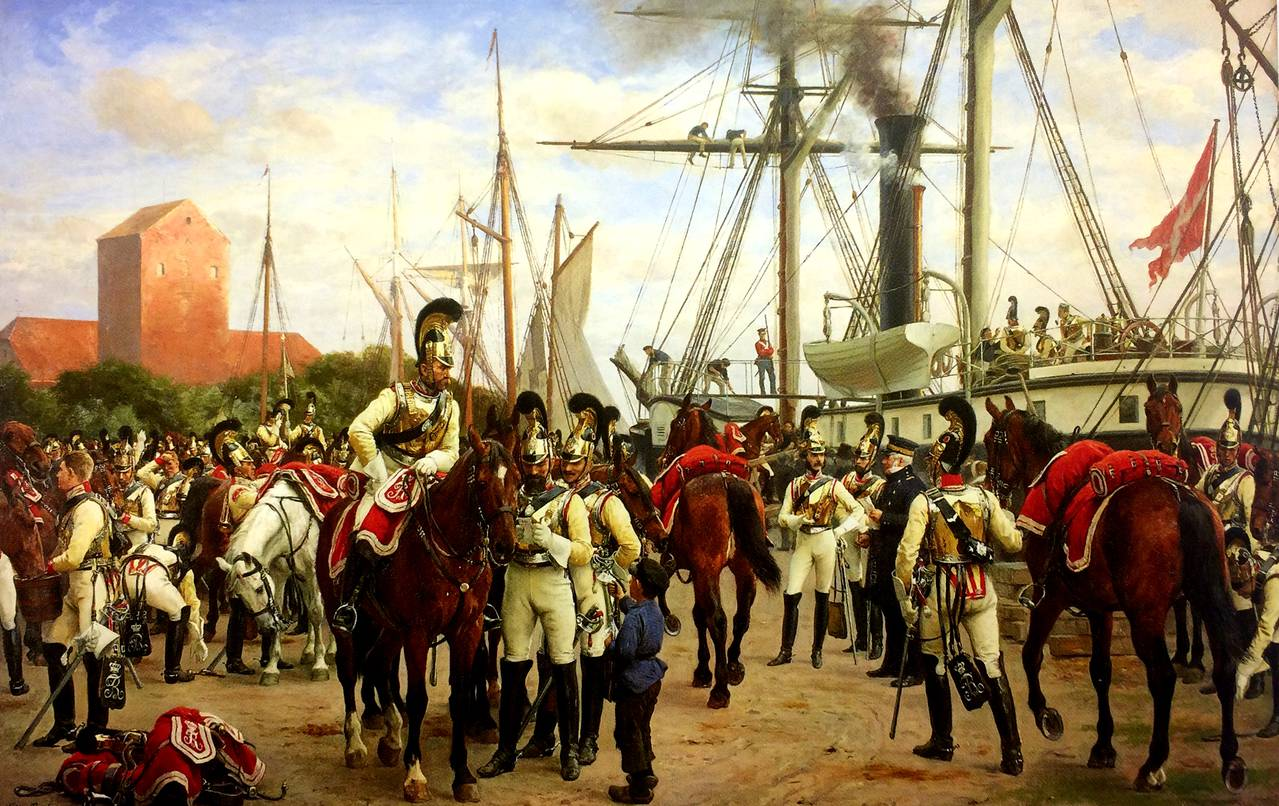
Painting of the former army regiment Livgarden til Hest

The Army has throughout its long history had many different regiments that have either changed names, been disbanded, or been amalgamated or merged. Since the end of the Cold War has seen many cuts to military expenditure, many regiments have been downsized and merged. Likewise, further development of military tactics have led to a streamlining of the regiments.
