= List of Danish regiments =

This is a list of Royal Danish Army regiments that have existed since the 15th century. Most formations have changed names several times during their existence. Listed here are commonly used names.

== Infantry ==
Regiments disbanded, merged or amalgamated in the modern era (1951–present) or still active:

CoA	Pre-1961 name	Post-1961 name	Established	Disbanded	Notes	Ref.
	Royal Life Guards		1658	Still active		
	1st Regiment	Danish Life Regiment	1763	1 January 2001	Merged into the Guard Hussar Regiment	
	2nd Regiment	Schleswig Regiment of Foot	1778	1 January 2001	Merged into the Prince's Life Regiment. Reactivated on 1 January 2019.	
	2nd Regiment	Schleswig Regiment of Foot	1 January 2019	Still active	Merged into the Prince's Life Regiment. Reactivated on 1 January 2019.	
	3rd Regiment	Prince's Life Regiment	1657	1 August 2005	Merged into the Jutland Dragoon Regiment	
	4th Regiment	Zealand Life Regiment	1614	1 January 2001	Merged into the Guard Hussar Regiment	
	5th Regiment	Falster Regiment of Foot	1747	1 August 1976	Merged into the Danish Life Regiment	
	6th Regiment	Funen Life Regiment	1614	1 November 1991	Merged into the Schleswig Regiment of Foot	
	7th Regiment	Jutland Regiment of Foot	1675	1 November 1961	Amalgamated with the King's Regiment of Foot into King's Jutland Regiment of Foot	
	8th Regiment	Queen's Life Regiment	1657	1 January 2001	Merged into the Prince's Life Regiment	
	9th Regiment	King's Regiment of Foot	1657	1961	Merged into the Schleswig Regiment of Foot	
	9th Regiment	King's Jutland Regiment of Foot	1961	1 November 1991	Merged into the Schleswig Regiment of Foot	
	10th Regiment	Field Lord's Regiment of Foot	1703	1 August 1961	Merged into the Queen's Life Regiment	
	Marine Regiment		1672	2000	Three infantry battalions under Bornholm's Værn	
	Infantry Pioneer Command		1938	1951	Merged into the King's Regiment of Foot	

Regiments disbanded before the modern era:

Flag	Name	Established	Disbanded	Notes	Ref.
	2nd Danish Recruited Infantry Regiment	1703	1721		
	Copenhagen Infantry Regiment	1808	1816		
	Fyen National Regiment (of foot)	1733	1765		
	Fyen Recruited Infantry Regiment	1733	1789	Merged into the Prince's Life Regiment	
	Grenadier Guards	1701	1763		
	Halberdier Guard	1571	1763		
	Holstein Infantry Regiment	1778	1951		
	Kiel Infantry Regiment	1773	1773		
	North Jutland National Regiment (of foot)	1733	1765		
	Oldenburg Infantry Regiment	1747	1951		
	Oldenburg National Regiment	1704	1765		
	Prince Georg's Regiment	1658	1721	Merged into 3rd Dragoon Regiment and Plön Recruited Infantry Regiment	
	Plön Recruited Infantry Regiment	1764	1767		
	South Jutland National Regiment (of foot)	1733	1765		
	Schleswig National Regiment (of foot)	1737	1765		
	Schleswig-Holstein National Regiment	1737	1765		
	Scanian Regiment	1614	1658		
	Viborg Recruited Infantry Regiment	1703	1789		
	Zealand Infantry Regiment	1675	1803	Merged into the Marine Regiment	
	Zealand National Regiment (of foot)	1735	1765		

== Cavalry ==
Regiments disbanded in the modern era or still present:

CoA	Name	Established	Disbanded	Notes	Ref.
	Jutland Dragoon Regiment	1679		Still active	
	Guard Hussar Regiment	1762	2000		
	Guard Hussar Regiment	2000 (1614)		Still active	

Regiments disbanded before the modern era:

- Royal Horse Guards (1661–1866)
- 1st Dragoon Regiment (1672–1856)
- 2nd Dragoon Regiment (1683–1910)
- 3rd Dragoon Regiment (1670–1932), merged with 5th Dragoon Regiment in 1932 to form the Jutland Dragoon Regiment
- 4th Dragoon Regiment (1670–1923)
- 5th Dragoon Regiment (1679–1932), merged with 3rd Dragoon Regiment in 1932 to form the Jutland Dragoon Regiment
- 6th Dragoon Regiment (1670–1865), merged into 3rd Dragoon Regiment
- 3rd Zealand National Mounted Regiment (1675–1721)
- Holstein Lancer Regiment (1700–1842)
- Zealand Dragoon Regiment (1670–1789)
- Zealand Cuirassier Regiment (1670–1767)
- Schleswig Cuirassier Regiment (1675–1842)
- Oldenburg Cuirassier Regiment (1703–1767)

== Artillery and other regiments ==
=== Artillery ===
- Fortress Artillery Regiment (1892–1922)
- Coastal Artillery Regiment (1909–1932), amalgamated into Royal Danish Navy
- 1st Field Artillery Regiment (Crown's Artillery Regiment), merged with 2nd Field Artillery Regiment in 1982 to form the King's Artillery Regiment.
- 2nd Field Artillery Regiment (Zealand Artillery Regiment), merged with 1st Field Artillery Regiment in 1982 to form the King's Artillery Regiment.
- 3rd Field Artillery Regiment (North Jutland Artillery Regiment), merged with 4th Field Artillery Regiment in 2000 to form the Queen's Artillery Regiment.
- 4th Field Artillery Regiment (South Jutland Artillery Regiment), merged with 3rd Field Artillery Regiment in 2000 to form the Queen's Artillery Regiment.
- King's Artillery Regiment (1982–2005), merged with Queen's Artillery Regiment in 2005 to form the Danish Artillery Regiment.
- Queen's Artillery Regiment (2000–2005), merged with King's Artillery Regiment in 2005 to form the Danish Artillery Regiment.
- Danish Artillery Regiment (2005–2014, 2019–), disbanded in 2014 and reformed into 1st Danish Artillery Battalion. Reactivated on 1 January 2019.

=== Air Defence ===
- Zealand Air Defence Regiment (1932–1970), merged into Crown's Artillery Regiment
- Jutland Air Defence Regiment (1951–1974), merged into North Jutland Artillery Regiment

=== Armour ===
See under Cavalry units

=== Aviation ===
- Army Aviation Troops (1912–1950).
- Army Air Corps (1971–2003), amalgamated into Squadron 724 of the Royal Danish Air Force.

=== Engineers ===
- Zealand Engineer Regiment, merged with Jutland Engineer Regiment in 1997 to form the Engineer Regiment.
- Jutland Engineer Regiment, merged with Zealand Engineer Regiment in 1997 to form the Engineer Regiment.
- Engineer Regiment (1997–present)

=== Logistic ===
- Army Materiel Command (1602–2007) merged with navy and air force counterpart to form Defence Acquisition and Logistics Organization.
- Zealand Logistic Regiment (1951–1997), merged with Jutland Logistic Regiment to form the Logistic Regiment.
- Jutland Logistic Regiment (1951–1997), merged with Zealand Logistic Regiment to form the Logistic Regiment.
- Logistic Regiment (1997–present).
- Danish International Logistic Center (2001–2014), merged into Train Regiment.

=== Signal ===
- Zealand Signal Regiment, merged with Jutland Signal Regiment in 1992 to form the Signal Regiment.
- Jutland Signal Regiment, merged with Zealand Signal Regiment in 1992 to form the Signal Regiment.
- Command Support Regiment (1992–present).

=== Other ===
- Bornholm Regiment, disbanded 2000 and reactivated 2025
- Army Military Police (1947–2014), merged with Navy and Air force Military Police.
- Intelligence Regiment (2014–present).
- Jaeger Corps (1961–2014), Now under command of SOKOM

== Regimental organization graphic 2026 ==
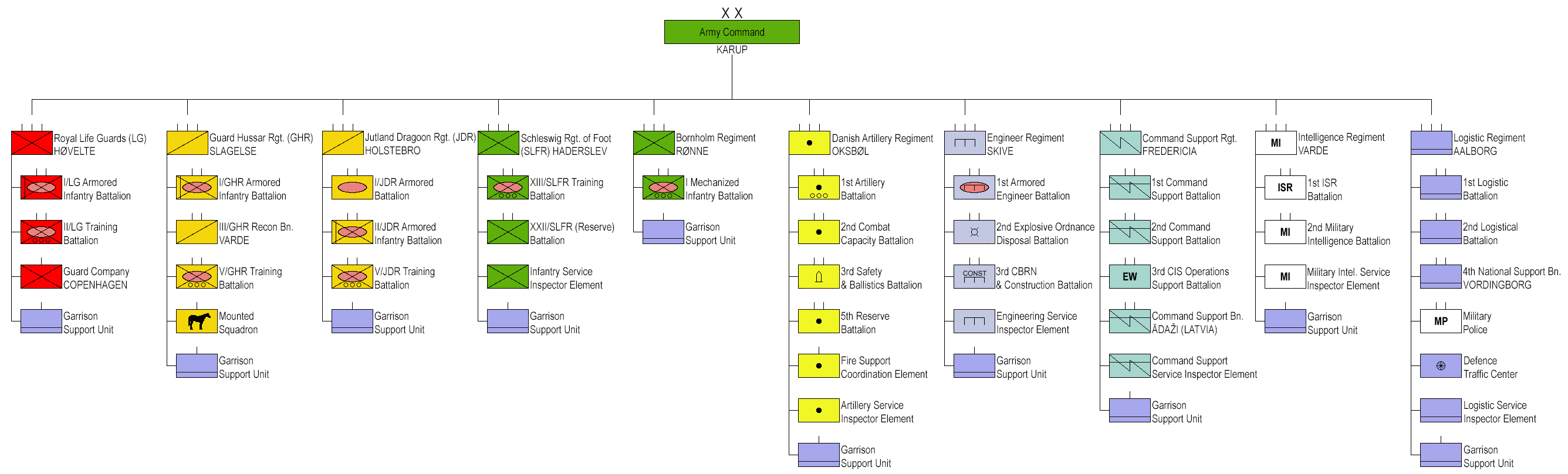
Royal Danish Army - Regimental organization 2026

== See also ==
- Royal Danish Army
- List of wars involving Denmark
- Military history of Denmark
- Structure of the Royal Danish Army
