= List of Danish flags =

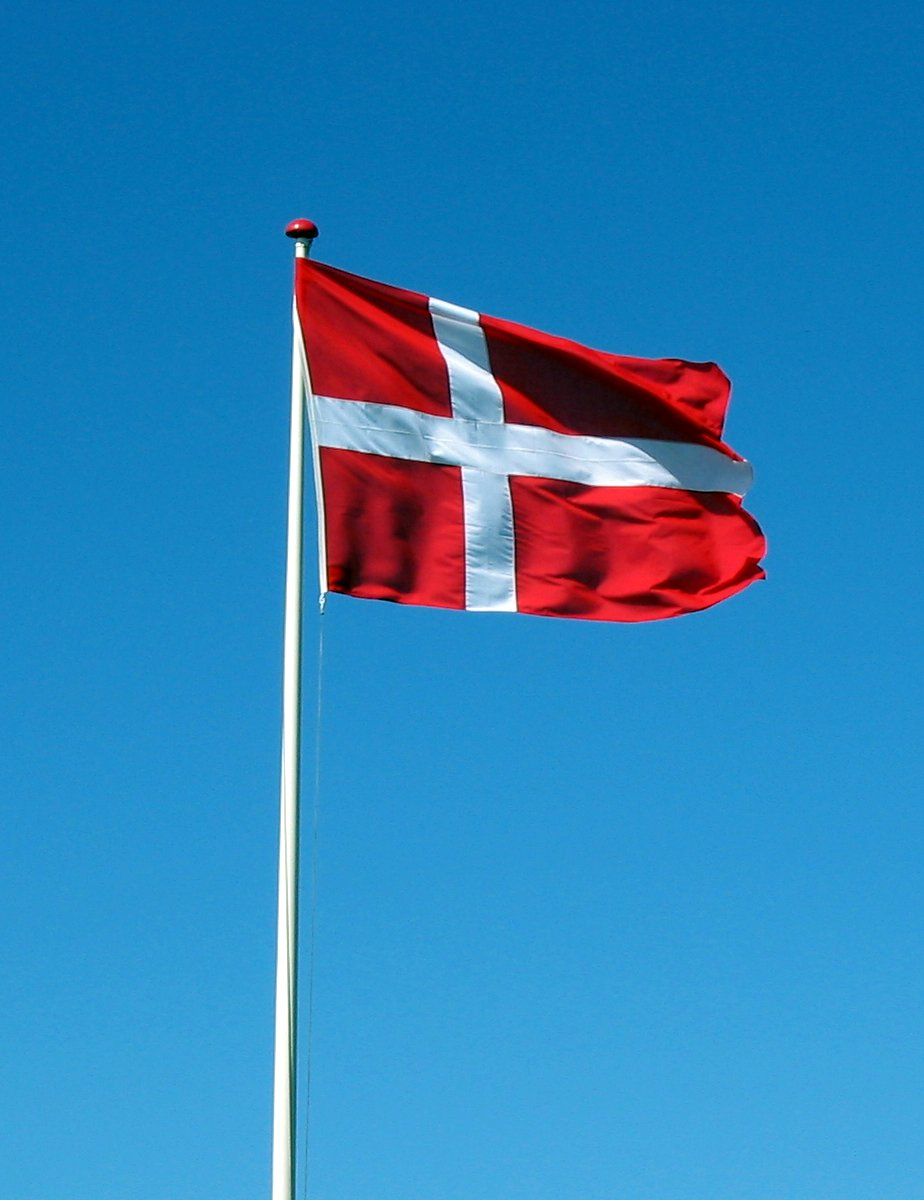
The Dannebrog the national flag of Denmark.

The following is a list of flags of Denmark.

== National flag and state flag ==
Flag	Date	Use	Description
	1219–present	Civil flag and ensign	A white Nordic cross on a red field
	?–present	State flag	
	?–present	Civil flag and ensign (vertical display)	

== Royal flags ==
Flag	Date	Use	Description
	2024–present	Royal standard of Denmark, used by King Frederik X	Royal flag with the greater (Monarch's) coat of arms
	2024–present	The flag of the Crown Prince of Denmark	Royal flag with the smaller (also: national) coat of arms.
	2024–present	Royal standard of Queen Mary	Royal flag with the coat of arms of Queen Mary
	1914–present	The flag of the temporary Regent of Denmark (in practice a member of the Royal House)	Royal flag with a royal crown (top), a sceptre and a sword (in saltire), and an orb (bottom) in the centre white square.
	?–present	Royal House standard (other members of the Royal Family)	Royal flag with a royal crown in the centre white square.
	1972–present	Royal pennant of the Monarch	A pentagonal (i.e. a square and a triangle combined) pennant. In the hoist a white square with the same coat of arms as the royal flag, in the fly, a triangle with swallow-tail, a red field with a white cross.
	?–present	Royal pennant	A pentagonal (i.e. a square and a triangle combined) pennant. In the hoist a white square with the lesser coat of arms (same as the crown prince's flag), in the fly, a triangle with swallow-tail, a red field with a white cross.

=== Historical royal flags ===
Flag	Date	Use	Description
	1972–2024	Royal standard of Denmark	Royal flag with the greater coat of arms of Denmark
	1948–1972	Royal standard of Denmark	Royal flag with the greater coat of arms of Denmark
	1903–1948	Royal standard of Denmark	Royal flag with the greater coat of arms of Denmark
	1819–1903	Royal standard of Denmark	Royal flag with the greater coat of arms of Denmark
	1731–1819	Royal standard of Denmark	Royal flag with the middle coat of arms of Denmark-Norway
	1948–2000	Royal standard of Queen Ingrid, The Queen Mother	
	1972–2002	The flag of Prince Henrik of Denmark	Royal flag with the arms of Prince Henrik.
	2002–2018	The flag of Prince Henrik of Denmark	Royal flag with the arms of Prince Henrik, with a prince's crown replaced by the royal crown.
	1914–2024	The flag of the Crown Prince of Denmark	Royal flag with the smaller (also: national) coat of arms.

== Military flags ==
=== Rank flags ===
Flag	Date	Use	Description
	?–present	Minister of Defence flag	Naval ensign with a crowned fouled anchor, placed in a centred white box.
	?–present	Rank flag for the Chief of Defence	State flag or naval ensign with two white staffs in saltire in the upper canton.
	1979–present	Rank flag for a general or an admiral	State flag or naval ensign with four stars equally split in the cantons of the hoist side.
	1979–present	Rank flag for a lieutenant general or a vice admiral	State flag or naval ensign with three stars, two in the upper canton and one in the lower.
	1979–present	Rank flag for a major general or a counter admiral	State flag or naval ensign with two stars equally split in the cantons of the hoist side.
	1979–present	Rank flag for a brigade general or a flotilla admiral	State flag or naval ensign with one star in the upper canton.

=== Army ===
Flag	Date	Use	Description
	1580–present	The Royal Danish Army uses the state flag.	
	2019–present	Danish Artillery Regiment colours	
	1997–present	Engineer Regiment colours	
	2026–present	Guard Hussar Regiment colours and standard	
	2019–present	Intelligence Regiment colours	
	2026–present	Jutland Dragoon Regiment standard	
	2026-present	Royal Life Guards colours	
	2019–present	Schleswig Regiment of Foot colours	
	2019–present	Signal Regiment colours	
	1990–present	Logistic Regiment colours	

==== Former regiments of the Royal Danish Army ====
Flag	Date	Use	Description
	1790–1842	Standard of the 10th Regiment	
	1785–1790	Standard of the 10th Regiment	
	1790–1819	Standard of the Danish Life Regiment	
	1785–1842	Standard of the Falster Regiment of Foot	
	1790–1808	Standard of the Funen Life Regiment	
	1749–1766	Standard of the Funen Life Regiment	
	1790–1842	Standard of the Jutlandic Regiment of Foot	
	1785–1790	Standard of the Jutlandic Regiment of Foot	
	1819–1842	Standard of the King's Regiment of Foot	
	1785–1819	Standard of the King's Regiment of Foot	
	?–1785	Standard of the King's Regiment of Foot	
	1790–1860	Standard of the Marine Regiment	
	1785–1790	Standard of the Marine Regiment	
	?–1785	Standard of the Marine Regiment	
	1790–1808	Standard of the Prince's Life Regiment	
	1753–1790	Standard of the Prince's Life Regiment	
	1810–1842	Standard of the Queen's Life Regiment	
	?–1790	Standard of the Queen's Life Regiment	
	1790–1808	Standard of the Zealand Life Regiment	
	1790–1842	Standard of the Schleswig Regiment of Foot	
	1779–1785	Standard of the Schleswig Regiment of Foot	
	1940s	Standard of the Danish volunteers in the Winter War	
	1940–1945	Standard of the SS-Schalburgkorps (part of Germanic SS during World War II, not part of Royal Danish Army)	
	1941–1943	Standard of the Free Corps Denmark (part of Germanic SS during World War II, not part of Royal Danish Army)	

=== Navy ===
Flag	Date	Use	Description
	<1585–present	Naval ensign	Like the state flag but the Royal Danish Navy uses flags with a darker hue than both the national and state flags.
	?–present	Chief of Defence staff flag	State flag with two white staffs in saltire in the first quarter.
	?–present	Rank flag for General admiral staff flag	
	?–present	Chief of Squadron flag	
	?–present	Senior Officer Afloat flag	
	1880s–?	Vice Admiral flag	
	1880s–?	Counter admiral flag	

== Customs services ==
Flag	Date	Use	Description
	1778–1814	Customs services flag	

== Flags of state-owned companies ==
Flag	Date	Use	Description
	?–present	Post Danmark	State flag with the logo of Post Danmark
	?–present	Danish State Railways	State flag with the logo of DSB

== Subnational flags ==
=== Autonomous entities ===
Flag	Date	Use	Description
	1985–present	Flag of Greenland	Two equal horizontal bands of white (top) and red with a large disk slightly to the hoist side of centre. The top half of the disk is red, the bottom half is white
	1940–present	Flag of the Faroe Islands	A red Nordic cross, surrounded by an azure-blue border and is set on a white field

=== Regions ===
The regions of Denmark do not have flags, instead using "logos" as symbols. These are sometimes misattributed as flags, and can be seen flown at times, but this is not the official use of them.

Capital Region of Denmark	Central Denmark Region	North Jutland Region	Region Zealand	Region of Southern Denmark

=== Unofficial regional flags ===
Some areas in Denmark have unofficial flags, listed below. The regional flags of Bornholm and Ærø are known to be in active use. The flags of Vendsyssel (Vendelbrog), the Jutlandic flag ("Den jyske fane"), and the flag of Funen ("Fynbo fanen") are obscure. None of these flags have legal recognition in Denmark, and are officially considered to be "fantasy flags". Denmark reserves official recognition to official flags and regional flags (områdeflag) from other jurisdictions.

Flag	Date	Use	Description
	1633–present	Unofficial flag of Ærø	Nine horizontal stripes of yellow, green, and red, repeated three times. Similar to the flag of Lithuania. A frequent interpretation is that the colours represent the kings of Denmark (red), the dukes of Schleswig (yellow) and the islands itself (green).
	1970s–present	Unofficial flag of Bornholm	Nordic cross flag in red and green. Also known in a version with a white fimbriation of the green cross in a style similar to design of the Norwegian flag.
	1975–present	Unofficial flag of Jutland	A Nordic cross flag in blue, green, and red. Designed by Per Kramer in 1975.
	1976–present	Unofficial flag of Vendsyssel	Nordic cross flag in blue, orange, and green. Designed by Mogens Bohøj.
	2015–present	Unofficial flag of Funen	There are two proposed flags: The green colour symbolises the island's importance as the 'pantry of Denmark'. The blue represents the island itself, and the red its strong ties to Denmark.

== Ethnic groups flags ==
Flag	Date	Use	Description
		Flag of North Schleswig Germans	

== Historical ==
Flag	Date	Use	Description
	1016–1035	North Sea Empire	The raven banner was used by Cnut the Great and many other Scandinavian rulers.
	Circa 1300s	State banner of the King of Denmark as depicted in the Gelre Armorial, the earliest representation of the Dannebrog.	
	Circa 1300s	Royal Banner	Yellow banner depicting the arms of the King of Denmark; three crowned lions with a semée of hearts.
	1430s	Kalmar Union	Emblems of the Kalmar Union
	1427	A medieval ship flag captured from a Danish ship by forces from Lübeck	

== House flags of Danish freight companies ==
Flag	Date	Use	Description
	1889–present	Dampskibsselskabet Torm	
	1866–2024	DFDS	
	1904–present	Maersk	
	1897–present	EAC Invest A/S	
	1902–1979	Danish-French Steamship Company^{da}	
	1879–1898	Thingvalla Line	

== Yacht clubs of Denmark ==
Flag	Date	Use	Description
	?–present	Ensign of Royal Danish Yacht Club	
	?–present	Ensign of Randers Sejlklub	
	?–present	Denmark Yacht ensign	

Flag	Club
	Aarhus Sejlklub
	Espergærde Sejlklub
	Faaborg Sejlklub
	Fredericia Sejlklub
	Gråsten Sejlklub
	Hellerup Sejlklub
	Horsens Sejlklub
	Kerteminde Sejlklub
	Kjøbenhavns Amatør-Sejlklub
	Kolding Sejlklub
	Royal Danish Yacht Club
	Middelfart Sejlklub
	Skovshoved Sejlklub
	Skælskør Amatør Sejlklub
	Taarbæk Sejlklub
	Thisted Sejlklub
	Yachtklubben Furesøen

== Other flags/microstate flags ==
Flag	Date	Use	Description
	1796–1848	In the flag books this is labelled 'Danish in West Indies'. No official sources can tell us what the flag was, and that the flag is *not* the colonial ensign of the Danish West India. However, he argues that the flag was hoisted as a courtesy ensign on the foretop mast by ships bound for the colony.	Dannebrog in the canton of a blue flag.
	1924	Flag of 2nd World Scout Jamboree	
	1971–present	Flag of Christiania	
	1944–present	Flag of Kingdom of Elleore	

== See also ==
- Flag of Denmark
- Coat of arms of Denmark
