= Structure of the Royal Danish Army =

This article lists the structure of the Royal Danish Army in 1989 and in November 2025:

== Organization 2025 ==
The Army Command (Danish: Hærkommandoen) is one of seven staffs of the Danish military's Joint Defense Command in Karup and headed by the Chief of the Army. The command controls all units of the Royal Danish Army and consists of about 110 persons, 40 of which are part of the Army Command's Army Support Unit.

- Army Command (Hærkommandoen), in Karup
  - Army Command's Army Support Unit (Hærkommandoens Hærstøtteenhed), in Karup

=== Multinational Division North ===
The NATO-assigned Multinational Division North is a joint Danish, Estonian and Latvian higher headquarters based in Ādaži near Latvia's capital Riga. In case of a crisis in the Baltic Region the division would take command of NATO reinforcements deployed to the region.

- Multinational Division North, in Ādaži (Latvia)
  - Division Staff, in Ādaži
    - Forward HQ Element, in Ādaži
    - Rear HQ Element, in Slagelse
  - Command Support Battalion, Command Support Regiment, in Ādaži and Fredericia
    - Multinational Staff, in Ādaži
    - Command Support Company (Royal Danish Army), in Fredericia
    - Force Protection Company (Estonian Army)
    - Logistic Support Company (Latvian Army), in Ādaži

=== 1st Brigade ===
The 1st Brigade (Danish: 1. Brigade - 1 BDE) is based in Holstebro and is the army's reaction force. Assigned to NATO's Response Force the brigade is able to deploy on short notice for international peace-making and peace-keeping operations.

- 1st Brigade (1. Brigade), in Holstebro
  - 1st Command Support Battalion, Command Support Regiment (1. Føringsstøttebataljon - 1 FOSTBTN), in Fredericia
    - Brigade Staff Company
    - Brigade CIS Company (Communications & Information Systems Company)
  - I Armoured Infantry Battalion, Royal Life Guards (I/LG Panserinfanteribataljon), in Høvelte
    - Staff Company
    - 1st Armoured Infantry Company, with CV9035DK infantry fighting vehicles
    - 2nd Mechanized Infantry Company, with Piranha V armored personnel carriers
    - 4th Mechanised Infantry Company (4/I/LG)
  - I Armoured Infantry Battalion, Guard Hussar Regiment (I/GHR Panserinfanteribataljon), in Slagelse
    - Staff Company
    - 1st Armoured Infantry Company, with CV9035DK infantry fighting vehicles
    - 2nd Mechanized Infantry Company, with Piranha V armored personnel carrier
    - 4th Mechanised Infantry Company (4/I/GHR)
  - II Armoured Infantry Battalion, Jutland Dragoon Regiment (II/JDR Panserinfanteribataljon), in Holstebro
    - Staff Company
    - 1st Mechanized Infantry Company, with Piranha V armored personnel carrier
    - 2nd Mechanised Infantry Company (Livkompagniet)
    - 4th Armoured Infantry Company, with CV9035DK infantry fighting vehicles
  - 1st Artillery Battalion, Danish Artillery Regiment (1. Artilleriafdeling - 1 AA), in Oksbøl
    - Staff Platoon
    - 1st Fire Support Battery, with 6 × ATMOS 2000 8x8 self-propelled howitzers, 4 × Cardom 10 120 mm mortars mounted on Piranha V
    - 2nd Fire Support Battery, with 6 × ATMOS 2000 8x8 self-propelled howitzers, 4 × Cardom 10 120 mm mortars mounted on Piranha V
    - 3rd Fire Support Battery, with 6 × ATMOS 2000 8x8 self-propelled howitzers, 4 × Cardom 10 120 mm mortars mounted on Piranha V
  - 1st Armoured Engineer Battalion, Engineer Regiment (1. Panseringeniørbataljon - 1 PNIGBTN), in Skive
    - Staff Company
    - 1st Armoured Engineer Company, with 8 × Piranha V, 2 × Leguan/AVLB and 2 × AEV
    - 2nd Armoured Engineer Company, with 8 × Piranha V, 2 × Leguan/AVLB and 2 × AEV
    - 3rd Armoured Engineer Company, with 8 × Piranha V, 2 × Leguan/AVLB and 2 × AEV
  - 1st Intelligence, Surveillance and Reconnaissance Battalion (1. ISR-bataljon - 1 ISRBTN), in Varde
    - Staff Platoon
    - Unmanned Aerial Vehicles Company, with 8 × Piranha V
    - Electronic Warfare Company, in Fredericia, with 16 × Piranha V
    - Light Reconnaissance Squadron
  - 1st Logistic Battalion, Logistic Regiment (1. Logistikbataljon - 1 LOGBTN), in Aalborg
    - Staff Platoon
    - 1st Supply Company
    - 2nd Medical Company
    - 3rd Maintenance Company
    - 4th Transport Company
  - 1st Military Police Company (allocated from the Military Police)

=== 2nd Brigade ===
The 2nd Brigade (Danish: 2. Brigade - 2 BDE) is based in Slagelse and consists of five battalions. The brigade is responsible for the training and tactical development of the army's reconnaissance, tank and light infantry formations, and the training of the army's reserve personnel.

- 2nd Brigade, in Slagelse
  - I Armoured Battalion, Jutland Dragoon Regiment (I/JDR Panserbataljon), in Holstebro
    - Staff Squadron
    - 1st Tank Squadron, with 14 × Leopard 2A7DK main battle tanks
    - 2nd Tank Squadron, with 14 × Leopard 2A7DK main battle tanks
    - 3rd Tank Squadron, with 14 × Leopard 2A7DK main battle tanks
  - V Training Battalion, Guard Hussar Regiment (V/GHR Uddannelsesbataljon), in Slagelse
    - 1st Training Company
    - 2nd Training Company
    - 4th Mechanized Infantry Company, with Piranha III armoured fighting vehicles
  - V Training Battalion, Jutland Dragoon Regiment (V/JDR Uddannelsesbataljon), in Holstebro
    - 1st Training Squadron
    - 2nd Training Squadron
    - 3rd Mechanized Infantry Company, with Piranha III armoured fighting vehicles
  - XIII Light Infantry Battalion, Schleswig Regiment of Foot (XIII/SLFR Lette Infanteribataljon), in Haderslev
    - Staff Company
    - 1st Light Infantry Company
    - 2nd Light Infantry Company
    - 3rd Light Infantry Company
    - 4th Training Company

=== Danish Artillery Regiment ===
The Danish Artillery Regiment (Danish: Danske Artilleriregiment - DAR) provides the army with artillery units and manages the ammunition development. The regiment is also developing new air-defense capabilities for the army.

- Danish Artillery Regiment, in Oksbøl
  - 1st Artillery Battalion (1. Artilleriafdeling - 1 AA), in Oksbøl — assigned to 1st Brigade
  - 2nd Combat Capacity Battalion (2. Kapacitetsafdeling - 2 KAP), in Oksbøl
    - 1st Training Battery
    - 4th Air-defense Battery
    - 5th Artillery Training Battery
    - Combat and Simulation Section (KAMPSIM)
  - 3rd Safety and Ballistics Battalion (3. Sikkerheds- og Ballistikafdeling - 3 SIKBAL), in Oksbøl
    - Direct Fire Ammunition Section
    - Indirect Fire Ammunition Section
    - Shooting Range Inspectorate
  - 5th Reserve Battalion (5. Reserveafdeling), in Oksbøl
  - Artillery Service Inspector Element
  - Fire Support Coordination Element (Joint terminal attack controller)
  - Garrison Support Unit

=== Engineer Regiment ===
The Engineer Regiment (Danish: Ingeniørregimentet - IGR) trains troops and provides units in the combat engineers, ordnance disposal, construction, geospatial and CBRN Defense specialities.

- Engineer Regiment, in Skive
  - 1st Armoured Engineer Battalion (1. Panseringeniørbataljon - 1 PNIGBTN), in Skive — assigned to 1st Brigade
  - 2nd Explosive Ordnance Disposal Battalion (2 EOD–bataljon - 2 EODBTN), in Skive
    - 5th Explosive Ordnance Disposal Company
    - 6th Training Company
    - 7th Training Company
    - Engineer Training Company
  - 3rd CBRN & Construction Battalion (3. CBRN- & Konstruktionsbataljon - 3 CBRN & KONSTBTN), in Skive
    - 3rd Construction Company
    - 4th CBRN Defense & Geospatial Company
  - Engineering Service Inspector Element
  - Garrison Support Unit

=== Command Support Regiment ===
The Command Support Regiment (Danish: Føringsstøtteregimentet - FSR) provides headquarters and communication information system (CIS) capabilities to the Royal Danish Army, Royal Danish Air Force, Royal Danish Navy, Joint Arctic Command, Special Operations Command and NATO.

- Command Support Regiment, in Fredericia
  - 1st Command Support Battalion (1. Føringsstøttebataljon - 1 FOSTBTN), in Fredericia — assigned to 1st Brigade
  - 2nd Command Support Battalion (2. Føringsstøttebataljon - 2 FOSTBTN), in Fredericia
    - 1st DCM-E Company (Danish Deployable Communications & Information Systems Module, Echo Company)
    - 2nd CIS Company (Communications & Information Systems Company)
    - 3rd Training Company
  - 3rd CIS Operations Support Battalion (3. CIS Operationsstøttebataljon - 3 CISOPSBTN), in Fredericia
    - Implementation
    - Frequency Section
    - Joint Communication
    - CIS Operations Centre
    - Federated Mission Networking
    - Training
  - Command Support Battalion, in Ādaži (Latvia) and Fredericia — assigned to Multinational Division North
  - Command Support Service Inspector Element
  - Garrison Support Unit

=== Intelligence Regiment ===
The Intelligence Regiment (Danish: Efterretningsregimentet - EFR) based in Varde provides the army with military intelligence, and tactical and strategic reconnaissance capabilities.

- Intelligence Regiment, in Varde
  - 1st Intelligence, Surveillance and Reconnaissance Battalion (1. ISR-bataljon - 1 ISRBTN), in Varde — assigned to 1st Brigade
  - 2nd Military Intelligence Battalion (2. Military Intelligence Bataljon - 2 MIBTN), in Varde
    - Information Activities Company (PSYOPS)
    - Human Intelligence Company (HUMINT & CIMIC)
    - Training Company
    - Intelligence Fusion Cell
      - Collection, Coordination & Intelligence Requirements Management section (CCIRM)
      - All Source Analysis Cell (ASAC)
      - Exploitation section (TECHINT)
  - Military Intelligence Service Inspector Element
  - Garrison Support Unit

=== Logistic Regiment ===
The Logistic Regiment (Danish: Trænregiment) based in Aalborg is the military logistics regiment of the Royal Danish Army, providing supply, transport, and medical services.

- Logistic Regiment, in Aalborg
  - 1st Logistic Battalion (1. Logistikbataljon - 1 LOGBTN), in Aalborg — assigned to 1st Brigade
  - 2nd Logistic Battalion (2. Logistikbataljon - 2 LOGBTN), in Aalborg
    - 1st Training Company
    - 2nd Training Company
    - 3rd Logistic Training Company
  - 4th National Support Battalion (4. Nationale Støttebataljon - 4 NSBTN), in Vordingborg
    - 1st National Support Element
    - 2nd National Support Element
    - 3rd National Support Element
    - 4th National Support Element
    - 5th National Support Element (Training)
  - Military Police (Militærpolitiet - MP), in Aalborg
    - 1st Military Police Company — assigned to 1st Brigade
    - 2nd Military Police Company
    - Military Police School
    - Military Police Guards
  - Defense Traffic Center, in Aalborg
    - Traffic Section
    - Defense Vehicle Inspection
    - Defense Driving School
  - Logistic Service Inspector Element
  - Garrison Support Unit

=== Royal Life Guards ===
The Royal Life Guards (Danish: Den Kongelige Livgarde - LG) is a regiment based in Høvelte and consists of two battalions and one company. The regiment's I Battalion is operationally assigned to the 1st Brigade, while the II Battalion is a training unit. The regiment's Guard Company is based at the Rosenborg Barracks on Gothersgade street in central Copenhagen and guards the Danish royal family's residences.

- Royal Life Guards, in Høvelte
  - I Armoured Infantry Battalion, Royal Life Guards (I/LG Panserinfanteribataljon), in Høvelte — assigned to 1st Brigade
  - II Training Battalion, Royal Life Guards (II/LG Uddannelsesbataljon), in Høvelte
    - 1st Mechanized Infantry Company, with Piranha III armoured fighting vehicles
    - 2nd Training Company
    - 3rd Training Company
  - Guard Company (Vagtkompagniet), in Copenhagen
    - Staff, 4 × guard platoons, a supply platoon, and a drum corps
  - Royal Life Guards Music Corps (Den Kongelige Livgarde Musikkorps - LMUK), in Copenhagen
  - Garrison Support Unit

=== Guard Hussar Regiment ===
The Guard Hussar Regiment (Danish: Gardehusarregimentet - GHR) is based in Slagelse and consists of three battalions, I and II Battalions which are operationally assigned to the 1st Brigade, and V Battalion, which is assigned to the 2nd Brigade. The regiment's III Battalion is the army's only reconnaissance unit. The regiment's Mounted Squadron provides mounted escorts for the Danish royal family and for Royal Danish Army ceremonies.

- Guard Hussar Regiment, in Slagelse
  - I Armoured Infantry Battalion, Guard Hussar Regiment (I/GHR Panserinfanteribataljon), in Slagelse — assigned to 1st Brigade
  - V Training Battalion, Guard Hussar Regiment (V/GHR Uddannelsesbataljon), in Slagelse — assigned to 2nd Brigade
  - Horse Squadron (Hesteskadron - HESK), in Slagelse
  - Garrison Support Unit

=== Jutland Dragoon Regiment ===
The Jutland Dragoon Regiment (Danish: Jydske Dragonregiment - JDR) is based in Holstebro and consists of three battalions, which are operationally assigned to 1st Brigade respectively 2nd Brigade. The regiment's I Armoured Battalion is the army's only unit equipped with main battle tanks.

- Jutland Dragoon Regiment, in Holstebro
  - I Armoured Battalion, Jutland Dragoon Regiment (I/JDR Panserbataljon), in Holstebro — assigned to 2nd Brigade
  - II Armoured Infantry Battalion, Jutland Dragoon Regiment (II/JDR Panserinfanteribataljon), in Holstebro — assigned to 1st Brigade
  - V Training Battalion, Jutland Dragoon Regiment (V/JDR Uddannelsesbataljon), in Holstebro — assigned to 2nd Brigade
  - Garrison Support Unit

=== Schleswig Regiment of Foot ===
The Schleswig Regiment of Foot (Danish: Slesvigske Fodregiment - SLFR) was reactivated on 1 January 2019 to manage the military base in Haderslev, home of the regiment's XIII Battalion, which is operationally assigned to the 2nd Brigade. As of 2024, XIII Battalion is no longer a training battalion, and is now a light infantry battalion.

- Schleswig Regiment of Foot, in Haderslev
  - XIII Light Infantry Battalion, Schleswig Regiment of Foot (XIII/SLFR Lette Infanteribataljon), in Haderslev — assigned to 2nd Brigade
  - XXII Reserve Battalion, Schleswig Regiment of Foot (XXII/SLFR Reservebataljon), in Haderslev
  - Schleswig Music Corps (Slesvigske Musikkorps - SMuK), in Haderslev
  - Infantry Service Inspector Element
  - Garrison Support Unit

=== Bornholm Regiment ===
The Bornholm Regiment (Danish: Bornholms Regiment) was reactivated on 12 June 2025 to strengthen the defence of Bornholm island.

- Bornholm Regiment, in Rønne
  - I Mechanized Infantry Battalion, Bornholm Regiment, in Rønne
    - Staff Company
    - 1st Mechanized Infantry Company, with Patria 6×6 armored personnel carrierss
    - 2nd Mechanized Infantry Company, with Patria 6×6 armored personnel carriers
    - 3rd Mechanized Infantry Company, with Patria 6×6 armored personnel carriers
  - Garrison Support Unit

== Army organization graphic ==
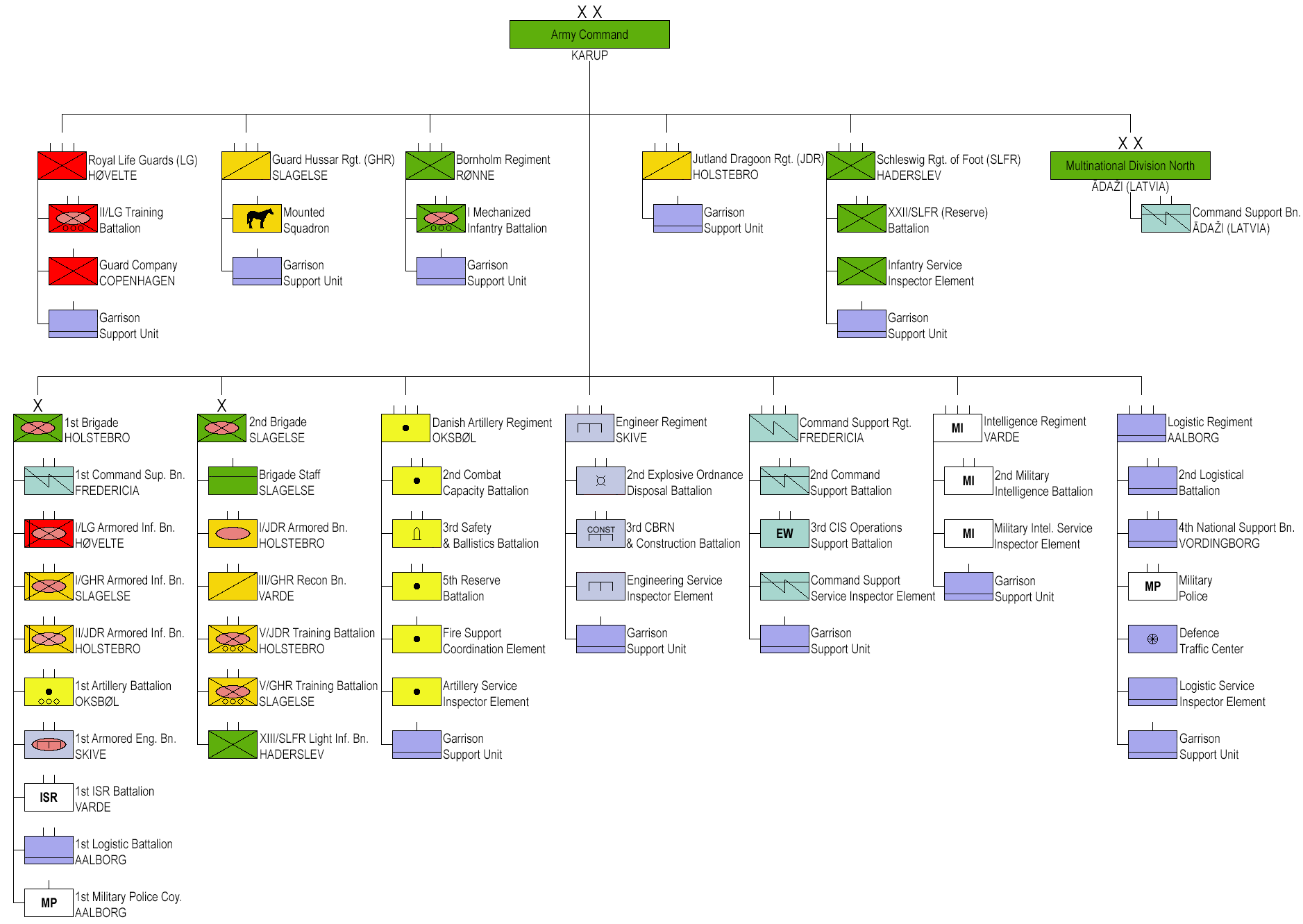
Royal Danish Army operational organization 2026

== Geographic distribution of units ==
Royal Danish Army unit locations 2020
Infantry Cavalry Artillery Engineers Signals Intelligence Logistics

== Organization 1989 ==
The army headquarters was located in Karup and tasked to train, maintain and prepare the army for war. However operational control in peacetime rested with the Western and the Eastern Regional Command. In wartime the former would have transferred its units to LANDJUT, while the latter would have become the LANDZEALAND command.

- Headquarters in Karup
  - Jaegerkorpset, at Aalborg Air Base, (Long range reconnaissance and special operations)
  - Army Material Command, Hjørring
    - Army Depot Service
    - Army Maintenance Service
    - Army Ammunition Arsenal

=== Western Regional Command ===
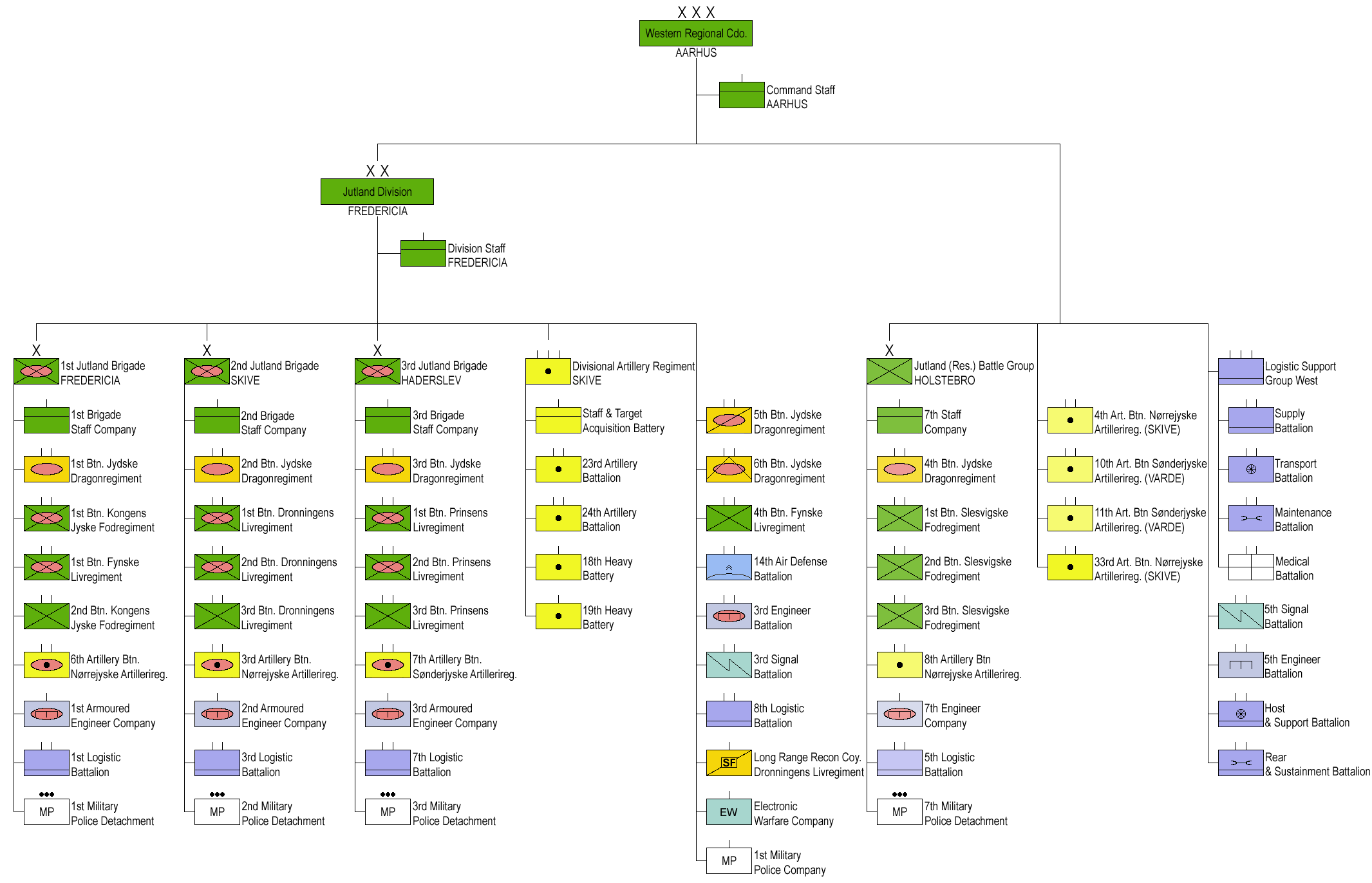
Structure of the Western Regional Command in 1989 (click to enlarge)

Western Regional Command units in 1989
Brigades Battle Groups (Reserve) Corps Artillery

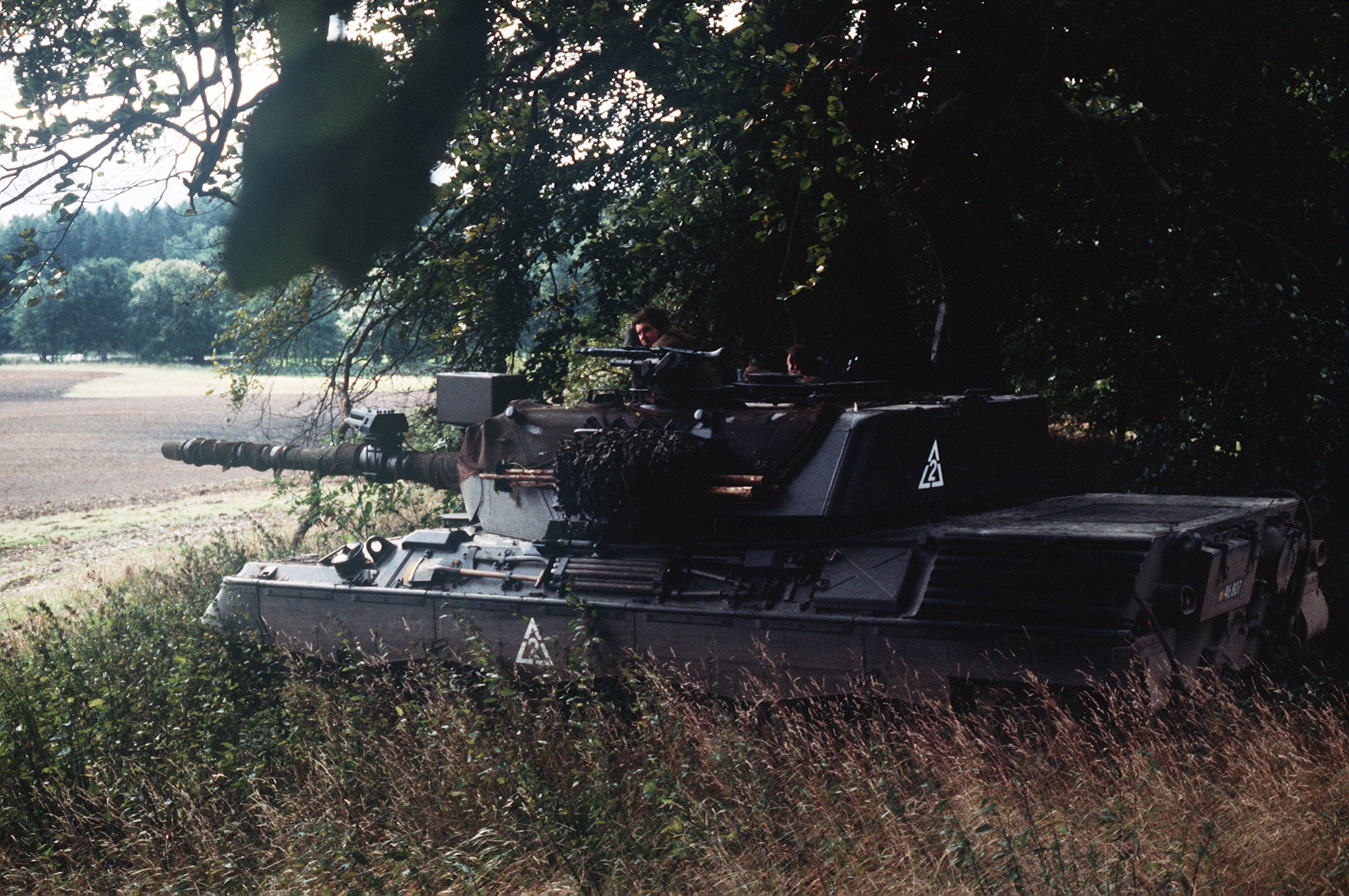
A Danish Leopard 1A3 during an exercise in 1984.

The Western Regional Command was based in Aarhus and commanded by a major general. In case of war it would have transferred command of all its units to NATO's Commander, Allied Land Forces Schleswig-Holstein and Jutland (LANDJUT). The command was responsible for the South Jutland, Ribe, Vejle, Ringkjøbing, Viborg, North Jutland and Aarhus counties, which together form the Danish part of the Jutland peninsula, and also for the island of Funen, which with the surrounding islands formed the Funen County.

- Western Regional Command, Aarhus
  - Jutland Division, Fredericia
    - 3rd Signal Battalion
    - 1st Jutland Brigade, Fredericia
      - 1st Brigade Staff Company (5 × M113, 8 × TOW on Land Rover)
      - 1st Battalion, Jydske Dragonregiment, (20 × Leopard 1A3, 21 × M113 (including 4 with TOW), 4 × M125 mortar carriers, 2 × TOW on Land Rover)
      - 1st Battalion, Kongens Jyske fodregiment(10 × Leopard 1A3, 32 × M113 (including 4 with TOW), 4 × M125, 4 × TOW on Land Rover)
      - 1st Battalion, Fynske Livregiment, (10 × Leopard 1A3, 32 × M113 (including 4 with TOW), 4 × M125, 4 × TOW on Land Rover)
      - 6th Artillery Battalion, Nørrejyske Artilleriregiment, (12 × M109A3 howitzer, 8 × M114/39 155 mm howitzer, 15 × M113)
      - 1st Armoured Engineer Company (6 × M113)
      - 1st Logistic Battalion
      - 1st Military Police Detachment
    - 2nd Jutland Brigade, Skive
      - 2nd Brigade Staff Company (5 × M113, 8 × TOW on Land Rover)
      - 2nd Battalion, Jydske Dragonregiment, (20 × Leopard 1A3, 21 × M113 (including 4 with TOW), 2 × M125)
      - 1st Battalion, Dronningens Livregiment, (10 × Leopard 1A3, 32 × M113 (including 4 with TOW), 4 × M125, 4 × TOW on Land Rover)
      - 2nd Battalion, Dronningens Livregiment, (10 × Leopard 1A3, 32 × M113 (including 4 with TOW), 4 × M125, 4 × TOW on Land Rover)
      - 3rd Artillery Battalion, Nørrejyske Artilleriregiment, (12 × M109A3 howitzer, 8 × M114/39 155 mm howitzer)
      - 2nd Armoured Engineer Company
      - 3rd Logistic Battalion
      - 2nd Military Police Detachment
    - 3rd Jutland Brigade, Haderslev
      - 3rd Brigade Staff Company (5 × M113, 8 × TOW on Land Rover)
      - 3rd Battalion, Jydske Dragonregiment, (20 × Leopard 1A3, 21 × M113 (including 4 with TOW), 2 × M125)
      - 1st Battalion, Prinsens Livregiment, (10 × Leopard 1A3, 32 × M113 (including 4 with TOW), 4 × M125, 4 × TOW on Land Rover)
      - 2nd Battalion, Prinsens Livregiment, (10 × Leopard 1A3, 32 × M113 (including 4 with TOW), 4 × M125, 4 × TOW on Land Rover)
      - 7th Artillery Battalion, Sønderjyske Artilleriregiment, (12 × M109A3 howitzer, 8 × M114/39 howitzer)
      - 3rd Armoured Engineer Company
      - 7th Logistic Battalion
      - 3rd Military Police Detachment
    - Divisional Artillery Regiment, Skive
      - Staff and Target Acquisition Battery
      - 23rd Artillery Battalion, (18 × M114/39 155 mm howitzer)
      - 24th Artillery Battalion, (18 × M114/39 155 mm howitzer)
      - 18th Heavy Battery, (4 × M115 203 mm howitzer)
      - 19th Heavy Battery, (4 × M115 203 mm howitzer)
    - 4th Battalion, Fynske Livregiment, (Motorized Infantry)
    - 5th Battalion, Jydske Dragonregiment, (Reconnaissance: 18 × M41 DK-1, 9 × M113, 9 × M125)
    - 6th Battalion, Jydske Dragonregiment, (Tank destroyer Battalion: 50 × Centurion Mk V (84 mm gun))
    - 33rd Artillery Battalion, Skive, Nørrejyske Artilleriregiment (18 × M59 155 mm gun, would have joined LANDJUT's Corps Artillery)
    - 14th Air Defence Battalion, (Stinger, Bofors 40 mm L/70)
    - 3rd Engineer Battalion
    - 8th Logistic Battalion
    - Long Range Reconnaissance Company, Dronningens Livregiment
    - Electronic Warfare Company
    - Heavy Transport Company
    - 1st Military Police Company
- Jutland Battle Group, Holstebro
  - 7th Staff Company
  - 4th Btn, Jydske Dragonregiment, (Motorized Infantry)
  - 3rd Btn, Kongens Jyske Fodregiment, (Motorized Infantry)
  - 4th Btn, Prinsens Livregiment, (Motorized Infantry)
  - 8th Artillery Btn, Nørrejyske Artilleriregiment, (6 × M114/39 155 mm howitzer, 12 × M101 105 mm howitzer)
  - 7th Engineer Company
  - 5th Logistic Battalion
  - 7th Military Police Detachment
- Territorial Command Jutland and Funen (VLK) in Fredericia
  - 5th Signal Battalion
  - 5th Engineer Battalion
  - LRRP Company (SEP/VLK (Homeguard))
  - Host and Support Battalion (Supporting arrival of NATO reinforcements in Jutland and northern Germany)
  - Rear and Sustainment Battalion
  - Logistics Support Group West (LSG-W)
    - Supply Battalion
    - Transport Battalion
    - Medical Battalion (incl. Medical Train)
    - Maintenance Battalion
    - Field Replacement Commando
  - 1st Territorial Region (Northern Jutland) in Aalborg
    - 3rd Btn, Dronningens Livregiment, (Infantry)
    - 15th Light Battery, Nørrejyske Artilleriregiment (8 × M101 105 mm howitzer)
    - Engineer Company
    - 6 × Homeguard Districts
      - 6 × Homeguard Staff Companies
      - 31 × Area Companies
      - 6 × Homeguard Military Police Companies
  - 2nd Territorial Region (Middle Jutland) in Viborg
    - 3rd Btn, Prinsens Livregiment, (Infantry)
    - 9th Light Battery, Nørrejyske Artilleriregiment (8 × M101 105 mm howitzer)
    - Engineer Company
    - 10 × Homeguard Districts
      - 10 × Homeguard Staff Companies
      - 56 × Area Companies
      - 10 × Homeguard Military Police Companies
  - 3rd Territorial Region (Southern Jutland) in Haderslev
    - 2nd Btn, Kongens Jyske Fodregiment, (Infantry)
    - 3rd Btn, Slesvigske Fodregiment, (Infantry)
    - 10th Artillery Battalion (Reserve), Varde, Sønderjyske Artilleriregiment (16 × M101 105 mm howitzer)
    - Engineer Company
    - 11 × Homeguard Districts
      - 11 × Homeguard Staff companies
      - 53 × Area Companies
      - 11 × Homeguard Military Police Companies
  - 4th Territorial Region (Funen) in Odense
    - 2nd Btn, Fynske Livregiment, (Motorized Infantry) incl Two Tank destroyer Squadron, (2 × 12 Centurion Mk V (84 mm gun))
    - 3rd Btn, Fynske Livregiment, (Infantry)
    - 11th Artillery Battalion (Reserve), Varde, Sønderjyske Artilleriregiment (16 × M101 105 mm howitzer)
    - Engineer Company
    - 5 × Homeguard Districts
      - 5 × Homeguard staff companies
      - 32 × Area Companies
      - 5 × Homeguard Military Police Companies

=== Eastern Regional Command ===
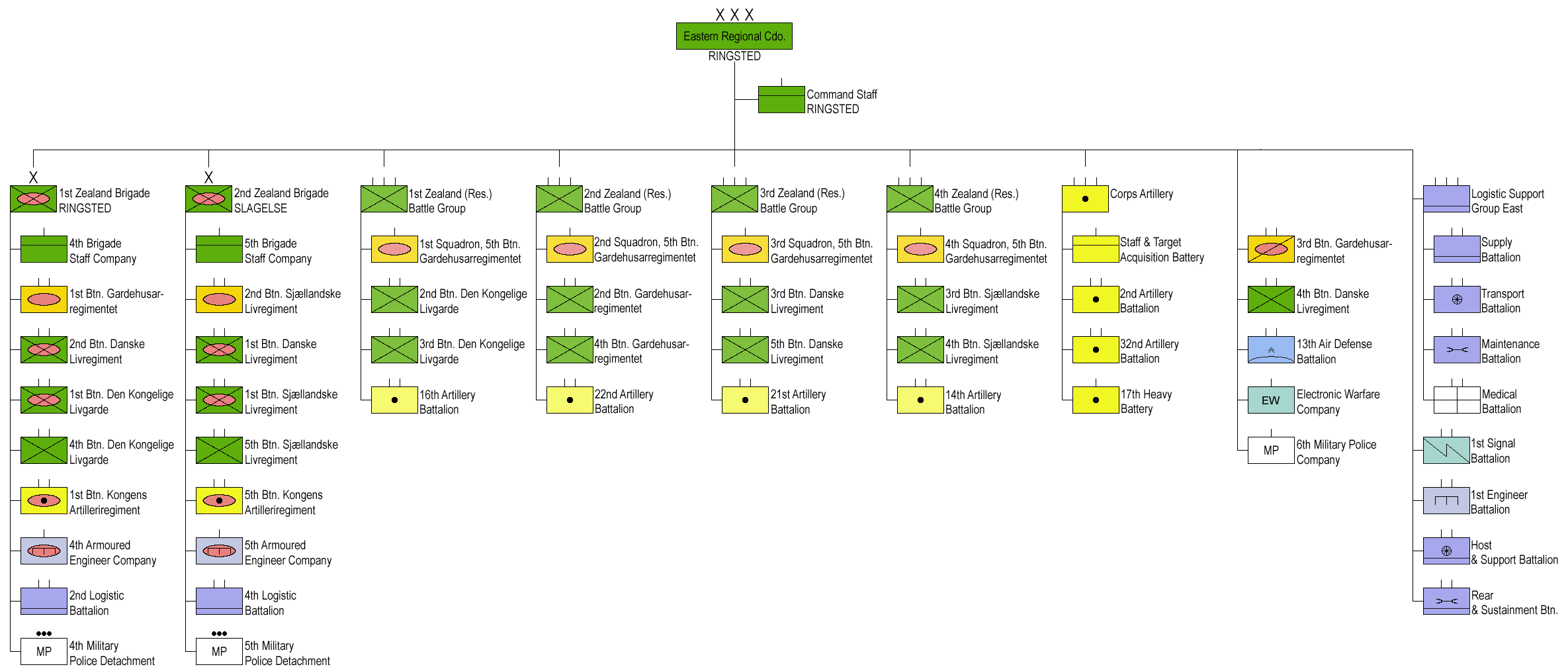
Structure of the Eastern Regional Command in 1989 (click to enlarge)

Eastern Regional Command units in 1989
Brigades Battle Groups (Reserve) Corps Artillery

The Eastern Regional Command was based in Ringsted and commanded by a major general, who in case of war would have become Commander, Allied Land Forces Zealand (LANDZEALAND). The command was responsible for the Copenhagen and Frederiksberg municipalities, and the Copenhagen, Frederiksborg, Roskilde, West Zealand and Storstrøm counties.

- Eastern Regional Command, Ringsted
  - 1st Signal Battalion
  - 1st Zealand Brigade
    - 4th Brigade Staff Company (5 × M113, 8 × TOW on Land Rover)
    - 1st Btn, Gardehusarregimentet, (30 × Centurion (105 mm L7 gun), 21 × M113 (including 4 with TOW), 2 × M125)
    - 2nd Btn, Danske Livregiment, (10 × Centurion (105 mm L7 gun), 32 × M113 (including 4 with TOW), 4 × M125, 4 TOW on Land Rover)
    - 1st Btn, Den Kongelige Livgarde, (10 × Centurion (105 mm L7 gun), 32 × M113 (including 4 with TOW), 4 × M125, 4 TOW on Land Rover)
    - 1st Btn, Kongens Artilleriregiment, (12 × M109A3, 8 × M114/39)
    - 4th Armoured Engineer Company
    - 2nd Logistic Battalion
    - 4th Military Police Detachment
  - 2nd Zealand Brigade
    - 5th Brigade Staff Company (5 × M113, 8 × TOW on Land Rover)
    - 2nd Btn, Sjællandske Livregiment, (30 × Centurion (105 mm L7 gun), 21 × M113 (including 4 with TOW), 2 × M125),
    - 1st Btn, Danske Livregiment, (10 × Centurion (105 mm L7 gun), 32 × M113 (including 4 with TOW), 4 × M125, 4 TOW on Land Rover)
    - 1st Btn, Sjællandske Livregiment, (10 × Centurion (105 mm L7 gun), 32 × M113 (including 4 with TOW), 4 × M125, 4 × TOW on Land Rover)
    - 5th Btn, Kongens Artilleriregiment, (12 × M109A3, 8 × M114/39)
    - 5th Armoured Engineer Company
    - 4th Logistic Battalion
    - 5th Military Police Detachment
  - Corps Artillery
    - Staff and Target Acquisition Battery
    - 2nd Artillery Battalion, (18 × M114/39 155 mm howitzer)
    - 32nd Artillery Battalion, (18 × M59 155 mm gun)
    - 17th Heavy Battery, (4 × M115 203 mm howitzer)
  - 3rd Btn, Gardehusarregimentet, (Reconnaissance: 18 × M41 DK-1, 12 × M113, 9 × M125)
  - 13th Air Defence Battalion, (Stinger)
  - 1st Engineer Battalion
  - 6th Logistic Battalion
  - Electronic Warfare Company
  - 6th Military Police Company
- 1st Zealand Battle Group
  - 1st Antitank Squadron Gardehusarregimentet, (8 × Centurion (84 mm gun))
  - 2nd Btn, Den Kongelige Livgarde, (Light Infantry)
  - 3rd Btn, Den Kongelige Livgarde, (Light Infantry)
  - 16th Artillery Battalion, (24 × M101)
- 2nd Zealand Battle Group
  - 2nd Antitank Squadron, Gardehusarregimentet, (8 × Centurion(84 mm gun))
  - 2nd Btn, Gardehusarregimentet, (Light Infantry)
  - 4th Btn, Gardehusarregimentet, (Light Infantry)
  - 22nd Artillery Battalion, (24 × M101)
- 3rd Zealand Battle Group
  - 3rd Antitank Squadron Gardehusarregimentet, (8 × Centurion(84 mm gun))
  - 3rd Btn, Danske Livregiment, (Light Infantry)
  - 4th Btn, Danske Livregiment, (Light Infantry)
  - 21st Artillery Battalion, (24 × M101)
- 4th Zealand Battle Group
  - 4th Antitank Squadron, Gardehusarregimentet, (8 × Centurion(84 mm gun))
  - 3rd Btn, Sjællandske Livregiment, (Light Infantry)
  - 4th Btn, Sjællandske Livregiment, (Light Infantry)
  - 14th Artillery Battalion, (24 × M101)

Territorial Command Zealand(ELK)

- 4th Signal battalion
- LRRP Company (SEP/ELK (Homeguard))
- Host and Support Battalion (Supporting arrival of NATO reinforcements on Zealand)
- Rear and Sustainment Battalion
- Logistics Support Group East (LSG-E)
  - Supply Battalion
  - Transport Company
  - Medical Battalion
  - Maintenance Battalion
  - Field Replacement Commando
- 5th Territorial Region (Zealand) in Ringsted
  - 5th Btn Den Sjællandske Livregiment, (Infantry)
  - 5th Region Engineer Company
  - 9 × Homeguard Districts
    - 9 × Homeguard Staff Companies
    - 50 × Area Companies
    - 9 × Homeguard Military Police Companies
- 6th Territorial Region (Northern Zealand/Copenhagen) in Copenhagen
  - 4th Btn Den Kongelige Livgarde, (Infantry, 6 compagnies) (Northern Zealand/Copenhagen)
  - Guard Company (Vagtkompagniet), Den Kongelige Livgarde, (Infantry) (Copenhagen, city)
  - Mounted Hussar Squadron, Gardehusarregimentet, (Infantry) (Copenhagen, city)
  - 6th Region Engineer Company
  - 4 × Homeguard Districts (Northern Zealand)
    - 4 × Homeguard Staff Companies
    - 15 × Area Companies
    - 4 × Homeguard Military Police Companies

=== Bornholms Værn ===
In wartime the island of Bornholm was, due to the long distance from Zealand, an independent command. Furthermore, agreements signed after World War II forbade the stationing on Bornholm or reinforcing of Bornholm, by foreign troops. Therefore, the island was only guarded by one Battle Group with a single active light infantry battalion. However, during the transition to war this Battle Group would have been augmented and reinforced by local reservists.

- Bornholms Værn's Battle Group
  - Staff and Signal Company
  - 1st Battalion, Bornholms Værn (infantry) (4 × TOW on Land Rover)
  - 2nd Battalion, Bornholms Værn (infantry) (reserve) (4 × TOW on Land Rover)
  - 3rd Battalion, Bornholms Værn (infantry) (reserve) (12 × 106 mm RR on Jeep M38)
  - Light Tank Squadron, "Bornholm Dragoons" (10 × M41 DK-1)
  - Light Reconnaissance Squadron (6 × M41 DK-1)
  - 12th Artillery Battalion (18 × M101)
  - Air Defence Battery (Stinger)
  - Motorized Engineer Company
  - Maintenance & Logistic Company
