= Danish Auxiliary Corps in Habsburg service 1701–1709 =

After having been forced to sue for peace with Sweden in 1700, the Danish army was much larger than the kingdom could support. The king then decided to put almost half of the army under Allied command during the War of the Spanish Succession. Ten thousand soldiers served as an auxiliary corps to the Habsburg monarchy, fighting under Eugene of Savoy in northern Italy, including the battles of Cremona and Luzzara. Later they participated in the suppression of the Hungarian insurgency.

== Background ==
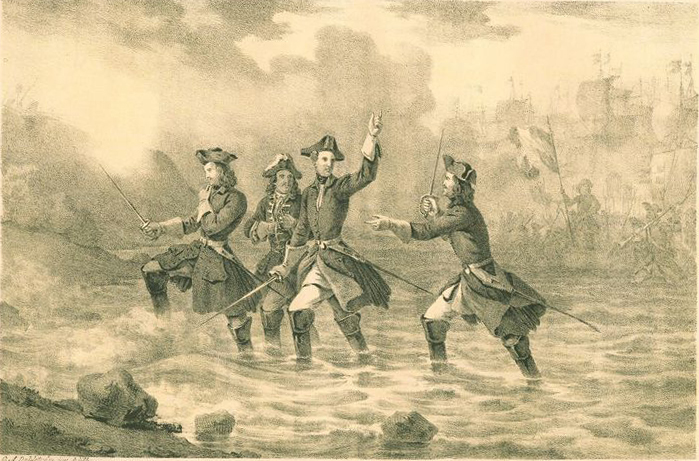
King Charles XII lands in Zealand in 1700.

The Swedish landing in Zealand forced Denmark-Norway out of the coalition that began the Great Northern War. Through the peace of Travendal Denmark-Norway had to return Holstein-Gottorp to its duke, a Swedish ally, and to leave the anti-Swedish alliance. The large Danish army prepared for a major war against Sweden, became a major burden on the Danish economy, when it couldn't, as anticipated, live off the enemy's land. Downsizing the army was not possible, since the Danish king wanted to retain the option of going to war with Sweden at some future date, in order to regain the provinces lost in the treaty of Roskilde 1658; moreover, it was well known in Europe of the time that unemployed soldiers might well turn into robbers. King Frederick V therefore decided to make more than half of the Danish army's 35,000 soldiers, two-thirds of which were enlisted in Germany, available to the Allied powers during the War of the Spanish Succession. Political goodwill thus gained, could in addition be useful in any future war with Sweden and Holstein-Gottorp.

Eight thousand soldiers were made available to the Habsburg monarchy through a defensive alliance between Denmark-Norway and the Holy Roman Empire. These troops were in 1701 garrisoned in Saxony, protecting the hereditary lands of August the Strong, who as king of Poland made war on Sweden, while his native Saxony technically was neutral. After the peace of Travendal this force were available for other duties. Another 2,000 soldiers were in 1703 recruited in Germany, and a Mecklenburg battalion in Danish service were transferred to Habsburg service. As compensation, Denmark would within six years receive the million rixdollars that the Habsburg emperor owed the Danish-Norwegian king since 1674. If a Habsburg prince would become king of Spain another million would be transferred to the Danish treasury.

== Italy ==
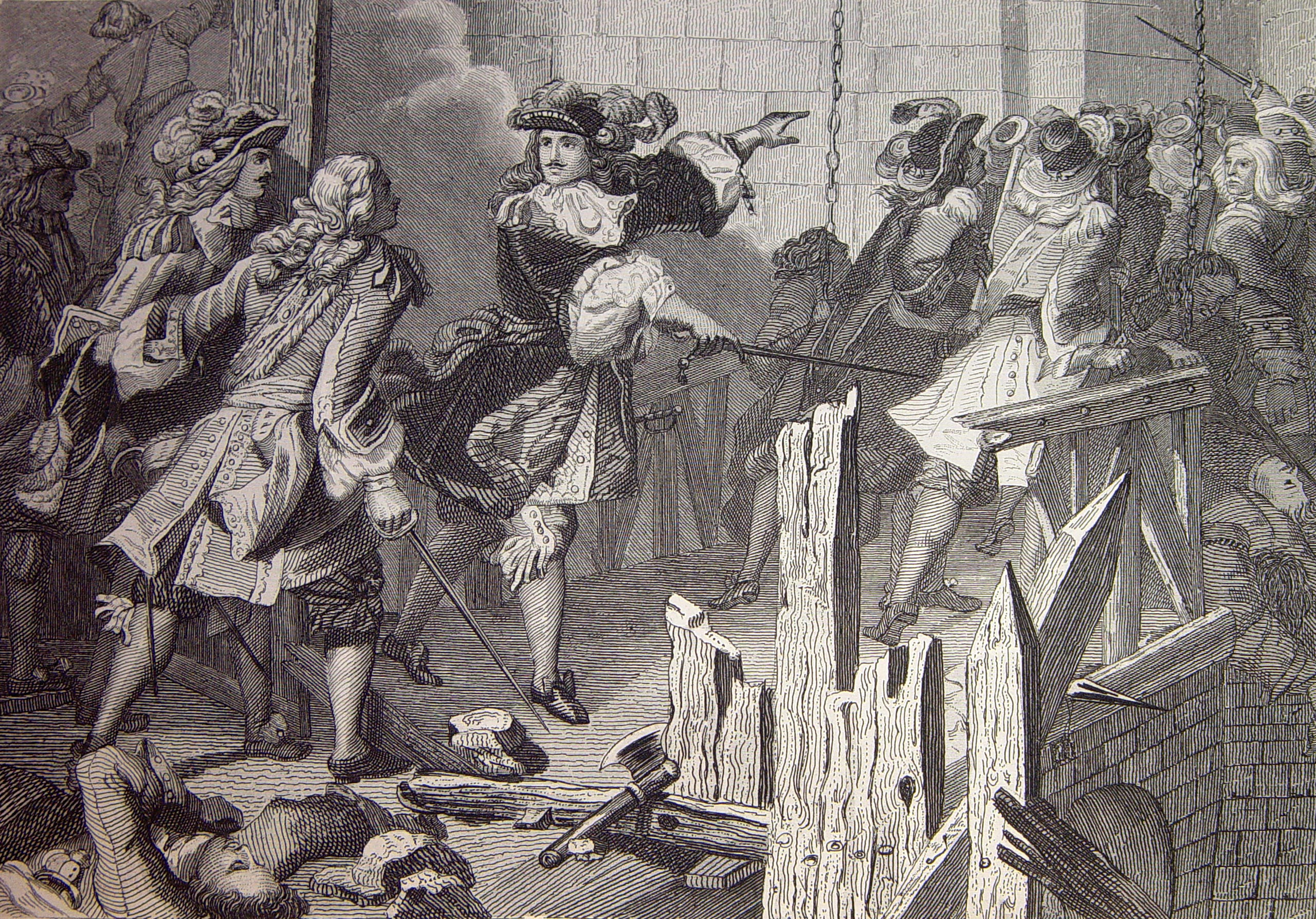
Battle of Luzzara.

The Danish corps consisted of two half-regiments of dragoons and seven infantry battalions, detached from their mother regiments, under the command of Ulrik Christian Gyldenløve with Ditlev Reventlow as second in command. It marched from Saxony in September 1701 and continued through Germany and Tyrol to Piacenza in northern Italy, arriving on New Year's Eve of 1701, joining a Habsburg army of about thirty thousand men under Eugen of Savoy besieging Cremona. Soon thereafter Eugen commanded that Cremona, with a French garrison of twelve battalions of infantry and twelve squadrons of cavalry, should be taken by a coup de main. Five hundred Austrian grenadiers infiltrated the city with the help of Habsburg minded citizens, and five hundred Danish soldiers crept into the city through its sewers during the night of February 1, 1702. At dawn, the Austrian and Danish soldiers in the city opened its gates for Habsburg forces that took control of its open spaces. But reinforcements never arrived on time, and the French managed to expel the Habsburg army from the city. Later the same year, the Danish corps participated in the siege of Mantua, which Eugen was forced to interrupt upon the arrival of a more numerous French army, and then in the bloody battle of Luzzara that followed. The Danish corps suffered large losses, especially in the last battle, and only half of the original force was fit to fight at the end of the year. In the winter quarters of 1703, the Danish corps was reorganized into one dragoon regiment and three infantry regiments. In the spring, the corps marched through the Tyrol to Linz where reinforcements arrived from Denmark.

== Hungary ==
After the arrival of the 1703 reinforcements, the Danish corps consisted of a cavalry regiment, a dragoon regiment, and four infantry regiments. It remained in Linz until the spring of 1704 when it marched to Hungary where it took part in the suppression of Rákóczys's Hungarian insurgency. The winter of 1704-1705 was spent living off the land in hostile Bavaria, where its maintenance did not burden the Habsburg treasury. In 1705, the corps returned to Hungary and renewed heavy fighting against the Kuruc. The following year, the corps combat value fell significantly when the Habsburg emperor no longer could afford to pay it. The king of Denmark-Norway therefore began diplomatic overturns to regain his troops. After long and tedious negotiations this was achieved, but it was not until the summer of 1709 that the Danish corps could leave Hungary. The Danish king, who planned to resume the war with Sweden, provided the corps with ample enlistment bounties, so that on their return to Denmark its full complement of soldiers were almost restored. The majority of the soldiery were now Germans and Hungarians.

== Order of Battle ==
Mother regiments	Auxiliary Corps	Reorganization of 1703
1st Dragoon Regiment	6 companies	Danske Dragon-Regiment
2nd Dragoon Regiment	6 companies	Danske Dragon-Regiment
Queen's Life Regiment	1 battalion	1st Danish Infantry Regiment
Prince Georges's Regiment	1 battalion	1st Danish Infantry Regiment
Prince Christian's Regiment	1 battalion	2nd Danish Infantry Regiment
Prince Carl's Regiment	1 battalion	2nd Danish Infantry Regiment
Sjællandske Regiment	1 battalion	3rd Danish Infantry Regiment
Jutlandic Regiment	1 battalion	3rd Danish Infantry Regiment
Marine Regiment	1 battalion	1/3 to each of the three new Danish infantry regiments
Reinforcements 1703
Ditmersens Cavalry Regiment	8 companies	--
4th Danish Infantry Regiment	2 battalions	--
Von Malzan's Mecklenburgske battalion	1 battalion	--

== Sources ==
- Bauer, Bruno (1843). Geschichte der Politik, Cultur und Aufklärung des achtzehnten Jahrhundert. Vol. 1. Charlottenburg: Verlag von Egbert Bauer.
- Gibler, Douglas M. (2009). International Military Alliances, 1648-2008. Washington, DC: CQ Press.
- Hirtenfeld, J.; Meinert, H. (1851). Oesterreichisches Militär-Conversations-Lexikon. Vol. 1. Wien.
- Hochedlinger, Michael (2013). Austria's Wars of Emergence, 1683-1797. London: Routledge.
- Höglund, Lars Erik; Sallnäs, Åke (2003). Stora Nordiska Kriget 1700-1721. Vol. II. Karlstad: Acedia Press.
- Martin, Henry (1865). Martin's History of France: The Age of Louis XIV. Vol. 2. Boston: Walker, Wise, and Company.
- Schels, Johann Baptist (1841). Biographie des Herzogs Ferdinand von Würtemberg. Wien: Braumüller und Seiden.
- Szabad, Emeric (1844). Hungary, past and present. Edinburgh: Adam and Charles Black.
- Tucker, Spencer C. (2010). A Global Chronology of Conflict. Santa Barbara: ABC CLIO.
- Vaupell, Otto (1872). Den dansk-norske hærs historie indtil 1814. Vol. 1. Gyldendalske boghandel.

== See also ==
- Danish Auxiliary Corps in Anglo-Dutch service 1701-1714
- Danish Auxiliary Corps in the Williamite War in Ireland
