= Western Regional Command (Denmark) =

- Vestre Landsdelskommando
- Coat of arms for the Western Regional Command
- Active: 1801–1923; 1950–1990
- Disbanded: 31 December 1990
- Country: Denmark
- Branch: Royal Danish Army
- Part of: (NATO) AFNORTH
- Garrison/HQ: Viborg; Århus

Insignia
- Flag

The Western Regional Command (Danish: Vestre Landsdelskommando) (known until 1923 as 2nd General Command (Danish: 2. Generalkommando)) was the overall command of all Royal Danish Army units in Jutland and on Funen. It was split into four military regions, and was responsible for the regional defence. In 1990, the Regional Commands were disbanded and control was collected at the newly created Army Operational Command.

== History ==
Originally named the General Command Northern Jutland, it was one of five General Commands. (Note: The others being the General Command in Norway and in the Duchies (1772–1848), the General Command of Funen (1801–1855), the General Command for Langeland, Ærø and Tåsinge (1807–1814) & the General Command for Zealand (1807, 1839-1854)) In 1855, it absorbed the General Command of Funen and was renamed the 2nd General Command. In 1923, the 2nd General Command was disbanded. Overall command was given to the Jutland Division in 1932.

In 1950, as part of expansive rebuilding and reorganization of the army, the General Command was revived as the Western Regional Command. In the beginning there was large focus on having a larger defence in Jutland and the 2nd General Command. However, after the West German rearmament, focus was sifted to the Eastern Regional Command. In case of war, the command would be placed under the control of the Allied Forces Northern Europe. Following the end of the Cold War, there was a political wish to reduce military spending along with greater centralization. This led to the Western Regional Command being disbanded in 1990 and control given to the newly created Army Operational Command.

== Structure ==
=== 2nd General Command ===
Structure in 1870 was:

Jutland

- 6th Battalion in Viborg
- 8th Battalion in Viborg
- 9th Battalion in Aalborg
- 10th Battalion in Fredericia
- 11th Battalion in Aalborg
- 12th Battalion in Fredericia
- 14th Battalion in Århus
- 20th Battalion in Århus
- 27th Reserve Battalion in Fredericia
- 28th Reserve Battalion in Århus
- 29th Reserve Battalion in Viborg
- 30th Reserve Battalion in Aalborg
- 3rd Dragoon Regiment in Århus
- 5th Dragoon Regiment in Randers

Funen

- 5th Battalion in Odense
- 7th Battalion in Nyborg
- 16th Battalion in Odense
- 19th Battalion in Nyborg
- 25th Reserve Battalion in Nyborg
- 26th Reserve Battalion in Odense
- 2nd Dragoon Regiment in Odense

=== Western Regional Command ===
The structure in 1950–1990 was:

- Jutland Division in Åbenrå (added in 1960)
- 1st Jutland Brigade in Fredericia (added in 1960)
- 2nd Jutland Brigade in Aalborg (added in 1960)
- 3rd Jutland Brigade in Fredericia (added in 1960)
- Jutland battle group (added in 1982)
- Military Region I, II, III & IV
- Schleswig Regiment of Foot in Haderslev
- Prince's Life Regiment in Viborg
- Funen Life Regiment in Odense
- Jutlandic Regiment of Foot in Fredericia (Disbanded in 1961)
- King's Jutlandic Regiment of Foot in Fredericia
- Queen's Life Regiment in Aalborg
- Field Lord's regiment of foot in Aalborg (Disbanded in 1961)
- Jutland Dragoon Regiment in Holstebro
- North Jutland Artillery Regiment in Århus
- Southern Jutland Artillery Regiment in Varde
- Jutlandic Air Defence Regiment in Tønder
- Jutlandic Logistic Regiment in Aalborg
- Jutlandic Engineer Regiment in Randers
- Jutlandic Signal Regiment in Århus

== Commanders ==
=== General Command Northern Jutland ===
No.	Portrait	Name (Birth–Death)	Term of office			Ref.
No.	Portrait	Name (Birth–Death)	Took office	Left office	Time in office	Ref.
1		Lieutenant general Adam Ludvig Moltke (1743–1810)	13 February 1801	March 1808	7 years	
2		Lieutenant general Johan Frederik Bardenfleth (1740–1811)	12 March 1808	4 January 1809	298 days	
3		Lieutenant general Carl Tellequist (1738–1817)	January 1809	April 1812	3 years, 3 months	
–		Lieutenant general Iver Christian Lasson (1754–1823) acting	2 April 1812	3 June 1813	1 year, 62 days	
4		Johann Theodor Wegener (1752–1819)	June 1813	8 March 1819 #	5 years, 9 months	
5		Lieutenant general Iver Christian Lasson (1754–1823)	March 1819	16 January 1823	3 years, 10 months	

=== General Command Northern Jutland, Funen and Langeland ===
No.	Portrait	Name (Birth–Death)	Term of office			Ref.
No.	Portrait	Name (Birth–Death)	Took office	Left office	Time in office	Ref.
1		Lieutenant general Frederik Castonier (1761–1838)	17 January 1823	20 May 1838	15 years, 123 days	
2		Lieutenant general Hereditary Prince Ferdinand (1792–1863)	21 May 1838	13 December 1839	1 year, 206 days	
3		Lieutenant general Crown Prince Frederick (1808–1863)	14 December 1839	20 January 1848	8 years, 37 days	
4		Lieutenant general Christian Høegh-Guldberg (1777–1867)	2 March 1848	18 April 1848	47 days	
5		Major general Carl Frederik Moltke (1784–1863)	18 April 1848	3 September 1848	138 days	
6		Major general Gerhard Christoph von Krogh (1785–1860)	4 September 1848	27 March 1849	204 days	
–		Colonel; Cai Pram Astrup (1785–1863) acting	27 March 1849	9 August 1849	135 days	
7		Lieutenant general Frederik Bülow (1791–1858)	9 August 1849	21 September 1849	43 days	
(5)		Major general Carl Frederik Moltke (1784–1863)	21 September 1849	24 May 1850	245 days	
(6)		Lieutenant general Gerhard Christoph von Krogh (1785–1860)	25 May 1850	30 June 1850	36 days	
–		Colonel; Julius Ferdinand Paludan (1794–1879) acting	1 July 1850	1 February 1851	215 days	

=== 2nd General command ===
No.	Portrait	Name (Birth–Death)	Term of office			Ref.
No.	Portrait	Name (Birth–Death)	Took office	Left office	Time in office	Ref.
1		Lieutenant general Carl Frederik Moltke (1784–1863)	9 February 1851	23 April 1858	7 years, 73 days	
2		Lieutenant general Christian de Meza (1792–1865)	23 April 1858	3 September 1863	5 years, 133 days	
3		Lieutenant general Hans Nicolai Thestrup (1794–1879)	4 September 1863	27 June 1864	297 days	
Disbanded 27 June 1864–1 December 1864
4		General; Peter Frederik Steinmann (1812–1894)	1 December 1864	25 August 1874	9 years, 267 days	
5		General; Ernst Wilster (1808–1881)	25 August 1874	14 December 1877	3 years, 111 days	
(4)		General; Peter Frederik Steinmann (1812–1894)	14 December 1877	3 April 1882	4 years, 110 days	
6		Lieutenant general Christian Bauditz (1815–1909)	3 April 1882	29 January 1885	2 years, 301 days	
7		Lieutenant general Stephan Ankjær (1820–1892)	31 January 1885	15 October 1888	3 years, 258 days	
8		Lieutenant general Ludolph Fog (1825–1897)	15 October 1888	14 October 1895	6 years, 364 days	
9		Lieutenant general Agathon Nickolin (1826–1910)	14 October 1895	21 November 1896	1 year, 38 days	
10		Lieutenant general Johannes Zeuthen Schroll (1831–1916)	27 November 1896	18 November 1897	356 days	
11		Lieutenant general Johan Frederik Lorenzen (1831–1907)	18 November 1897	25 February 1901	3 years, 99 days	
12		Lieutenant general Carl Meldahl (1835–1926)	25 February 1901	2 March 1905	4 years, 5 days	
13		Lieutenant general Mauritz Leschly (1841–1930)	2 March 1905	7 October 1911	6 years, 219 days	
14		Lieutenant general August Tuxen (1853–1929)	7 October 1911	6 August 1917	5 years, 303 days	
15		Lieutenant general Palle Berthelsen (1857–1920)	7 August 1917	7 November 1918	1 year, 92 days	
16		Lieutenant general Immanuel Lembcke (1854–1932)	7 November 1918	31 March 1923	4 years, 144 days	

=== Western Regional Command ===
No.	Portrait	Name (Birth–Death)	Term of office			Ref.
No.	Portrait	Name (Birth–Death)	Took office	Left office	Time in office	Ref.
1		Major general A. H. M. Wulff Have (1888–1967)	1 October 1950	14 July 1951	286 days	
2		Major general Thyge Karl Thygesen (1895–19??)	15 July 1951	31 August 1960	9 years, 47 days	
3		Major general Aage Højland Christensen (1901–1961)	1 September 1960	10 August 1961 #	343 days	
4		Major general Orla Nørberg (1903–2000)	1 September 1961	31 January 1968	6 years, 152 days	
5		Major general Hans Aksel Ib Pedersen (1910–1999)	1 February 1968	28 February 1975	7 years, 27 days	
6		Major general Aage D. Danhuus (1911–1986)	1 March 1975	31 July 1976	1 year, 152 days	
7		Major general Georg Asmussen (1920–1996)	1 August 1976	1982	5–6 years	
8		Major general Hieronymus Thomassøn Havning (1925–?)	1982	1984	1–2 years	
9		Major general Paul B. Krogen (1928–2005)	1984	1987	2–3 years	
10		Major general Holger Dencker (1923–?)	1987	1987	0 years	
11		Major general Wagn Andersen (1932–2020)	1987	1989	1–2 years	

== Names ==
Names
Generalkommando Nørrejylland	General Command Northern Jutland	1801	–	1839
Generalkommando Nørrejylland, Fyn og Langeland	General Command Northern Jutland, Funen and Langeland	1839	–	1855
2. Generalkommando	2nd General command	1855-10-17	–	1923
	Disbandment	1923	–	1925
Disbanded	Disbanded	1925	–	1950
Vestre Landsdelskommando	Western Regional Command	1950-10-01	–	1990-12-31
