= Logistic Regiment =

Logistic Regiment may refer to:

- Logistic Regiment (Denmark)
- Logistic Regiment (Sweden)
