= 2nd Dragoons =

The 2nd Dragoons or 2nd Dragoon Regiment may refer to:

- 2nd Dragoons, a British regiment usually known as the Royal Scots Greys
- 2nd Dragoons (Canada), a Canadian regiment that amalgamated into the 2nd/10th Dragoons
- 2nd Dragoon Regiment (Denmark)
- 2nd Dragoon Regiment (France)
- 2nd Cavalry Regiment (United States), also known as the 2nd Dragoons

== See also ==
- 2nd Dragoon Guards (Queen's Bays)
- 2nd Regiment (disambiguation)
