= Copenhagen Infantry Regiment =

- Københavns Infanteriregiment
- Regimental standard of the Copenhagen Infantry Regiment.
- Active: 1808–1816
- Country: Denmark–Norway
- Allegiance: Royal Dano-Norwegian Army
- Branch: Army
- Type: Infantry

Commanders
- Notable commanders: Johan Henrik Rye

The Copenhagen Infantry Regiment (Danish: Københavns Infanteriregiment) was an infantry regiment of Denmark-Norway active during the Gunboat War of the Napoleonic Wars.

== History ==
On 7 April 1808, the regiment was raised from three Marine battalions. It functioned as a defense and garrison force in Copenhagen. The regiment did not participate in any major combat during the Napoleonic Wars.

From 1808, there were multiple transfers of officers and other personnel, some from the Marine Regiment, to the Copenhagen Infantry Regiment.

On 28 October 1810, the Marine Regiment was incorporated into the Copenhagen Infantry Regiment.

In 1814, by order of King Frederick VI, a sapper company was established in the regiment, consisting of a company commander, a lieutenant, a second lieutenant, nine corporals, and 160 sappers. The regiment was disbanded on 1 February 1816.

== Uniforms and equipment ==
Soldiers of the regiment were equipped with the M1756 infantry sabre, which was also used by grenadiers, in the Marine Regiment, and the Norwegian Life Regiment. Soldiers wore a red coat with dark blue facing, straw-colored laces, and yellow buttons.
