= Jutland Division =

- Active: 1 Jun 1952 - 31 Dec 1996
- Country: Denmark
- Role: Mechanized infantry
- Size: Division
- Part of: Allied Forces Baltic Approaches; AFNORTH; Western Regional Command

The Jutland Division (Danish: Jyske Divisionskommando) was a mechanized infantry formation of the Danish Army during the Cold War. It was formed during 1951 to 1952 as 3rd Division from assets of the III Military Region and the division headquarters was initially located in Aabenraa. As initially formed, the division had only one active brigade (1st Brigade) and two reserve brigades (the 2nd and 3rd Brigades). The division changed its name to "Jutland Division" in 1961. In 1975, the division headquarters was moved to Fredericia and the 2nd and 3rd Brigades received full equipment sets. By 1979, each brigade was made up of two mechanized infantry battalions, a tank battalion, a self-propelled artillery battalion, and an armored reconnaissance squadron (company). In 1981 the three armored reconnaissance squadron was merged into V/JDR Reconnaissance Battalion.

In the event of war with the Soviet Union, the division would have defended Jutland against Soviet thrusts intended to sever Denmark from the rest of NATO. The division was part of the LANDJUT command and ultimately subordinated to NATO's AFNORTH command. With the end of the Cold War, the Danish Army reorganized, and the Jutland Division transformed into the Danish Division on 1 January 1997.

== Units ==
The division in the 1980s before it changed to Danish Division 1 January 1997.

Jutland Division (HQ Fredericia)

- 3rd Signal Battalion (support and run Division HQ)
- 1st Jyske Brigade (HQ Fredericia)
  - 1st Staff Company/KJFR,
  - I/FLR MechInfantry Battalion
  - II/PLR MechInfantry Battalion
  - I/JDR Armoured Battalion
  - 6th Artillery Battalion/NJAR (Armoured/Selfpropelled)
  - 1st Armoured Engineer Company
  - 7th Logistic Battalion
  - 1st MP detachment
- 2nd Jyske Brigade (HQ Skive)
  - 2nd Staff Company/NJAR
  - I/DRLR MechInfantry Battalion
  - II/DRLR MechInfantry Battalion
  - II/JDR Armoured Battalion
  - 3rd Artillery Battalion/NJAR (Armoured/Selfpropelled)
  - 2nd Armoured Engineer Company
  - 5th Logistic Battalion
  - 2nd MP detachment
- 3rd Jyske Brigade (HQ Haderslev)
  - 3rd Staff Company/SLFR
  - I/PLR MechInfantry Battalion
  - I/KJFR MechInfantry Battalion
  - III/JDR Armoured Battalion
  - 7th Artillery Battalion/SJAR (Armoured/Selfpropelled)
  - 3rd Armoured Engineer Company
  - 4th Logistic Battalion
  - 3rd MP detachment
- V/JDR Reconnaissance Battalion (Armoured)
- VI/JDR Anti-tank Battalion
- IV/FLR Motorized infantry Battalion
- Patrol Company/DRLR (Long Range/Light Reconnaissance)
- Division Artillery (HQ Skive)
  - Staff&Target-Acquisition Battery/NJAR
  - 23rd Artillery Battalions/NJAR (towed)
  - 24th Artillery Battalions/SJAR (towed)
  - 18th Heavy Battery/NJAR (Towed)
  - 19th Heavy Battery/NJAR (Towed)
- 14th Anti-aircraft rocket Battalion/SJAR
- 3rd Engineering Battalion
- 3rd Electronic Warfare Company
- 3rd Logistic Support Battalion
- 10th Supply Battalion
- Transport Company (Heavy transport)
- 2nd Military Police Company

== Commanders ==
=== First iteration (1932–1951) ===
No.	Portrait	Name (born–died)	Term of office			Ref.
No.	Portrait	Name (born–died)	Took office	Left office	Time in office	Ref.
1		Major General; Kaj Lauge Lasson (1872–1941)	1 November 1932	31 July 1937	4 years, 272 days	
2		Major General; Frederik Christian Essemann (1877–1954)	1 August 1937	1941	3–4 years	
3		Major General; Kristian Knudtzon (1888–1972)	8 October 1941	31 January 1946	4 years, 115 days	
4		Major General; A. H. M. Wulff Have (1888–1967)	1 February 1946	1 October 1950	4 years, 242 days	
5		Major General; Richard Allerup (1890–?)	1 October 1950	1 August 1951	304 days	

=== Second iteration (1952–1997) ===
No.	Portrait	Name (born–died)	Term of office			Ref.
No.	Portrait	Name (born–died)	Took office	Left office	Time in office	Ref.
1		Major General; Richard Allerup (1890–?)	1 June 1952	30 April 1955	2 years, 333 days	
2		Major General; Aksel Dahlberg (1894–?)	1 May 1955	30 September 1959	4 years, 152 days	
3		Major General; Orla Nørberg (1903–2000)	1 October 1959	31 August 1961	1 year, 334 days	
4		Major General; Jens Christian Skriver Jensen (1911–1977)	1 September 1961	30 June 1968	6 years, 303 days	
5		Major General; Aage D. Danhuus (1911–1986)	1 July 1968	28 February 1975	6 years, 242 days	
6		Major General; P. O. W. Thorsen (1917–?)	1 March 1975	30 September 1976	1 year, 213 days	
7		Major General; Hieronymus Thomassøn Havning (1925–?)	1 October 1976	31 March 1982	5 years, 181 days	
8		Major General; Holger Dencker (1923–?)	1 April 1982	30 September 1987	5 years, 182 days	
9		Major General; Wagn Andersen (1932–?)	1 October 1987	31 March 1988	182 days	
10		Major General; Søren Haslund-Christensen (1933–2021)	1 April 1988	31 August 1989	1 year, 152 days	
11		Major General; Claus Christian Ahnfeldt-Mollerup (1938–?)	1 September 1989	31 July 1990	333 days	
12		Major General; Ole Larsen Kandborg (born 1941)	1 August 1990			
13		Major General; Hans Georg Gustav Grüner (born 1944)		1991		
14		Major General; Henrik Hovard Ekmann (1943–2023)	1991	1995	3–4 years	
15		Major General; Jan Scharling (born 1946)	1995	31 December 1996	0–1 years	
Changed to Danish Division

== Names ==
Names
Jyske Division	Jutlandic Division	1932	–	1943
Jysk-fynske Kommando	Jutlandic-Funen Command	1945	–	1946
Jyske Division	Jutlandic Division	1946	–	1951
3. Division	3rd Division	1952	–	1961
Jyske Divisionskommando	Jutlandic Divisional Command	1961	–	1985
Jyske Division	Jutlandic Division	1985	–	1997
