= 10th Regiment (Denmark) =

- 10. Regiment
- Coat of arms of 10th regiment
- Active: 1 November 1951
- Disbanded: 1 September 1961
- Country: Denmark
- Branch: Royal Danish Army
- Role: Infantry
- Part of: Western Regional Command
- Garrison/HQ: Aalborg Barracks

The 10th Regiment (Danish: 10. Regiment, widely known as the Feltherrens Fodregiment) was a Danish Army infantry regiment. On 1 September 1961 it was merged with 8. Regiment and from 1 November 1961 the new regiment was known as Dronningens Livregiment. The name Feltherrens Fodregiment was never the official name, as the official name was 10. Regiment.

== History ==
The Regiment was raised during 1703 in Italy, as part of the Danish corps fighting in foreign service. On its return to Denmark it continued directly into the Great Northern War against Sweden. It further participated in the First Schleswig War (1848–1850) and the Second Schleswig War (1864). The regimental flag had the battle honour Gadebusch 1712, Fredericia 1848 and Dybbøl 1864.

It has been garrisoned in Holstein, Sønderjylland and Nørrejylland, and for a short while in Copenhagen. After the war of 1864 it was garrisoned in Aalborg, from 1938 in Viborg and from 1 January 1952 back in Aalborg.

In 1961, the newly raised 2nd Jutlandic Brigade took over the Coat of Arms from 10th regiment (Feltherrens Fodregiment)

== Names of the regiment ==
Names
1. Danske Infanteriregiment	1st Danish Infantry Regiment	10 April 1703	–	1735
Slesvigske Infanteriregiment	Schleswig Infantry Regiment	1735	–	1785
Riberske Infanteriregiment	Ribe Infantry Regiment	1785	–	1790
2. Jyske Infanteriregiment	2nd Jutland Infantry Regiment	1790	–	1842
9. Linieinfanteribataljon	9th Line Infantry Battalion	1842	–	1860
9. Infanteribataljon	9th Infantry Battalion	1860	–	1863
9. Infanteriregiment	9th Infantry Regiment	1863	–	1865
9. Infanteribataljon	9th Infantry Battalion	1865	–	1867
9. Bataljon	9th Battalion	1867	–	1951
10. Regiment	10th Regiment	1 November 1951	–	1961

== Standards ==
Historical standards of the regiment

Ribe Infantry Regiment
(1785–1790)

2nd Jutlandic Infantry Regiment
(1790–1842)

9th Battalion
(1912–1947)
