= Jutland Dragoon Regiment =

- Jydske Dragonregiment
- Coat of arms
- Active: 1 November 1679–present (347 years)
- Country: Denmark
- Branch: Royal Danish Army
- Type: Armor
- Role: Armoured warfare and Mechanized infantry
- Size: Three battalions
- Part of: Army Staff
- Garrison/HQ: Holstebro
- Nickname: JDR Dino'er
- Mottos: Latin: Fortes Fortuna Juvat (Fortune Favours the Brave)
- March: Danmarks Blå Dragoner (Denmark's Blue Dragoons)
- Anniversaries: Formation (1 November 1679); The Rytterfægtning by Rosengarten (12 Oktober 1813); Battle of Rahlstedt (6 December 1813); Battle of Sehested (10 December 1813); Niels Kjeldsen's Battle by Højen (28 February 1864); Rytterfægtningen at Vorbasse (29 February 1864)
- Engagements: Second Nordic War (1657−60); Scanian War (1675−79); Great Nordic War (1700 & 1709−20); First Schleswig War (1848−51); Second Schleswig War (1864); Operation Weserübung-Süd (1940); Operation Bøllebank (1994); War in Kosovo (1998−1999); War in Afghanistan (2001–2021); Iraq War (2003−07)
- Website: Official website

Commanders
- Current commander: Colonel Anders Poulsen
- Ceremonial chief: HM The King
- Notable commanders: Col. Lars Møller

Insignia
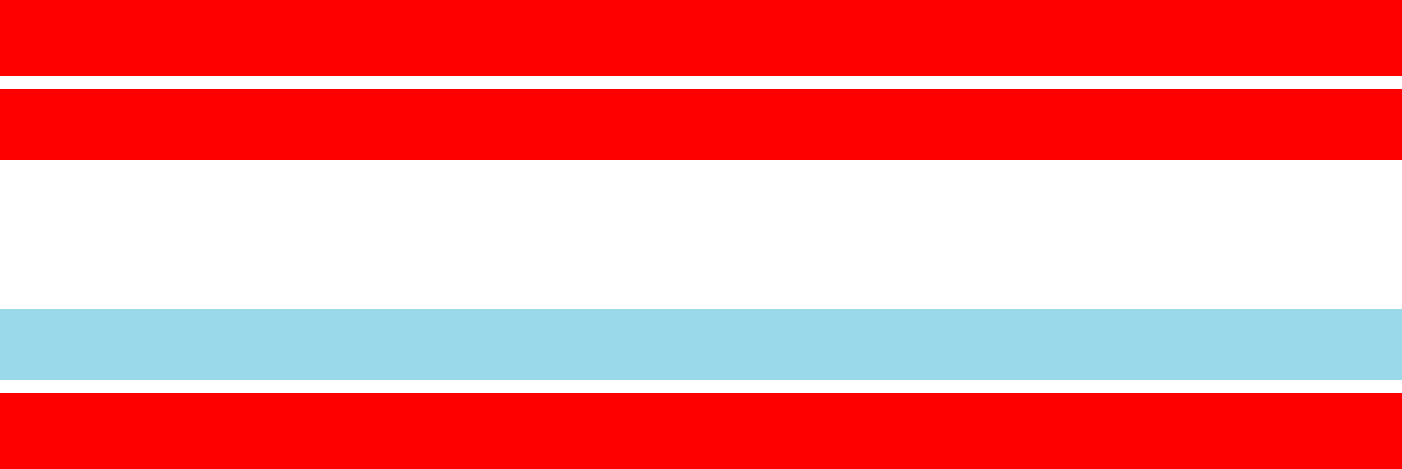
- Regimental belt

- Standard

The Jutland Dragoon Regiment (Danish: Jydske Dragonregiment) is the only regiment of the Royal Danish Army that has an armored (MBT) battalion, and is one of the Danish combat regiments in which soldiers are entitled to wear the black beret of the Armoured corps.

== History ==
The Regiment traces its roots back to the 3rd Dragoon Regiment formed in 1657, but did not become the Jutland Dragoon Regiment until 1932, with the amalgamation of the 3rd Dragoon Regiment in Århus and the 5th Dragoon regiment in Randers. The regimental fusion eventually necessitated a relocation to Holstebro in 1953, where the Dragoons have remained ever since.

The Regiment acquired international fame in recent time, when it served with UNPROFOR in Bosnia, where the Dragoons of Jutland assaulted Serb AT-3 Sagger positions in one of the largest skirmishes between UNPROFOR forces and military units involved in the war in Bosnia, and the largest Danish battle engagement since The Second Schleswig War of 1864. The battle, known as Operation Bøllebank, was later characterized by the commander at the time as the time when "the mouse ate the cat".

On 19 July 2005 another traditional regiment, Prinsens Livregiment was merged with Jydske Dragonregiment, and personnel serving as Dragoons became entitled to bear the insignia of the Royal Danish Prince Consort, Henrik, Prince Consort of Denmark

From the 1960s to 2004 the regiment had responsibility for three armoured battalions, one reconnaissance battalion and three motorized infantry battalions. The three armoured battalions were assigned to different brigades, the recce battalion and later (1992) one armoured battalion as independent battalions in Danish Division. From 1992−2004 the regiment also had to form three light reconnaissance squadrons assigned to three of the five brigades. With the three infantry battalions and regimental staff, in war time, the regiment could form a battlegroup, with combat support/artillery troops from other regiments.

The regiment has in recent time served on the frontline in Danish involvements in Yugoslavia, Kosovo, Afghanistan and Iraq.

The regiment's tank battalion won the Top 120mm Fire Team category at the Ex Worthington 16 competition in 2016, held at CFB Gagetown in Canada.

The Regimental logo is inspired by the coat of arms of Denmark, and features a blue lion above nine red hearts, and the monogram C5, in reference to King Christian V who ordered the formation of the original 3rd Dragoon Regiment. The lion and its red hearts are also a symbol of Jutland and are featured on the stern of Fregatten Jylland.

== Structure ==
The regiment today serves only in its armoured role as well as in an educational role for new conscripts, in a separate battalion.

Battalions

- I Armoured Battalion I/JDR (1953−present)
  - Staff Squadron (inactive)
  - 1st Tank Squadron (Niels Kjeldsen Squadron)
  - 2nd Tank Squadron
  - 3rd Tank Squadron (Lilje Squadron)
- II Armored Infantry Battalion II/JDR (2011−present). Motor Battalion (1953−1955), Armoured Battalion (1955–2004), Training Battalion (2004−2011)
  - Staff Company
  - 1st Mechanised Infantry Company (Viking Company)
  - 2nd Mechanised Infantry Company (Livkompagniet)
  - 4th Armored Infantry Company (4 of Diamonds Company)
- V Infantry Battalion V/JDR (2011−present). Reconnaissance Battalion (1974−2004), disbanded (2005-2011).
  - 1st Basic Training Squadron
  - 2nd Basic Training Squadron
  - 3rd Mechanised Infantry Company ("Bulldog" Squadron)

Disbanded Battalions

- III/JDR Armoured Battalion (1961−1984, 1988-2005), Armoured Infantry Battalion (1984-1987)
- IV/JDR Reconnaissance Battalion (1961−1968). Infantry Battalion (1968-2005), also as Training Battalion in mid '80s
- VI/JDR Tank Destroyer Battalion (1986-1994). Infantry Battalion (2000-2005), merged in from Queen's Life Regiment, only as reserve
- VII/JDR Infantry Battalion (1992−2005), merged in from King's Jutlandic Regiment of Foot, only as reserve
- Prince's Music Corps, (2005-2020), originally from Prince's Life Regiment

== Names of the regiment ==
Names
Slesvigske nationale Rytterregiment	Schleswig's National Cavalry Regiment	1670	–	1675
Holstenske (Slesvigsk-holstenske) nationale Rytterregiment	Holstein's (Schleswig-Holstein) National Cavalry Regiment	1675	–	1678
Slesvigske nationale Rytterregiment	Schleswig's National Cavalry Regiment	1678	–	1681
2. Fyenske nationale Rytterregiment	Funen's 2nd National Cavalry Regiment	1681	–	1763
Fyenske geworbne Dragonregiment	Funen's Recruited Dragoon Regiment	1763	–	1772
Fyenske Regiment Ryttere	Funen's Regiment of Riders	1772	–	1785
Fyenske Regiment Dragoner	Funen's Regiment of Dragoons	1785	–	1796
Fyneske regiment lette Dragoner	Funen's Regiment of Light Dragoons	1796	–	1842
6. Dragonregiment	6th Dragoon Regiment	1842	–	1865
3. Dragonregiment	3rd Dragoon Regiment	1865	–	1932
Jydske Dragonregiment	Jutland Dragoon Regiment	1932	–	present

== See also ==
- Guard Hussar Regiment
- Royal Life Guards
- Schleswig Regiment of Foot
