= King's Regiment of Foot (Denmark) =

- Kongens Fodregiment
- Coat of arms (1951-1961)
- Active: 1657–1961
- Country: Denmark
- Branch: Royal Danish Army
- Role: Infantry
- Part of: Western Regional Command
- Garrison/HQ: Tønder Barracks
- Nickname(s): The Black Regiment
- Motto(s): Vindt Qui Patitur (Whoever endures wins)

The King's Regiment of Foot (Danish: Kongens Fodregiment) was a Royal Danish Army infantry regiment. On 1 November 1961, it was amalgamated with the Jutlandic Regiment of Foot, to create the King's Jutlandic Regiment of Foot.

== History ==
From its creation, the regiment has been one of the most used in the Danish army.

It participated with bravery in the 1670s during the Skåne War. In the years before and after 1700 it was in foreign service. It fought in the Great Northern War and participated in Copenhagen's Defense Forces of 1807, and was part of all important battles in the Three Years' War (Bow, Schleswig, Dybbøl 1848), Fredericia 1849 and Isted 1850.

It fought at Dybbøl during the entire siege of 1864. On 18 of April the regiment stood on the left flank, where it took enormous losses as it sought to intercept the German attack of which had just its center of attack, where the regiment stood.

The Footmen's Pioneer command participated with honors in the battles against the German invasion forces 9 of April 1940 was merged in 1951 with King's Regiment of Foot.

== Names of the regiment ==
Names
Danish name	English name	Dates		
Lübbes Regiment	Lübbe's Regiment	1657	–	1662
Rüses Regiment	Rüse's Regiment	1662	–	1673
Weyhers Infanteriregiment	Weyher's Infantry Regiment	1673	–	1676
Prins Frederiks Regiment	Prince Frederick's Regiment	1676	–	1699
Prins Christians Regiment	Prince Christian's Regiment	1699	–	1747
Kronprinsens Regiment	The Crown Prince's Regiment	1747	–	1748
Kongens livregiment	The King's Life regiment	1748	–	1764
Norske livregiment	Norwegian Life regiment	1764	–	1819
2. Livregiment til fods	2nd Life regiment on Foot	1819	–	1842
2. Linie Infanteribataillon	2nd Line Infantry Battalion	1842	–	1848
2. Lette Infanteribataillon	2nd Light Infantry Battalion	1848	–	1855
2. Linie Infanteribataillon	2nd Line Infantry Battalion	1855	–	1860
2. Infanteribataillon	2nd Infantry Battalion	1860	–	1863
2. Infanteriregiment	2nd Infantry Regiment	1863	–	1865
2. Infanteribataillon	2nd Infantry Battalion	1865	–	1867
2. Bataillon	2nd Battalion	1867	–	1951
9. Regiment (Kongens Fodregiment)	9th Regiment (King's Regiment of Foot)	1951	–	1961
Kongens Fodregiment	King's Regiment of Foot	1961	–	1961-11-01

== Standards ==
Historical standards of the regiment

The King's Life Regiment
(?–1785)

Norwegian Life Regiment
(1785–1819)

2nd Life Regiment on Foot
(1819–1842)

2nd Battalion
(1912–1947)
