= 2nd Dragoon Regiment (Denmark) =

The 2nd Dragoon Regiment (Danish: 2. Dragonregiment) was a dragoon regiment of the Royal Danish Army, active from 1683 to 1910.

== History ==
The regiment was established in 1683 as Løvendahls Dragoneskadron and finally disbanded 20 June 1910 in Odense as 2. Dragonregiment.

A part of Holstenske Lansenerregiment was amalgamated with the regiment on 1 July 1842.

== Names of the regiment ==
Names
Løvendahls Dragoneskadron	Løvendahl's Dragoon Squadron	1683-12-27	–	1684
Løvendahls Dragonregiment	Løvendahl's Dragoon Regiment	1684	–	1693
Livregiment Dragoner	Life Regiment Dragoons	1693	–	1772
Norske Livregiment Rytteri	Norwegian Life Cavalry Regiment	1772	–	1785
Livregiment Dragoner	Life Regiment Dragoons	1785	–	1791
Livregiment lette Dragoner	Life Regiment Light Dragoons	1791	–	1842
2. Dragonregiment	2nd Dragoon Regiment	1842	–	1848-03-24
Disbanded	Disbanded	1848-03-24	–	1851
Holstenske Dragonregiment	Holstein Dragoon Regiment	1851	–	1852
2. Dragonregiment	2nd Dragoon Regiment	1852	–	1865-03-24
Disbanded	Disbanded	1865-03-24	–	1867-09-30
2. Dragonregiment	2nd Dragoon Regiment	1867	–	1910-06-20
