= Jutland Regiment of Foot =

Jutlandic Regiment of Foot
- Jyske Fodregiment
- Active: 1675 – 1961
- Country: Denmark
- Branch: Royal Danish Army
- Role: Infantry
- Part of: Western Regional Command
- Garrison/HQ: Bülow's Barracks
- Motto: Pro Pace Armatus (Armed for Peace)

The Jutlandic Regiment of Foot (Danish: Jyske Fodregiment) was a Royal Danish Army infantry regiment. On 1 November 1961, it was amalgamated with the King's Regiment of Foot, to create the King's Jutlandic Regiment of Foot.

== History ==
The Jutlandic Regiment of Foot could trace its history back to 1675. The Regiment participated in the Scanian War (1675–1679), Nine Years' War (1693), Great Northern War (1700), Great Northern War (1709–1720), Slaget på Reden (1801), First Schleswig War (1848–1850) and Second Schleswig War (1864).

In 1961, the newly started 1st Jutlandic Brigade took over the coat of arms and some of the history from Jutlandic Regiment of Foot.

== Names of the regiment ==
Names
Nye Sydjydske Regiment	New South Jutlandic Regiment	1675	–	1679
Jyske Wedelske Regiment til Fods	Jutlandic Wedelian Regiment on Foot	1679	–	1684
Jyske Wedelske Infanteriregiment	Jutlandic Wedelian Infantry Regiment	1679	–	1684
Jyske nationale Regiment	Jutlandic National Regiment	1684	–	1702
Jyske Nationale Regiment under Feltmarskallen Baron Wedell	Jutlandic National Regiment under Field marshal Baron Wedell	1684	–	1693
Jyske Wedellske Nationale Regiment	Jutlandic Wedelian National Regiment	1693	–	1702
Jyske Infanteriregiment	Jutlandic Infantry Regiment	1702	–	1715
Jyske Regiment	Jutlandic Regiment	1702	–	1715
Jyske geworbne Regiment	Jutlandic Recruited Regiment	1715	–	1780
Jyske Regiment til Fods	Jutlandic Regiment on Foot	1780	–	1781
Jyske Infanteriregiment	Jutlandic Infantry Regiment	1781	–	1790
Fyenske Infanteriregiment	Funen Infantry Regiment	1790	–	1842
12. Linie Infanteribataillon	12th Line Infantry Battalion	1842	–	1848
12. Lette Infanteribataillon	12th Light Infantry Battalion	1848	–	1855
12. Linie Infanteribataillon	12th Line Infantry Battalion	1855	–	1860
12. Infanteribataillon	12th Infantry Battalion	1860	–	1863
12. Infanteriregiment	12th Infantry Regiment	1863	–	1865
12. Infanteribataillon	12th Infantry Battalion	1865	–	1867
12. Bataillon	12th Battalion	1867	–	1951
7. Regiment (Jyske Fodregiment)	7th Regiment (Jutlandic Regiment of Foot)	1951	–	1961
Jyske Fodregiment	Jutlandic Regiment of Foot	1961	–	1961-11-01

== Standards ==
Historical standards of the regiment

Jutlandic Infantry Regiment
(1785–1790)

Funen Infantry Regiment
(1790–1842)

12th Battalion
(1912–1947)
