= Engineer Regiment (Denmark) =

- Ingeniørregimentet
- Coat of arms of the Engineer Regiment
- Active: 6 November 1684 (Historic); 1997–present
- Country: Kingdom of Denmark
- Branch: Royal Danish Army
- Part of: Army Staff
- Garrison/HQ: Skive Kaserne, Skive
- Mottos: Contendere Atque Auxiliar (Let's strive to help each other)
- Website: Official website

Commanders
- Current commander: Colonel René Nyborg Sindberg-Sørensen
- Ceremonial chief: HM The King

Insignia
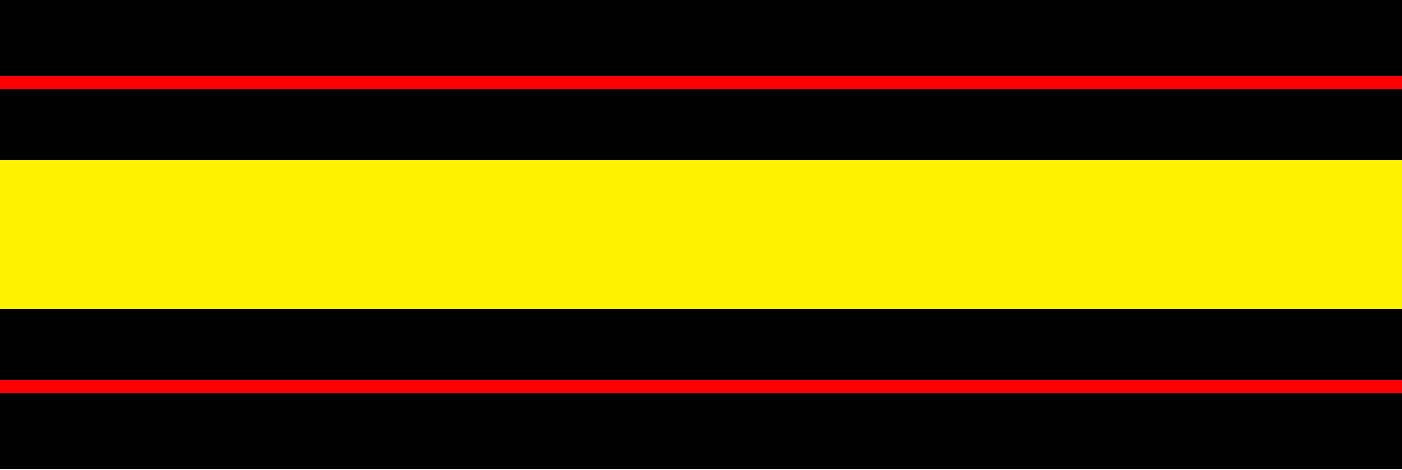
- Regimental belt

- Colours

The Engineer Regiment (Danish: Ingeniørregimentet) is a regiment in the Royal Danish Army with base in Skive in Jutland. The soldiers of this regiment are trained in skills such as demolition, bomb disposal, bridge construction, defending against chemical, biological and radiological hazards, and much more. The engineer troops are also trained to fight alongside infantry regiments in combat zones if needed.

This regiment was formed by the amalgamation of nearly all of the Danish military engineering corps into one regiment in 1997, simply named Ingeniørregimentet. The core of the Danish combat engineers are the so-called armored engineers. These units usually work in detached squads, each under the command of and attached to an infantry company, and equipped with an M113. Their roles are combat demolition, minefield clearing, basic mine laying and EOR. They are also extensively trained as infantry, to support the ordinary troops in combat. Besides these units, the regiment has the different work fields of combat engineers (construction, EOD, CBRN) spread out over different companies.

== Structure ==
Today the Engineer Regiment has three battalions:

- 1st Armored Engineer Battalion (1 PNIGBTN)
  - Staff Company
  - 1st Armored Engineer Company
  - 2nd Armored Engineering Company
  - 3rd Armored Engineering Company
- 2nd Explosive Ordnance Disposal Battalion (2 EODBTN)
  - 5th EOD Company (5 EODKMP)
  - 6th Army Basic Training Company
  - 7th Army Basic Training Company
  - Engineer Training Company
- 3rd CBRN & Construction Battalion (3 CBRN & KONSTBTN)
  - 3rd Construction Company (3 KONSTKMP)
  - 4th CBRN & Geospatial Company (4 CBRN-&GEOKMP)

== See also ==
- Royal Danish Army
