= Logistic Regiment (Denmark) =

- Trænregimentet
- Coat of arms
- Active: 1865–present (10 May 1990, in its current form)
- Country: Denmark
- Branch: Royal Danish Army
- Type: Support
- Role: Logistics: Training (One battalion); Logistics (One battalion); Military police (One battalion); Medical (One battalion); Maintenance (One battalion)
- Size: Five battalions
- Part of: Army Staff
- Garrison/HQ: Aalborg Barracks
- Motto: Sustaining Victory
- March: Trænregimentets March
- Website: Official website

Commanders
- Current commander: Colonel Michael Elsøe Frandsen
- Ceremonial chief: HM The King

Insignia
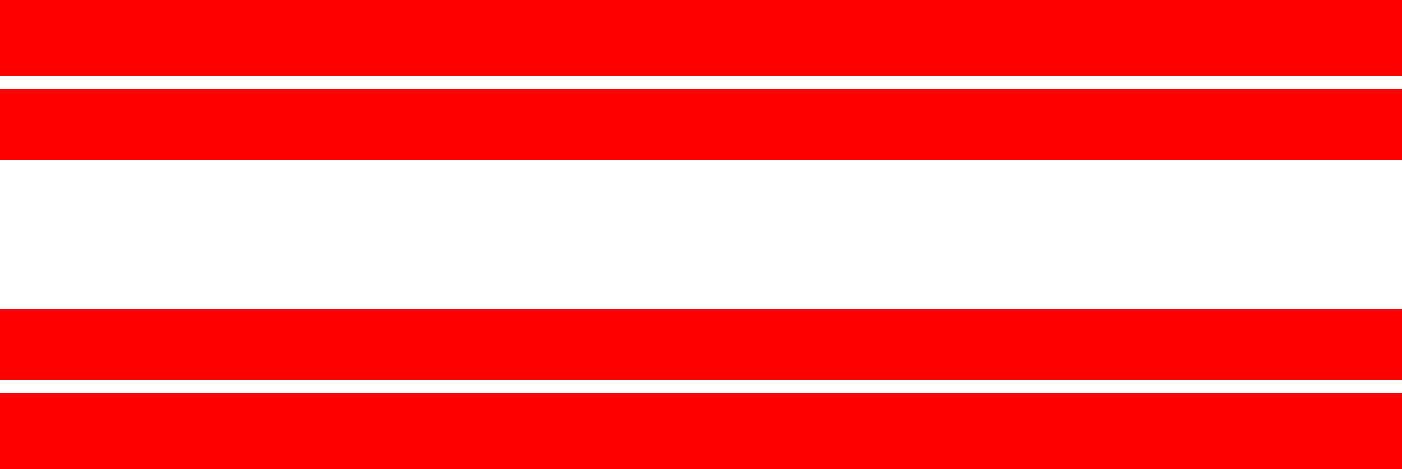
- Regimental belt

- Colours

The Logistic Regiment (Danish: Trænregimentet) is the military logistics regiment of the Royal Danish Army, responsible for army supply and emergency medical personnel. It is based in Aalborg.

== History ==
Regimental origins can be traced back to 1865 when the first logistic companies were established in the Royal Artillery. It was not until 1880 that there was established a separate exercise department, which still was subject to artillery.

In 2015, the Danish Military Police was amalgamated with the Logistic Regiment.

== Structure ==
Today the Regiment consists of three logistics battalions, the Military police, and the Defense Traffic Center:

- Staff
- 1st Logistical Battalion
  - Staff Platoon
  - 1st Supply Company
  - 2nd Medical Company
  - 3rd Maintenance Company
  - 4th Transport Company
- 2nd Logistical Battalion
  - 1st Training Company
  - 2nd Training Company
  - 3rd Logistic Training Company
- 3rd Brigade Support Battalion
  - HQ Company
  - Company
  - Company
  - Company
  - Company
- 4th National Support Battalion (Vordingborg Barraks)
  - 1st National Support Element
  - 2nd National Support Element
  - 3rd National Support Element
  - 4th National Support Element
  - 5th National Support Element (Training)
- Military police
  - 1st MP Company
  - 2nd MP Company
  - MP Company — assigned to 1st Brigade
  - MP School
  - MP Station Copenhagen
  - MP Station Ålborg
- Defense Traffic Center
  - Traffic Section
  - Defense Vehicle Inspection
  - Defense Driving School

Disbandet units

- 3rd Maintenance Battalion (inactive)
  - Staff
  - 1st Company
  - 2nd Company
