= Marine Regiment (Denmark) =

- Marineregimentet
- Active: 1672 – 1814 under Denmark–Norway; 1814 – 2000 under Denmark
- Disbanded: 3 June 2000
- Country: Denmark–Norway; Denmark
- Branch: Royal Dano-Norwegian Navy; Royal Danish Army
- Type: Marines
- Size: Regiment
- Garrison/HQ: Almegård barracks
- Mottos: Nec timide, nec temere (Neither timidly nor rashly)
- Battle honours: Torsebro 1710; Gadebusch 1712; Fredericia 1849; Frederikstad 1850; Dybbøl 1864

The Marine Regiment (Danish: Marineregimentet) was the naval infantry regiment of the Royal Dano-Norwegian Navy, and later an infantry marines regiment, established in 1672 by Christian IV and based at Glückstadt Naval Station.

== History ==
The Marine Regiment was a Danish-Norwegian unit, which was established in 1672 with Captain Vogel as commanding officer and its garrison at Naval Station Glückstadt in the town of Glückstadt at the Elbe in Holstein. Before the regiment was raised, Danish warships always had a group of regular soldiers on board, whose job it was to fire on decks, rigging and the hallway of enemy ships and capture them. However, having Army and Navy troops on the same ship created command and organisational problems, as ships had two commanders, one commanding the ship and responsible for maneuvering and navigation and one commanding the soldiers. Raising the Marine Regiment under Navy command removed these problems.

It was considered a punishment to be a mariners (Marines), and the recruitment base for the regiment included individuals who could not adapt to other regiments. This created a tradition of extremely hardy soldiers. Even among sailors these soldiers were feared and hated. But one thing you could not deprive them was their fighting spirit and courage. The unit fought honourably in many battles, regardless of the Danish efforts in general.

In several battles the Regiment received permission to leave the battlefield with weapons in hand as recognition for their efforts.

In 1741, it moved to Rendsburg and changed its name to Bornholm Infantry Marines Regiment (Danish: Bornholmske infanteriregiment).

== Units ==
From 1951 the battalions of the Marine Regiment was under the command of Bornholms Defence.

- 1st (I/BV) Motorized Infantry Battalion (1951-2000).
- 2nd (II/BV) Motorized Infantry Battalion (1951-2000).
- 3rd (III/BV) Infantry Marines Battalion (1986-1996).

== Names of the regiment ==
Names
Vogels Marinekompagni	Vogel's Marine Company	1672	–	1680
Marineregimentet	Marine Regiment	1680	–	1741
Bornholmske Infanteriregiment	Bornholm Infantry Regiment	1741	–	1785
Århusiske Infanteriregiment	Århus Infantry Regiment	1785	–	1790
1. Jyske Infanteriregiment	1st Jutlandic Infantry Regiment	1790	–	1842
7. Linie Infanteri-Bataillon	7th Line Infantry Battalion	1842	–	1860
7. Infanteri-Bataillon	7th Infantry Battalion	1860	–	1863
7. Infanteri-Regiment	7th Infantry Regiment	1863	–	1865
7. Infanteri-Bataillon	7th Infantry Battalion	1865	–	1867
7. Bataillon	7th Battalion	1867	–	1951-11-01
Marineregimentet	Marine Regiment	1951-11-01	–	2000-06-30

== Standards ==
Historical standards of the regiment

Bornholm Infantry Regiment
(?–1785)

Aarhus Infantry Regiment
(1785–1790)

1st Jutlandic Infantry Regiment
(1790–1860)

7th Battalion
(1912–1947)
