= King's Jutland Regiment of Foot =

King's Jutlandic Regiment of Foot
- Kongens Jyske Fodregiment
- Coat of arms
- Active: 1961-1991
- Country: Denmark
- Branch: Royal Danish Army
- Role: Infantry
- Garrison/HQ: Fredericia Barracks
- Nickname: The Black Regiment
- Motto: Vindt Qui Patitur (Whoever endures wins).
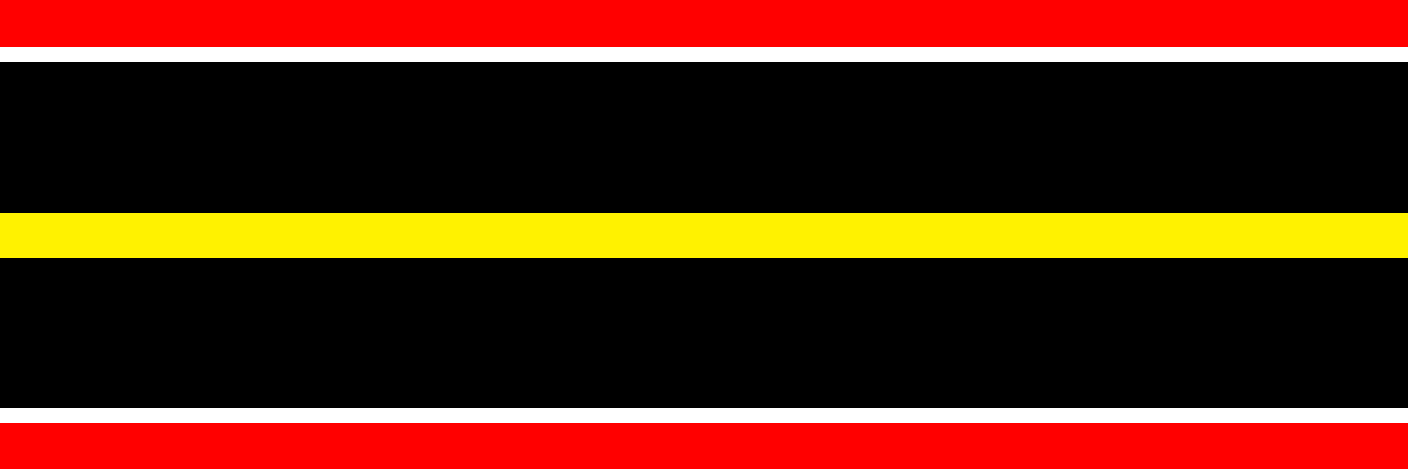
- Regimental belt

The King's Jutlandic Regiment of Foot (Danish: Kongens Jyske Fodregiment) was a Royal Danish Army infantry regiment. On 1 November 1991, it was merged with the Funen Life Regiment, into Schleswig Regiment of Foot.

== History ==
The King's Jutlandic Regiment of Foot was formed in 1961 by merging the Jutlandic Regiment of Foot and King's Regiment of Foot

== Organisation ==
- 1st battalion (I/KJFR), Founded 1961, disbanded 1990. Mechanized Infantry Battalion
  - Staff Company
  - 1st Armored Infantry Company
  - 2nd Armored Infantry Company
  - 3rd Tank Squadron (along with from 1981 to 1988)
  - 4th Motorised Infantry Company
- 2nd battalion (II/KJFR), Founded 1961, disbanded 1990. Infantry Battalion.
  - Staff Company
  - 1st Motorised Infantry Company
  - 2nd Motorised Infantry Company
  - 3rd Motorised Infantry Company (same shield with color Blue/White at the top bar)
- 3rd battalion (III/KJFR), Founded 1961, disbanded 1990. Infantry Battalion.
  - Staff Company
  - 1st Motorised Infantry Company
  - 2nd Motorised Infantry Company
  - 3rd Motorised Infantry Company
- 1st Brigade Staff Company/1st Jutland Brigade, Founded 1961, Transferred to Signal Regiment in 1991.

== Names of the regiment ==
Names
2. Bataillon	2nd Battalion	12. Bataillon	12th Battalion	1857	–	1951
9. Regiment (Kongens Fodregiment)	9th Regiment (King's Regiment of Foot)	7. Regiment (Jyske Fodregiment)	7th Regiment (Jutlandic Regiment of Foot)	1951	–	1961
Kongens Fodregiment	King's Regiment of Foot	Jyske Fodregiment	Jutlandic Regiment of Foot	1961	–	1961
	amalgamation	01-11-1961
	Kongens Jyske Fodregiment	King's Jutlandic Regiment of Foot		1961	–	1991
