= Queen's Life Regiment =

- Dronningens Livregiment
- Coat of arms
- Active: 1657 – 2000
- Country: Denmark
- Branch: Royal Danish Army
- Type: Mechanized infantry
- Size: Regiment
- Garrison/HQ: Ålborg Barracks
- Motto(s): Stærk for retfærdighed.
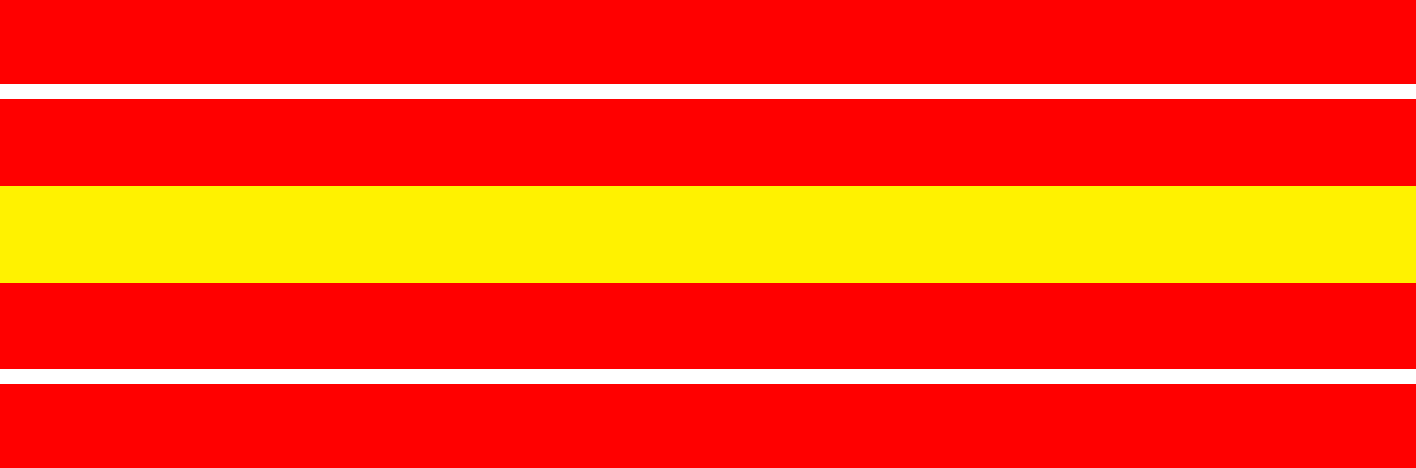
- Stable belt

The Queen's Life Regiment (Danish: Dronningens Livregiment) was a mechanized infantry regiment. On 1 January 2001, it was amalgamated with the Prince's Life Regiment.

== History ==
After the siege and storming of Copenhagen, on 16 October 1659, King Frederick III honored the regiment with the name "Queen's Life Regiment" for the regiment's courage.

The regiment was in foreign war service (mostly British) around 1700. It participated in the Great Nordic War and in the 1864 campaign, when it participated with particular energy and contempt for death in the defense of Dybøl on 18 April 1864. It was almost wiped out.

On 1 November 1961 the Field Lord's Regiment of Foot was merged into the Queen's Life Regiment.

On October 25, 1994 a tank platoon from the regiment's 3rd Tank Squadron/1st Battalion conducted Operation Amanda as part of UNPROFOR.

== Structure ==
- 1st battalion (I/DRLR), raised in 1961 and disbanded in 2000. Mechanized Infantry Battalion.
  - Saff Company (Oldenborske)
  - 1st Armored Infantry Company (Livkompagniet)
  - 2nd Armored Infantry Company (Hans Schack)
  - 3rd Tank Squadron (Blyw wé)
  - 4th Motorised Infantry Company (Bernstorff)
- 2nd battalion (II/DRLR), raised in 1961 and disbanded in 2000. Mechanized Infantry Battalion from 1979.
  - Saff Company
  - 1st Armored Infantry Company
  - 2nd Armored Infantry Company
  - 3rd Tank Squadron
  - 4th Motorised Infantry Company
- 3rd battalion (III/DRLR), raised in 1961 and disbanded in 2000. Mechanized Infantry Battalion 1991–1996.
  - Saff Company
  - 1st Infantry Company
  - 2nd Infantry Company
  - 3rd Infantry Company
- 4th battalion (IV/DRLR), raised in 1961 and disbanded in 2000. Mechanized Infantry Battalion 1991–1996.
  - Saff Company
  - 1st Infantry Company
  - 2nd Infantry Company
  - 3rd Infantry Company
- 5th battalion (V/DRLR), raised in 1990 and disbanded in 1996.
  - Saff Company
  - 1st Infantry Company
  - 2nd Infantry Company
  - 3rd Infantry Company
- 6th battalion (VI/DRLR), raised in 1990 and disbanded in 1996.
  - Saff Company
  - 1st Infantry Company
  - 2nd Infantry Company
  - 3rd Infantry Company
- 2nd Staff Company/2nd Jutland Brigade. (1961-1976), transferred to Nørre jyske Artilleriregiment
- Tank destroyer Squadron/1st Territorial Region (1979-1983)
- LRRP Company. (1983-2000) Part of Jutland Division, from 1997 Danish Division

== Names of the regiment ==
Names
Ulrik Christian Gyldenløves Regiment Dragoner	Ulrik Christian Gyldenløve's Regiment Dragoons	1657	–	1658
Holcks Regiment Dragoner	Holck's Regiment Dragoons	1658	–	1659
Dronningens Livregiment (Dragoner)	Queen's Life Regiment (Dragoons)	1659	–	1842
17. Linie Infanteribataillon	17th Line Infantry Battalion	1842	–	1848
Disbanded	Disbanded	1848	–	1851
3. Holstenske Infanteribataillon	Prince Frederik's Regiment	1851	–	1852
17. Linie Infanteribataillon	17th Line Infantry Battalion	1852	–	1860
17. Infanteribataillon	17th Infantry Battalion	1860	–	1863
17. Infanteriregiment	17th Infantry Regiment	1863	–	1865
17. Infanteribataillon	17th Infantry Battalion	1865	–	1867
17. Bataillon	17th Battalion	1867	–	1951
8. Regiment (Dronningens Livregiment)	8th Regiment (Queen's Life Regiment)	1951	–	1961
Dronningens Livregiment	Queen's Life Regiment	1961	–	2000

== Standards ==
Historical standards of the regiment

Queen's Life Regiment
(?–1790)

Queen's Life Regiment
(1810–1842)

17th Battalion
(1912–1947)
