= Prince's Life Regiment =

- Prinsens Livregiment
- Active: 1961–2005
- Disbanded: August 2005
- Country: Denmark
- Branch: Royal Danish Army
- Role: Mechanized infantry
- Size: four to five battalions (1961-1999); Seven battalions (2000-2005)
- Garrison/HQ: Viborg Kaserne 1961-2000; Skive Kaserne 2000-2005
- Motto(s): Gloria Finis (Glory to the End)
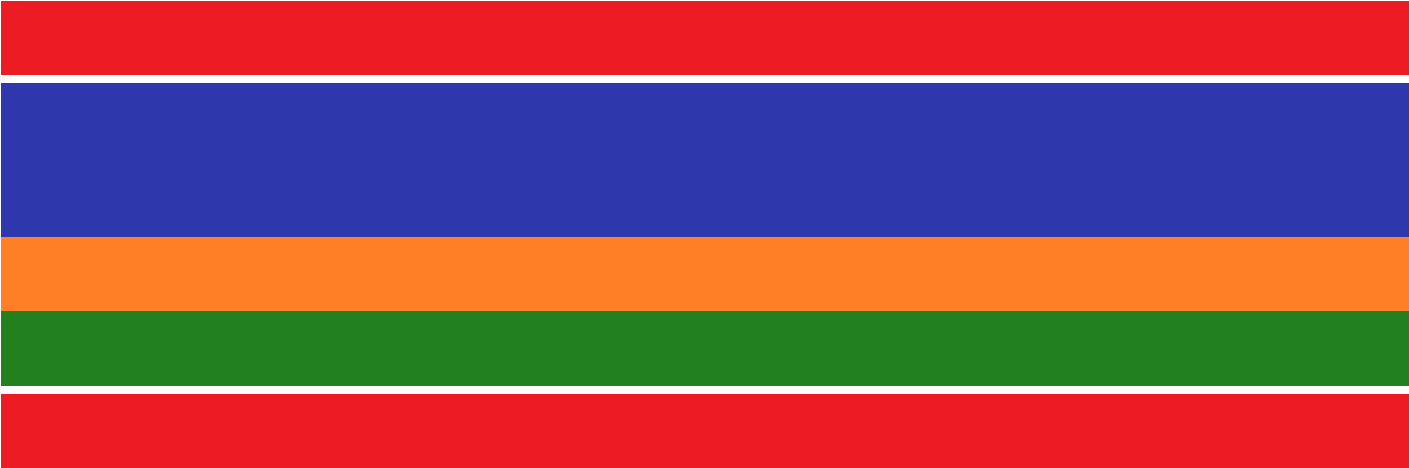
- Regimental belt

The Prince's Life Regiment (Danish: Prinsens Livregiment) was a Royal Danish Army infantry regiment. The motto of the regiment was "Gloria Finis" (Glory to the End).

== History ==
Because one of the regiment's antecedents was the life regiment of Queen Ingrid, the Queen Mother, the regiment had both Prince Henrik's and the then late Queen Mother's cyphers on its Regimental Colour. The regiment was raised during the reign of King Frederik III in 1657 under the command of Ernst Albrecht von Eberstein. Over the years it underwent many changes of name, the last taking place in 1961.

The Regiment participated in the Northern Wars (1657–1660), Scanian War (1675–1679), Great Northern War (1709–1720), First Schleswig War (1848–1850) and Second Schleswig War (1864). It was furthermore in foreign service during 1689–1697 and 1701–1714. The regimental flag had the battle honours Nyborg 1659, Wismar 1675, Rygen 1715, Treldeskansen 1849, Dybbøl 1849 and Dybbøl 1864.

From the 1960s to 2000 the regiment had two mechanised and two infantry battalions, from 2000 to 2004 it had four mechanised and three infantry battalions.

In 2000, two other regiments, Schleswig Regiment of Foot and Queen's Life Regiment, were merged into Prince's Life Regiment. In August 2005, the regiment was amalgamated with Jutland Dragoon Regiment.

== Organisation ==
Disband units

- 1st battalion (I/PLR), raised in 1961 and disbanded in 2004. Mechanized Infantry Battalion.
  - Staff Company
  - 1st Armored Infantry Company
  - 2nd Armored Infantry Company
  - 3rd Tank Squadron
  - 4th Motorised Infantry Company
- 2nd battalion (II/PLR), raised in 1961 and disbanded in 2004. Mechanized Infantry Battalion from 1979.
  - Staff Company
  - 1st Armored Infantry Company
  - 2nd Armored Infantry Company
  - 3rd Tank Squadron
  - 4th Motorised Infantry Company
- 3rd battalion (III/PLR), raised in 1961 and disbanded in 2004. Mechanized Infantry Battalion from 2000 to 2004.
  - Staff Company
  - 1st Armored Infantry Company
  - 2nd Armored Infantry Company
  - 3rd Tank Squadron
  - 4th Motorised Infantry Company
- 4th battalion (IV/PLR), raised in 1961 and disbanded in 2004. Infantry Battalion. Mechanized Infantry Battalion from 2000 to 2004.
  - Staff Company
  - 1st Armored Infantry Company
  - 2nd Armored Infantry Company
  - 3rd Tank Squadron
  - 4th Motorised Infantry Company
- 5th battalion (V/PLR), raised in 1961 and disbanded in 2004. Infantry Battalion. Mechanized Infantry Battalion from 2000 to 2004
  - Staff Company
  - 1st Armored Infantry Company
  - 2nd Motorised Infantry Company
  - 3rd Tank Squadron
  - 4th Motorised Infantry Company
- 6th battalion (VI/PLR), raised in 2000 and disbanded in 2004. Infantry Battalion.
  - Staff Company
  - 1st Infantry Company
  - 2nd Infantry Company
  - 3rd Infantry Company
- 7th battalion (VII/PLR), raised in 2000 and disbanded in 2004. Infantry Battalion.
  - Staff Company
  - 1st Infantry Company
  - 2nd Infantry Company
  - 3rd Infantry Company
- Tank destroyer Squadron/2nd Territorial Region (1979-1983)
- 2nd Staff Company/Rear Combat Group/Danish Division (2000-2004)
- LRRP Company. (2000-2004) Part of Danish Division
- Prince's Music Corps, (1961-2004)

== Names of the regiment ==
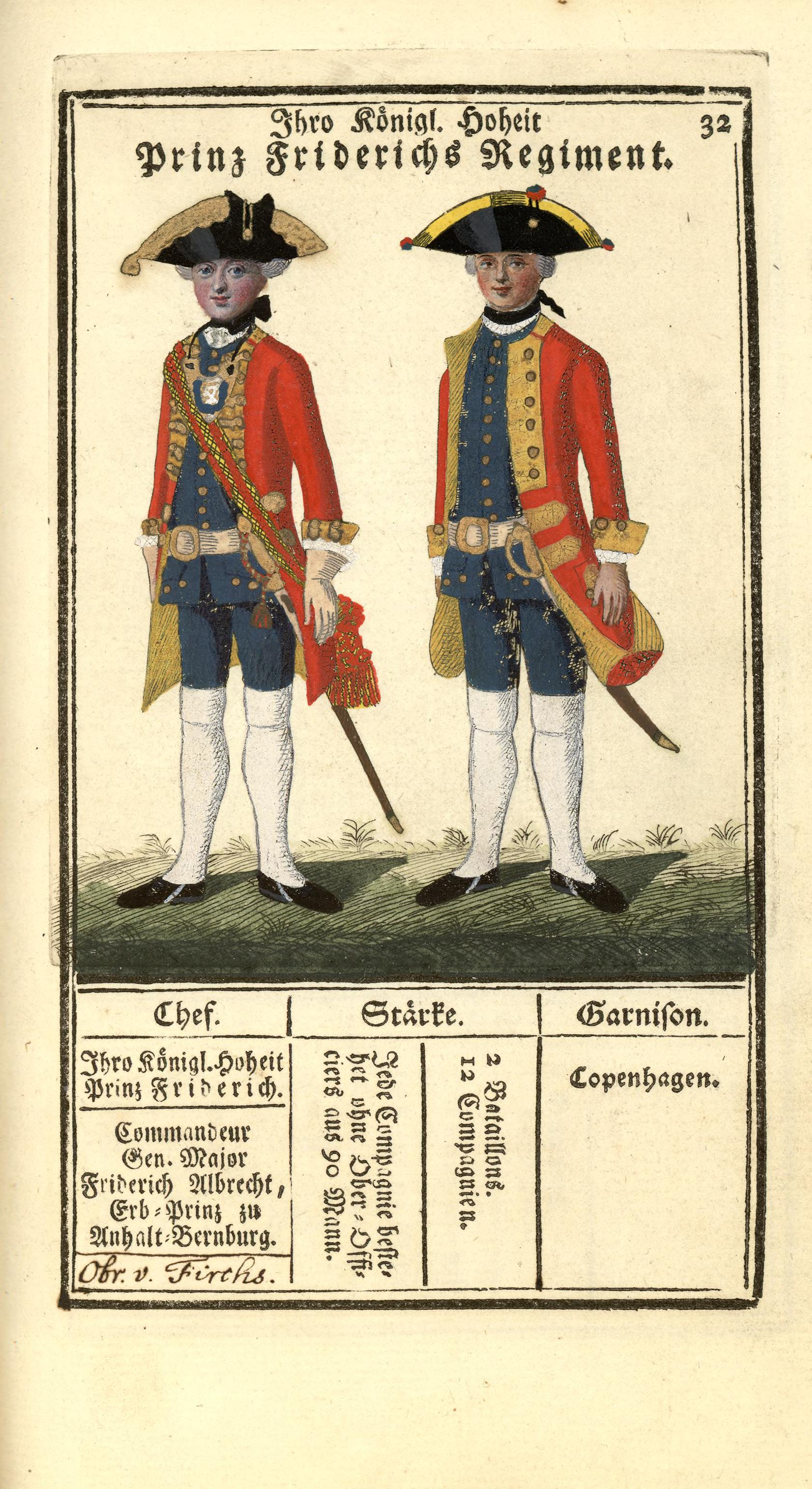
"Ihre Königl. Hoheit Prinz Friderichs Regiment" - illustration from 1763

Names
Ebersteins Regiment	Eberstein's Regiment	1657-11-30	–	1665
Bremers Regiment	Bremer's Regiment	1665	–	1672
Max Rosenkrantz Regiment	Max Rosenkrantz's Regiment	1672	–	1676
Prins Christians Regiment	Prince Christian's Regiment	1676	–	1695
Prins Carls Regiment	Prince Carl's Regiment	1695	–	1730
Schacks Regiment	Schack's Regiment	1730	–	1734
Dombroicks Regiment	Dombroick's Regiment	1734	–	1735
Laalandske (Lollandske) geworbne Infanteri-Regiment	Lolland Recruited Infantry Regiment	1735	–	1753
Prins Frederiks geworbne Infanteri-Regiment (Arveprinsen)	Prince Frederick's Recruited Infantry Regiment (Hereditary Prince)	1753	–	1806
Prins Christian Frederiks Infanteriregiment	Prince Christian Frederick's Regiment (on Foot)	1806	–	1839
Kongens Regiment til Fods	The King's Regiment on Foot	1839	–	1842
6. Linie-Infanteri-Bataillon	6th Line Infantry Battalion	1842	–	1860
6. Infanteribataljon	6th Infantry Battalion	1860	–	1863
6. Infanteriregiment	6th Infantry Regiment	1863	–	1865
6. Infanteribataljon	6th Infantry Battalion	1865	–	1867
6. Bataljon	6th Battalion	1867	–	1951-10-01
3. Regiment	3rd Regiment	1951-10-01	–	1961
Prinsens Livregiment	The Prince's Life Regiment	1961	–	2005

== Standards ==
Historical standards of the regiment

Prince Frederick's Recruited Infantry Regiment (Hereditary Prince)
(1753–1790)

Prince Frederick's Recruited Infantry Regiment (Hereditary Prince)
(1790–1808)

6th Battalion
(1912–1947)
