= Surrender of Tranquebar (1808) =

1808 capture of a European fort in India

- Part of the English Wars
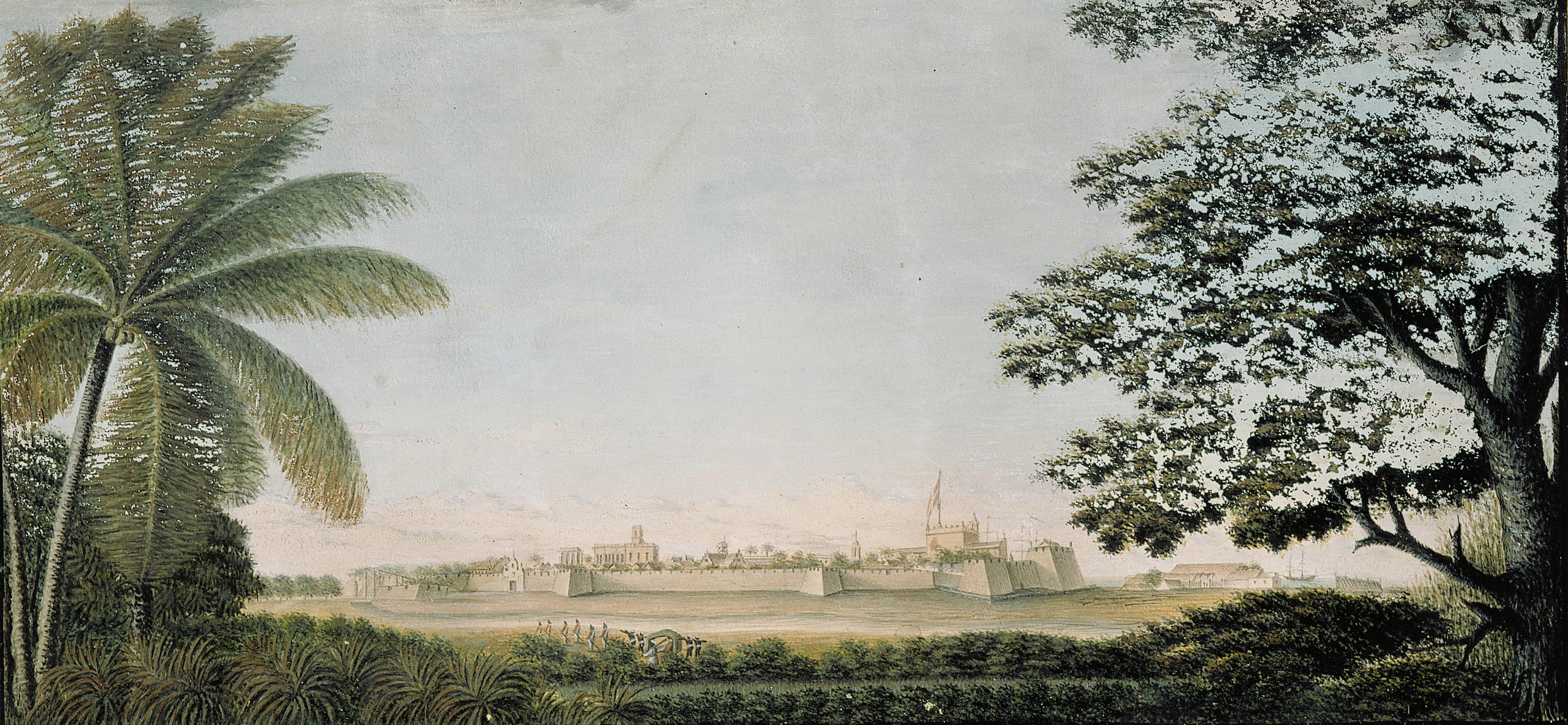
- Tranquebar, by former governor, Peter Anker
Date	12 February 1808
Location	Tranquebar, Danish India (present-day India) 11°1′45″N 79°50′58″E
Result	British victory
Territorial changes	Tranquebar occupied by the British

Belligerents
United Kingdom	Denmark-Norway

Commanders and leaders
(United Kingdom of Great Britain and Ireland) James Watson (United Kingdom of Great Britain and Ireland) Thomas Caulfield	(Denmark–Norway) Peter Hermanson (surrendered)

Units involved
(United Kingdom of Great Britain and Ireland) 14th Foot Regiment (United Kingdom of Great Britain and Ireland) EIC's artillery (United Kingdom of Great Britain and Ireland) HMS Russell (United Kingdom of Great Britain and Ireland) HMS Monmouth	(Denmark–Norway) Dansborg garrison (Denmark–Norway) HDMS Nancy (Denmark–Norway) HDMS Charlotte (Denmark–Norway) HDMS Sophia

Strength
8 merchantmen 2 ships 74 cannons	3 ships

Casualties and losses
None	None

The Surrender of Tranquebar (Danish: Overgivelsen af Trankebar) or the Capture of Tranquebar (Danish: Overtagelsen af Trankebar) was a surrender of the capital of Danish India, Tranquebar, in 1808 to the British East India Company as a result of the English Wars. The capital surrendered almost immediately after the arrival of a British force.

== Background ==
In 1801, hostilities between Denmark–Norway spread to their colonial holdings, including India. On 12 May 1801, Tranquebar, the capital of Danish India, surrendered to the British under Richard Wellesley. Similar events would happen to Serampore and the Danish West Indies, however, hostilities ended after the Treaty of Amiens, where it was decided Britain was to embark from the Danish possessions in 1802.

== Surrender ==
In early 1808, hostilities broke out again, and as a response, the British sent HMS Russell and HMS Monmouth with a detachment of the 14th Regiment of Foot and 74 cannons to Tranquebar. Upon anchoring off Tranquebar on 12 February 1808, the British recommended the Danish governor, Peter Hermanson, to surrender, which he quickly did. At 10 PM, articles of capitulation were signed, between Colonel James Watson and Captain Thomas Caulfield, on behalf of the British, and Governor Hermanson on behalf of the Danish.

== Aftermath ==
Tranquebar and the other Danish possessions in India were occupied by Britain until 1815, however, the damage to the trade never recovered, and in 1845 Denmark sold its Indian holdings to Britain for 1.125.000 Danish Rigsdaler.

== See also ==
- Battle of West Kay – 1801 battle of the English Wars
- Battle of Copenhagen (1807) – Battle of the Napoleonic Wars
- Plunder of Nancowry – 1805 engagement of the English Wars

== Works cited ==
- Glover, Gareth (30 September 2018). "10". The Two Battles of Copenhagen, 1801 and 1807: Britain and Denmark in the Napoleonic Wars. Casemate Publishers. ISBN 978-1-4738-9833-2.
- Liisberg, H. C. Bering (13 January 2020). Danmarks søfart og søhandel. Bind 1 (in Danish). Lindhardt og Ringhof. ISBN 978-87-26-30660-6.
- Larsen, Kay (1940). Guvernører, Residenter, Kommandanter og Chefer (PDF) (in Danish). Copenhagen: Arthur Jensens Forlag.
- Gold, Joyce (2014). The Naval Chronicle. Vol. 20. Joyce Gold. p. 145.
