= Capture of Serampore (1801) =

1801 capture of a Danish colony in India

- Part of the English Wars
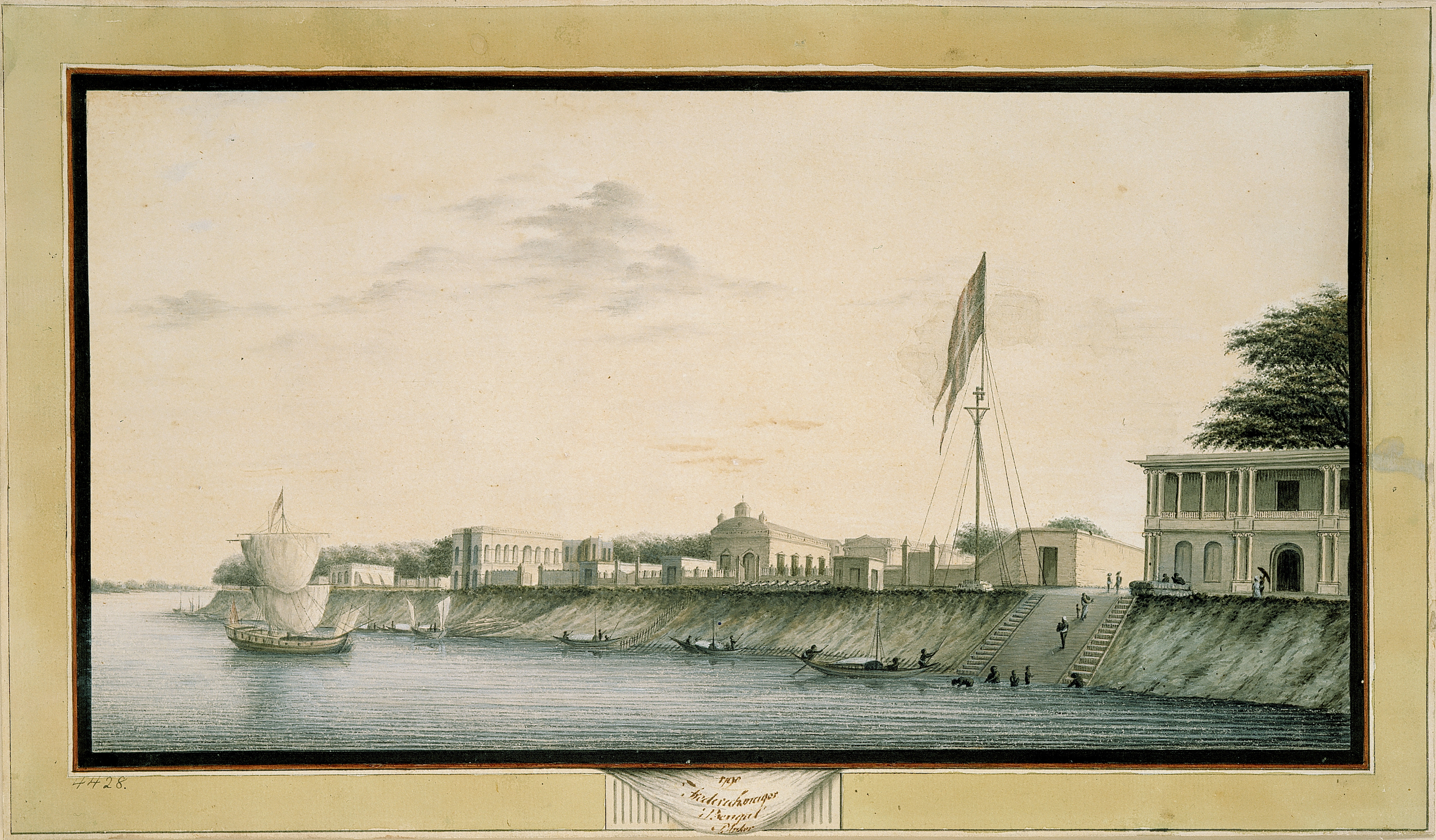
- Painting of Danish Serampore (Frederiksnagore), by Peter Anker
Date	8 May 1801
Location	Serampore, Danish India (present-day India) 22.75°N 88.34°E
Result	British victory
Territorial changes	Serampore occupied by Britain

Belligerents
United Kingdom	Denmark-Norway

Commanders and leaders
(United Kingdom of Great Britain and Ireland) Dickson (United Kingdom of Great Britain and Ireland) Shawe (United Kingdom of Great Britain and Ireland) Armstrong (United Kingdom of Great Britain and Ireland) Morris	(Denmark–Norway) Ole Bie (surrendered) (Denmark–Norway) Unknown captain

Units involved
(United Kingdom of Great Britain and Ireland) Fort William garrison (United Kingdom of Great Britain and Ireland) HMS Norway	(Denmark–Norway) Serampore garrison (Denmark–Norway) HDMS Norge (Denmark–Norway) HDMS Charlotte

Strength
Unknown	44 men 1 ship

Casualties and losses
None	1 ship

The Capture of Serampore (Danish: Overtagelsen af Serampore), alternatively the Capture of Frederiknagore (Danish: Overtagelsen af Frederiknagore), was a British capture of the Danish colony of Serampore (Frederiknagore) on 8 May 1801 during the English Wars. The British met no resistance, and could subsequently quickly capture the settlement.

== Background ==
During the French Revolutionary Wars in 1800 and early 180, rising tensions between Denmark–Norway and the United Kingdom arose and the Danish colonies in India subsequently received the intelligence of the rising tensions between the two nations. As a result, Danish merchants in Tranquebar and Serampore sold their ships in order for them not to be seized by the British, and the colonies prepared for war.

== Capture ==
On the night of 8 May, a detachment from the British Fort William garrison, under the command of Colonel Dickson, proceeded from Barrackpore to the Danish settlement of Serampore (Frederiknagore.) The Dano-Norwegian governor, Ole Bie, was woken up by the arrival of a British official, who demanded his surrender. With only 44 men at his disposal, Bie was not able to resist, and would subsequently surrender without opposition.

Thereby Serampore's capture was unattended by the consequences of a siege, and the British flag would be hoisted without a gun being fired.

== Aftermath ==
Immediately after, Colonel Dickson detached a party of sepoys under the command of Captain Morris to guard the place. However, the occupation did not last long, and in the following year, Britain would retreat from Danish India in coordination with the Treaty of Amiens.

== See also ==
- Capture of Tranquebar (1801) – Capture of Tranquebar by British forces in 1801
- Surrender of Tranquebar (1808) – 1808 capture of a European fort in India
- English Wars (Scandinavia) – 1807–1814 war in Northern and Western Europe
- Battle of Copenhagen (1801) – 1801 battle of the War of the Second Coalition and the English Wars
- Peter Anker

== Works cited ==
- Debrett, J. (1803). "Bengal occurences of May 1801". The Asiatic Annual Register, Or, A View of the History of Hindustan, and of the Politics, Commerce and Literature of Asia for the Year ... J. Debrett.
- Engevold, Per Ivar Hjeldsbakken (2022-03-07). Nordmenn i slavefart (in Norwegian). Humanist forlag As. ISBN 978-82-8282-218-3.
- Hough, James (1845). The History of Christianity in India: From the Commencement of the Christian Era. R.B. Seeley and W. Burnside: and sold by L. and G. Seeley, Fleet Street, London.
- Lisberg, Bering (2020). Danmarks søfart og søhandel (in Danish). Vol. 1. SAGA Egmont. ISBN 978-87-26-30660-6.
- Petersen, Sofie (1946). Danmarks gamle Tropekolonier (in Danish). Det Kongelige danske geografiske selskab. ISBN 978-87-26-30660-6.
