= Ranks and insignia of the Royal Danish Air Force =

The Royal Danish Air Force ranks follow the NATO system of ranks and insignia, as does the rest of the Danish Defence. The ranks used are based on the Royal Air Force, with some minor changes. For example, three strips in the RAF is an OF-4, while only an OF-3 in Denmark.

== Current ranks ==
=== Officers ===
The highest officer's rank is OF-9 (General) which is reserved for the Chief of Defence (only when this seat is occupied by an Air Force officer). Similarly, OF-8 (Lieutenant general) is reserved for the Vice Chief of Defence. OF-7 (Major general) is used by the chief of the Air Staff and OF-6 (Brigadegeneral) by the chief of a brigade as well as keepers of high-office positions.

| NATO code | OF-10 | OF-9 | OF-8 | OF-7 | OF-6 | OF-5 | OF-4 | OF-3 | OF-2 | OF-1 |
|---|---|---|---|---|---|---|---|---|---|---|---|---|
| Royal Danish Air Force |
| Royal Danish Air Force | | General | Generalløjtnant | Generalmajor | Brigadegeneral | Oberst | Oberstløjtnant | Major | Kaptajn | Premierløjtnant | Løjtnant | Sekondløjtnant |
| Shirt insignia |
| Danish Pay Grade | | M406 | M405 | M404 | M403 | M402 | M401 | M332 M331 M322 | M321 | M312 | M311 | M310 |

==== Rank flags ====
| Rank | General | Generalløjtnant | Generalmajor | Brigadegeneral |
|---|---|---|---|---|
| 1979–present | | | | |

=== Other ranks ===
The rank insignia of non-commissioned officers and enlisted personnel.

| NATO code | OR-9 | OR-8 | OR-7 | OR-6 | OR-5 | | OR-4 | OR-3 | OR-2 | OR-1 |
|---|---|---|---|---|---|---|---|---|---|---|
| Royal Danish Air Force |
| Royal Danish Air Force | Chefsergent | Seniorsergent | Oversergent | | Sergent | Sergent (Officerselev) | Korporal | Flyverspecialist | Flyveroverkonstabel | Flyverkonstabel |
| Shoulder board |
| Danish Pay Grade | M232 | M231 | M221 | | M212 | M211 | M113 | M112 |

==== Additional ranks ====
| NATO Code | OR-9 | | OR-8 | OR-5 | OR-1 |
|---|---|---|---|---|---|---|
| Service uniform |
| Shoulder board |
| Danish | Flyvevåbnets Chefsergent | Myndighedschefsergent/ Wingchefsergent | Myndighedsbefalingsmand/ Eskadrillebefalingsmand/ Afdelingsbefalingsmand | Befalingsmandselev | Flyverkonstabelelev | Værnepligtig menig |
| English | Chief Master Sergeant of the Royal Danish Air Force | Wing Command Senior; Enlisted Leader | Squadron Command Senior; Enlisted Leader | Sergeant trainee | Aircraftman, trainee | Conscript |

Colour structure for OR-1–3
| | Technical | Administrations | Operations |
| Shoulder board |

=== Clerical personnel ===
Clerical personnel

Air Force Dean

Air Force Chaplain

Air Force Conscript Chaplain

== Types of rank insignia ==
| Rank (example) | MTS | | Pilot suit | Pullover | Service | |
| Rank (example) | Home | INTOPS | Pilot suit | Pullover | Shirt | Sleeve |
|---|---|---|---|---|---|---|
| Chefsergent | | | None | | | |
| Kaptajn | | | | | | |

== Historical ranks ==
=== Officer ranks ===
In 1927, the rank of Luftmarsk (transl. air marshal) was proposed by Christian Førslev as a rank for the potential Chief of the Royal Danish Air Force. The rank would have been equivalent to a major general.

==== Timeline ====
| Rank group | General/Flag/Air officers | | | | Senior officers | | | Junior officers |
|---|---|---|---|---|---|---|---|---|---|---|---|---|
| 1950–1951 |
| 1950–1951 | General | Generalløjtnant | Generalmajor | | Oberst | Oberstløjtnant | | Kaptajn | Kaptajnløjtnant | Flyverløjtnant 1 | | Flyverløjtnant 2 |
| 1951–1962 |
| 1951–1962 | General | Generalløjtnant | Generalmajor | | Oberst | Oberstløjtnant | | Kaptajn | Kaptajnløjtnant | Flyverløjtnant 1 | | Flyverløjtnant 2 |
| 1962–1970 |
| 1962–1970 | General | Generalløjtnant | Generalmajor | | Oberst | Oberstløjtnant | Major | Kaptajn | | Flyverløjtnant 1 | | Flyverløjtnant 2 |
| 1970–1983 |
| 1970–1983 | General | Generalløjtnant | Generalmajor | | Oberst | Oberstløjtnant | Major | Kaptajn | | Premierløjtnant | Løjtnant | Sekondløjtnant |
| 1983–2009 |
| 1983–2009 | General | Generalløjtnant | Generalmajor | Brigadegeneral | Oberst | Oberstløjtnant | Major | Kaptajn | | Premierløjtnant | | Løjtnant |

=== Other ranks ===
| Rank group | Senior NCOs | | | | | Junior NCOs | | | Enlisted |
|---|---|---|---|---|---|---|---|---|---|---|---|
| 1959–1962 |
| 1959–1962 | | | Oversergent | Sergent | | Korporal | | Flyverelev | | Math | Mathelev |
| 1962–1989 |
| 1962–1989 | Seniorsergent af 1. grad | Seniorsergent af 2. grad | Oversergent | Sergent | Sergent (conscipted) | Korporal | Korporal (conscipted) | Overkonstabel af 1. grad | Overkonstabel af 2. grad | Konstabel |
| –present |
| –present | Chefsergent | Seniorsergent | Oversergent | Sergent | Sergent (Officerselev) | Korporal | | Flyverspecialist | Flyveroverkonstabel | Flyverkonstabel | Flyverkonstabelelev |

==== Warrant officers ====
| Rank group | Warrant officers |
|---|---|---|---|---|---|
| 1951–1962 |
| 1951–1962 | Kaptajn af specialgruppen | Kaptajnløjtnant af specialgruppen | Flyverløjtnant af 1. grad af specialgruppen | Overfenrik | Fenrik |
| 1962–1970 |
| 1962–1970 | Major af specialgruppen | Kaptajn af specialgruppen | Premierløjtnant af specialgruppen | Overfenrik | Fenrik |
