= Plunder of Nancowry =

1805 engagement of the English Wars

- Part of the English Wars
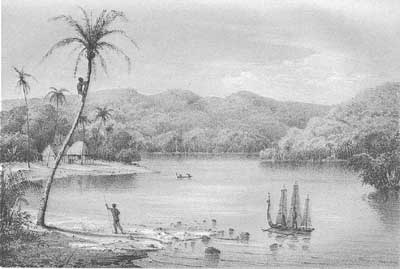
- Danish harbour at Nancorwy, by Johan Christian Thornam
Date	1805
Location	Nancowry Island, Nicobar Islands (present-day India) 7.98°N 93.55°E
Result	British victory
Territorial changes	Danish settlement in Nancowry destroyed

Belligerents
United Kingdom	Denmark-Norway

Commanders and leaders
(United Kingdom of Great Britain and Ireland) Blom	(Denmark–Norway) Emanuel Dietjens

Units involved
(United Kingdom of Great Britain and Ireland) Amboyna	(Denmark–Norway) Danish guards

Strength
1 ship	Multiple ships

Casualties and losses
Unknown	Unknown

The plunder of Nancowry (Danish: Plyndringen af Nancovryhavn) or the Battle of Nancowry (Danish: Slaget ved Nancovryhavn) was the British capture of the Danish colony at Nancowry Island (Ny Sjælland) in 1805.

== Background ==
In 1756, the Danish flag was hoisted at the island of Great Nicobar (Ny Sjælland), and the colonial attempt also spread to Nancowry Island, however, these attempts already failed the next year. For the rest of the 18th century, Denmark would try to establish a colonial presence on the Nicobar Islands.

In 1801 hostilities broke out between Denmark–Norway and Great Britain, and these hostilities would spread to India. On 12 May Tranquebar would be occupied along with Serampore.

== Battle ==
Initially, the Danish Nicobar Islands (Frederiksnagore) were left out of the British occupation, and in 1802 a ship arrived with more supplies and men. In 1805, on the basis of the war between Denmark and Great Britain, a British privateer named Blom arrived at the harbour of Nancowry. Together with his vessel, Amboyna, Blom would dislodge the Danish forces there and looted the godowns and residences, before leaving the harbour again.

== Aftermath ==
In the following year, the Danes would revisit the island, and the Danish command would be re-established. In 1807, the islands would be left to themselves again because of the Gunboat War, and two years later, in 1809, the British would come to the island and transport the leftover garrison to Tranquebar.

== See also ==
- British occupation of Serampore (1763) – 1763 siege and occupation of Serampore
- Battle of Copenhagen (1801) – 1801 battle of the War of the Second Coalition and the English Wars
- Battle of West Kay – 1801 battle of the English Wars
- Austrian colonization of the Nicobar Islands

== Works cited ==
- Larsen, Kay (1940). Guvernører, Residenter, Kommandanter og Chefer (PDF) (in Danish). Copenhagen: ARTHUR JENSENS FORLAG.
- Verner, Madsen (1984). Peder Hansen (PDF) (in Danish). Odense Universitetsforlag.
- Liisberg, H. C. Bering (2020-01-13). Danmarks søfart og søhandel. Bind 1 (in Danish). Lindhardt og Ringhof. ISBN 978-87-26-30660-6.
- Society, Burma Research (1960). Fiftieth Anniversary Publications: Selection of articles from the Journal of the Burma Research Society (history and literature). Burma Research Society.
