= Ranks and insignia of the Royal Danish Army =

The ranks and insignia of the Royal Danish Army follows the NATO system of ranks and insignia, as does the rest of the Danish Defence. The ranks are based around German and French military terms.

== Current ranks ==
The current insignia for the Royal Danish Army was introduced along with the introduction of the MultiCam uniform. This sand coloured insignia replaced the older standard green slip-on and all other special slip-ons.

=== Officers ===
The officers can be split into two groups: the leadership level (OF-9–OF-4) and the management level (OF-3–OF-1).

The highest rank is General which is reserved for the Monarch and Chief of Defence (only when this seat is occupied by an army/air force officer). Lieutenant general is reserved for the Chief of the Defense Staff and the Chief of Acquisition, previously the Chief of the Royal Danish Army, which is now a Major general. Other major generals include Commander, Joint Arctic Command, Commander, Special Operations Command and Chief of Defence Estate Agency. Brigade general is usually the chief of a brigade as well as keepers of high-office positions.

NATO code	OF-10	OF-9	OF-8	OF-7	OF-6	OF-5	OF-4	OF-3	OF-2	OF-1
Group	Leadership level (Chefniveau)							Management level (Lederniveau)
Combat uniform
Royal Danish Army
Royal Danish Army		General	Generalløjtnant	Generalmajor	Brigadegeneral	Oberst	Oberstløjtnant	Major	Kaptajn	Premierløjtnant	Løjtnant	Sekondløjtnant
Medical					Generallæge	Stabslæge I Stabstandlæge I Stabsdyrlæge I	Stabslæge II; Stabstandlæge II; Stabsdyrlæge II	Overlæge; Overtandlæge; Overdyrlæge; Afdelingslæge; Afdelingstandlæge; Afdelingsdyrlæge	Reservelæge I Reservetandlæge I Reservedyrlæge I	Reservelæge II; Reservetandlæge II; Reservedyrlæge II	Reservelæge III; Reservetandlæge III; Reservedyrlæge III
Danish Pay Grade	M406		M405	M404	M403	M402	M401	M332 M331 M322	M321	M312	M311	M310

==== Rank flags ====
Rank	General	Generalløjtnant	Generalmajor	Brigadegeneral
1979–present				

== Other ranks ==
The rank insignia of non-commissioned officers and enlisted personnel.

NATO code	OR-9	OR-8	OR-7	OR-6	OR-5		OR-4	OR-3	OR-2	OR-1
Group	Middle management level (Mellemlederniveau)						Manual level (Manuelt niveau)
Combat uniform
Royal Danish Army
Royal Danish Army	Chefsergent	Seniorsergent	Oversergent		Sergent	Sergent (Officerselev)	Korporal	Overkonstabel af 1. grad	Overkonstabel	Konstabel
Danish Pay Grade	M232	M231	M221		M212	M211	M113	M112

=== Additional ranks ===
NATO Code	OR-9		OR-8	OR-5	OR-3	OR-2	OR-1
Combat uniform
Service uniform
Danish	Hærchefsergenten	Regiments-, brigade- og skole chefsergent	Regiments- og brigade-, seniorsergent	Sergentelev	Overkonstabel 1. grad, meniggruppefører	Overkonstabel, meniggruppefører	Konstabel, meniggruppefører	Konstabelelev	Meniggruppefører
English	Sergeant Major of the Army	Command sergeant major	Command sergeant major	Sergeant trainee	Lance corporal, section commander	Private first class, section commander	Private, section commander	Private recruit	Conscript, section commander

=== Clerical personnel ===
Clerical personnel

Army Dean

Army Chaplain

Army Conscript Chaplain

== Types of rank insignia ==
Rank (example)	TAN499	MTS	Service uniform (M/69)			Galla		Mess
Rank (example)	TAN499	MTS	Shoulder	Shirt	Sleeve	Red	Blue	Black
Chefsergent			None (Note: NCOs of the Guard Hussar Regiment, Royal Life Guards wear the Monarch's monogram, NCOs in the Jutland Dragoon Regiment wear Prince Henrik's monogram.)					
Kaptajn					None			

== Historical ranks ==
=== Officer ranks ===
In 1801, new uniforms were introduced for the whole army. Along with the new uniforms, epaulette ranks were introduced for officers. Following the defeat in the English Wars in 1812, Denmark was on the brink of financial bankruptcy, resulting in drastic reductions in the military. Therefore, only generals were allowed to wear epaulettes, with other ranks reverting to cuff insignia. In 1822, epaulettes were introduced to all ranks.

==== Modern ranks ====
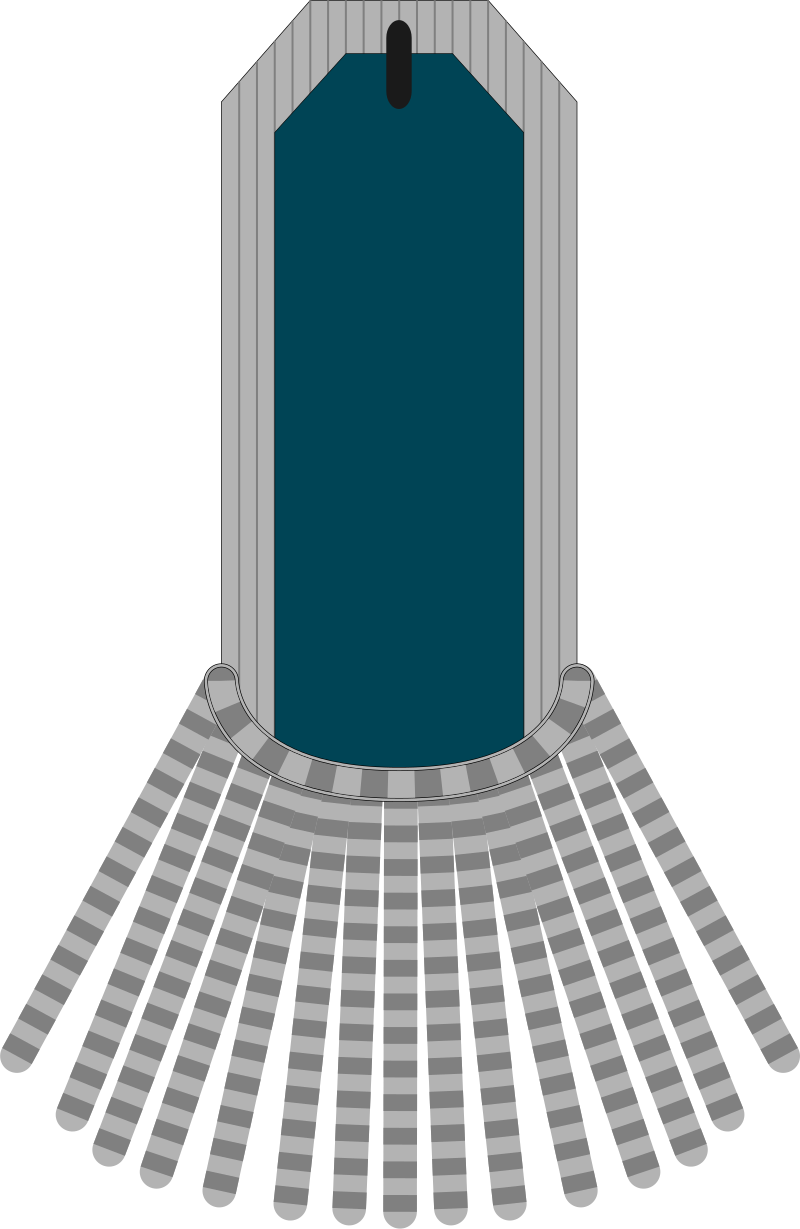
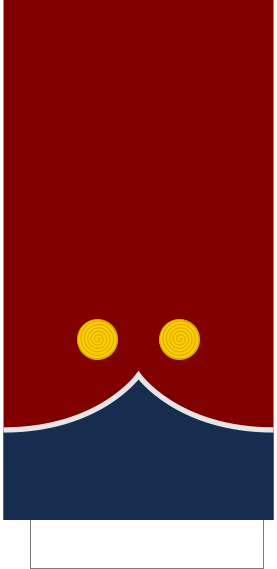
Rank group	General / flag officers					Senior officers			Junior officers
1801–1812	No insignia
1801–1812	Feltmarskal	General	General-Lieutenant	General-Major		Oberst	Oberst-Lieutenant	Major	Capitain		Premier-Lieutenant	Second-Lieutenant	Fendrich
1812–1816	No insignia
1812–1816	Feltmarskal	General	Generallieutenant	Generalmajor		Oberst	Oberst-Lieutenant	Major	Capitain		Premier-Lieutenant		Second-Lieutenant
1816–1821	No insignia
1816–1821	Feltmarskal	General	Generallieutenant	Generalmajor		Oberst	Oberstlieutenant	Major	Captain		Premierlieutenant		Secondlieutenant
1821–1842	No insignia
1821–1842	Feltmarskal	General	Generallieutenant	Generalmajor		Oberst	Oberstlieutenant	Major	Captain		Premierlieutenant		Secondlieutenant
1842–1848	No insignia
1842–1848	Feltmarskal	General	Generallieutenant	Generalmajor		Oberst	Oberstlieutenant	Major	Captain		Premierlieutenant		Secondlieutenant
1849–1858
1849–1858		General	Generallieutenant	Generalmajor		Oberst	Oberstlieutenant	Major	Captain		Premierlieutenant		Secondlieutenant
1858–1869
1858–1869		General	Generallieutenant	Generalmajor		Oberst	Oberstlieutenant	Major	Captain		Premierlieutenant		Secondlieutenant
1869–1889
1869–1889		General (Note: Between 1867 and 1880, only a single "general" rank existed. Generals wore one–star. However, the King still wore three–stars, while former Generallieutenants were allowed to keep their two–stars.)	Generallieutenant	Generalmajor		Oberst			Captain		Premierlieutenant	Lieutenant af Forstærkningen	Sekondlieutenant
1889–1903
1889–1903		General	Generallieutenant	Generalmajor		Oberst	Oberstlieutenant		Captain		Premierlieutenant	Lieutenant af Forstærkningen	Sekondlieutenant
1903–1910
1903–1910		General	Generalløjtnant	Generalmajor		Oberst	Oberstløjtnant		Kaptajn		Premierløjtnant	Løjtnant	Sekondløjtnant
1910–1915
1910–1915		General	Generalløjtnant	Generalmajor		Oberst	Oberstløjtnant		Kaptajn	Intendant	Premierløjtnant	Løjtnant	Sekondløjtnant
1915–1923
1915–1923		General	Generalløjtnant	Generalmajor		Oberst	Oberstløjtnant		Kaptajn		Premierløjtnant	Løjtnant af Reserven	Sekondløjtnant
1923–1962
1923–1962		General	Generalløjtnant	Generalmajor		Oberst	Oberstløjtnant		Kaptajn (Note: Ritmester was the equivalent rank. It last appeared in 1923 and was removed by 1951.)	Kaptajnløjtnant	Premierløjtnant	Løjtnant af Reserven	Sekondløjtnant
1962–1970
1962–1970		General	Generalløjtnant	Generalmajor		Oberst	Oberstløjtnant	Major	Kaptajn		Premierløjtnant	Løjtnant af Reserven	Sekondløjtnant
1970–1983
1970–1983		General	Generalløjtnant	Generalmajor		Oberst	Oberstløjtnant	Major	Kaptajn		Premierløjtnant	Løjtnant af Reserven	Sekondløjtnant
1983–1986
1983–1986		General	Generalløjtnant	Generalmajor	Brigadegeneral	Oberst	Oberstløjtnant	Major	Kaptajn		Premierløjtnant	Løjtnant af Reserven	Sekondløjtnant
1986–1989
1989–2009
2009–present
		General	Generalløjtnant	Generalmajor	Brigadegeneral	Oberst	Oberstløjtnant	Major	Kaptajn		Premierløjtnant	Løjtnant	Sekondløjtnant
NATO code	OF-10	OF-9	OF-8	OF-7	OF-6	OF-5	OF-4	OF-3	OF-2		OF-1

=== Other ranks ===
From 1789 up to 1812, ncos were typically told apart from rank & file by a short epaulette, worn on the right shoulder, and by gold lace on their hats. Most of them also carried a cane, and up to 1805, a polearm. Sergeants were typically told apart by wearing metallic lace edging on their shoulder straps.

During the 1801 - 1803 period, lance-corporals of most branches of the army but the line infantry adopted lighter distinctions, such as silver cords on their hats, sword knots, metallic shoulder straps, NCO belt buckles (in the cavalry) and prickers (in the light infantry).

In 1806, corporals were allowed to wear short epaulettes on both shoulders, in those corps where lance-corporals wore a single epaulette themselves.

Around 1808, the sergeant's epaulette became much wider, and they were also allowed to wear double cords on their new shakos.

As of 1806, the sergeant-major was told apart by a metallic sword knot and tassel. However, the ranks of "commandeer-sergeant" and "sergeant" were pretty much the same in most branches of the army during this time period, with the exception of the artillery. There was typically a single sergeant or commandeer-sergeant per company, both paid at the same rate. The distinction was typically in the company itself. While grenadier and centre companies had sergeants, light and rifle companies had sergeant-majors.

In 1812, with the adoption of cuff insignia, standardized distinctions were finally introduced. Lance-corporals were allowed to wear a single chevron and a yellow and red sword knot, corporals were allowed 2 and the same sword knot, sergeants were allowed 3 and had silver thread mixed into the sword knot. Additional grades were told apart by a rosette, worn in the middle of the cuff. These distinctions were sewn on the cuffs themselves, not right above them like those of field officers.

In 1962, the ranks of Seniorsergent first and second class were introduced, in part to increase the oversergenters attachment to the military.

==== Timeline ====
Rank group	NCO						Enlisted
1812–1843
1812–1843			Kommandersergent	Sergent		Korporal		Vicekorporal		Menig
1843–1848
1843–1848		Overkommandersergent	Kommandersergent	Sergeant		Korporal		Underkorporal		Menig
1848–1867
1848–1867		Overkommandersergent	Kommandersergent	Sergeant		Korporal		Underkorporal		Menig
1867–1903
1867–1903		Stabssergent	Oversergent	Sergent		Korporal		Underkorporal		Menig
1903–1910
1903–1910		Stabssergent	Oversergent	Sergent		Korporal		Underkorporal		Menig
1910–1915
1910–1915		Stabssergent	Oversergent	Sergent	Kornet	Korporal		Underkorporal		Menig
1915–1923
1915–1923		Stabssergent	Oversergent	Sergent	Kornet	Korporal		Underkorporal		Menig
1923–1951
1923–1951			Oversergent	Sergent	Kornet	Korporal		Underkorporal		Menig
1951–1962
1951–1962			Oversergent	Sergent		Korporal		Befalingsmandselev		Math	Mathelev
1962–1965
1962–1965	Seniorsergent af 1. grad	Seniorsergent af 2. grad	Oversergent	Sergent		Korporal			Overkonstabel	Konstable	Konstabelelev
1965–1970
1965–1970	Seniorsergent af 1. grad	Seniorsergent af 2. grad	Oversergent	Sergent	Sergent (conscript)	Korporal	Korporal (conscript)		Overkonstabel	Konstable	Konstabelelev
1970–1982
1970–1982	Seniorsergent af 1. grad	Seniorsergent af 2. grad	Oversergent	Sergent	Sergent (conscript)	Korporal		Overkonstabel af 1. grad	Overkonstabel af 2. grad	Konstable	Konstabelelev
1982–2008
1982–2008	Chefsergent	Seniorsergent	Oversergent	Sergent	Sergent (conscript)	Korporal		Overkonstabel af 1. grad	Overkonstabel	Konstable	Konstabelelev
2008–present
2008–present	Chefsergent	Seniorsergent	Oversergent	Sergent			Korporal	Overkonstabel af 1. grad	Overkonstabel	Konstable	Konstabelelev
NATO code	OR-9	OR-8	OR-7	OR-5		OR-4		OR-3	OR-2	OR-1

==== Warrant officers ====
In 1922, a new reform of the Army was adopted. Here Underofficer af Linien (Sub-officers of the line) were replaced with Officiantgruppen.

1922 suggested rank structure
Officers	Kaptajn (Ritmester) af Reserven	—N/a		Premierløjtnant	Løjtnant af Reserven	Sekondløjtnant
Warrant officers	—N/a	Korpsofficiant af 1. Grad	Korpsofficiant af 2. Grad	Stabsofficiant	Overofficiant	Officiant

Rank group	Warrant officers
1923–1951
1923–1951		Korpsofficiant	Stabsofficiant	Overofficiant	Officiant
1951–1962 (Note: Officer insignia also included a bar on the lapel to signify affiliation.)
1951–1962	Kaptajn af specialgruppen	Kaptajnløjtnant af specialgruppen	Premierløjtnant af specialgruppen	Overfenrik	Fenrik
1962–1970
1962–1970	Major af specialgruppen	Kaptajn af specialgruppen	Premierløjtnant af specialgruppen	Overfenrik	Fenrik
