= Sergeant Major of the Army (Denmark) =

Most senior enlisted member of the Danish Army

- Hærchefsergenten
- Incumbent; Jesper Madsen Mølgaard since June 2024
- Royal Danish Army NCO corps
- Reports to: Chief of the Army Staff
- Formation: 31 October 2014
- First holder: Henning Bæk
- Salary: 30,174.64 kr. (Note: Estimate based on Sergeant Major salary.) per month (US$ 4,797)
- Website: Official Facebook

The Sergeant Major of the Army (Danish: Hærchefsergenten, lit. 'Army chief sergeant') is the most senior member of the other ranks of the Danish Army. The appointment holder has the rank of Chefsergeant (English: Sergeant Major). The post was created as part of the changes to the Danish Army in Autumn 2014, and is inspired by the American equivalent. The holder is appointed to serve as adviser for the Army Staff and as well as a representative for all army NCOs. The holder will further more be conveying his own and army leadership messages, and attitudes to army personal. In 2016, the Royal Danish Air Force created the Chief Master Sergeant of the Royal Danish Air Force. In 2018, the equivalent for the navy, Master Chief Petty Officer of the Royal Danish Navy, was created.

The first holder is Henning Bæk, who was appointed in October 2014. Bæk expressed interest in focusing on uniform and grooming standards, and intendeded to stay at the post between four and six years.

== Insignia ==
2014-2016, the standard insignia for all Sergeants Major in the Danish army

2018–present

On 13 December 2016, a new insignia was introduced for the Sergeant Major of the Army, who had formerly used the standard Sergeant Major insignia. The new insignia was created with the help of the Danish National Archives' Heraldry consultant.

== List of officeholders ==
No.	Portrait	Name (born–died)	Term of office			Ref.
No.	Portrait	Name (born–died)	Took office	Left office	Time in office	Ref.
1		Henning Bæk (born ?)	1 December 2014	31 may 2024	9 years, 6 months	
2		Jesper Madsen Mølgaard (born 1975)	1 June 2024	Incumbent	2 years, 3 months	
