= Johan Rantzau =

German-Danish general and statesman

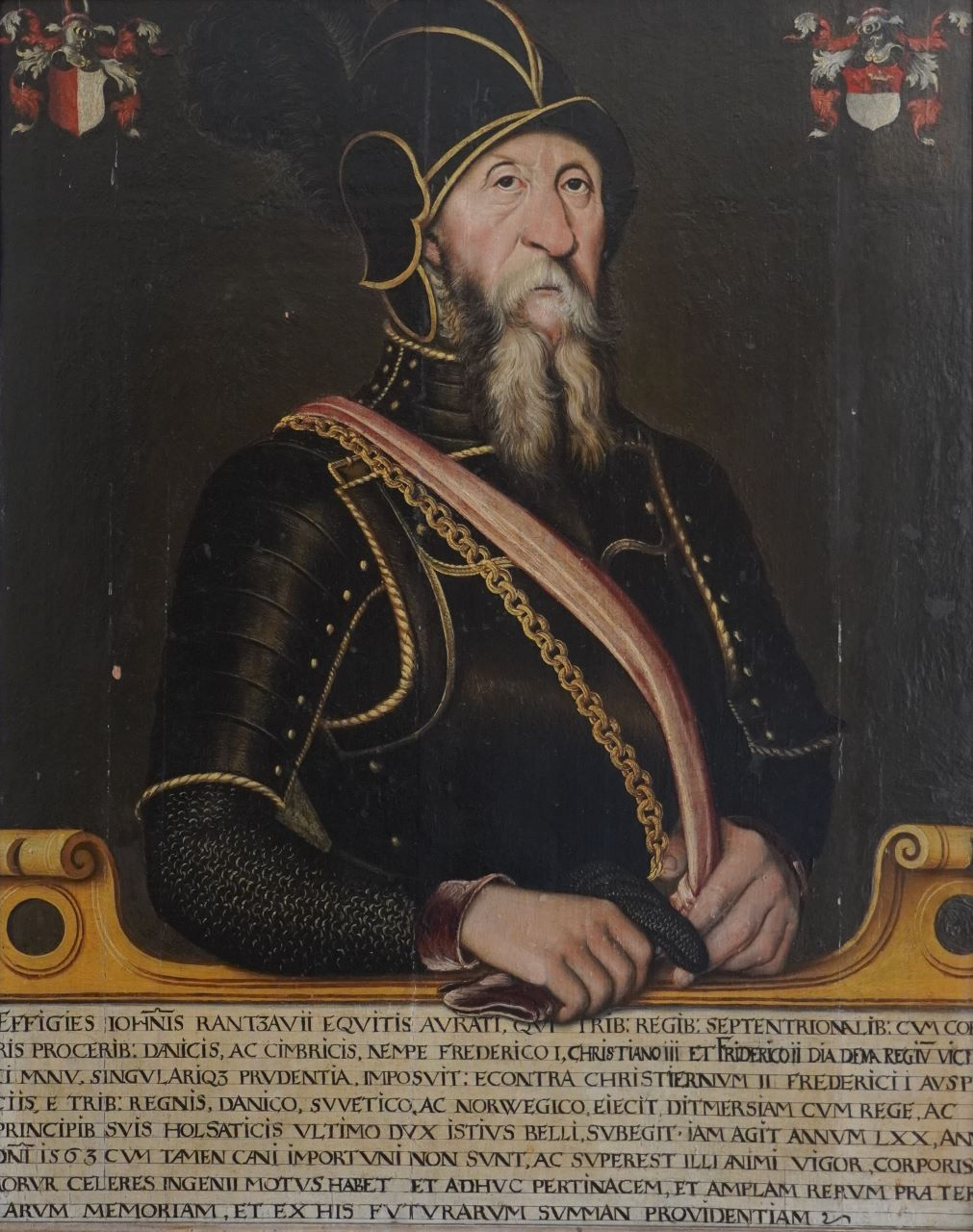
- Born: 12 November 1492; Steinburg, Duchy of Holstein
- Died: 12 December 1565 (aged 73); Itzehoe, Duchy of Holstein
- Burial place: St James' Church, Lübeck
- Spouse: Anna Walstrop (m. 1525)
- Children: Heinrich Rantzau
- Military career
- Allegiance: Christian III
- Branch: Royal Danish Army
- Rank: Field marshal
- Conflicts: Scanian peasant rebellion; Count's Feud; Battle of Aalborg; Battle of Øksnebjerg; Siege of Copenhagen; Conquest of Dithmarschen

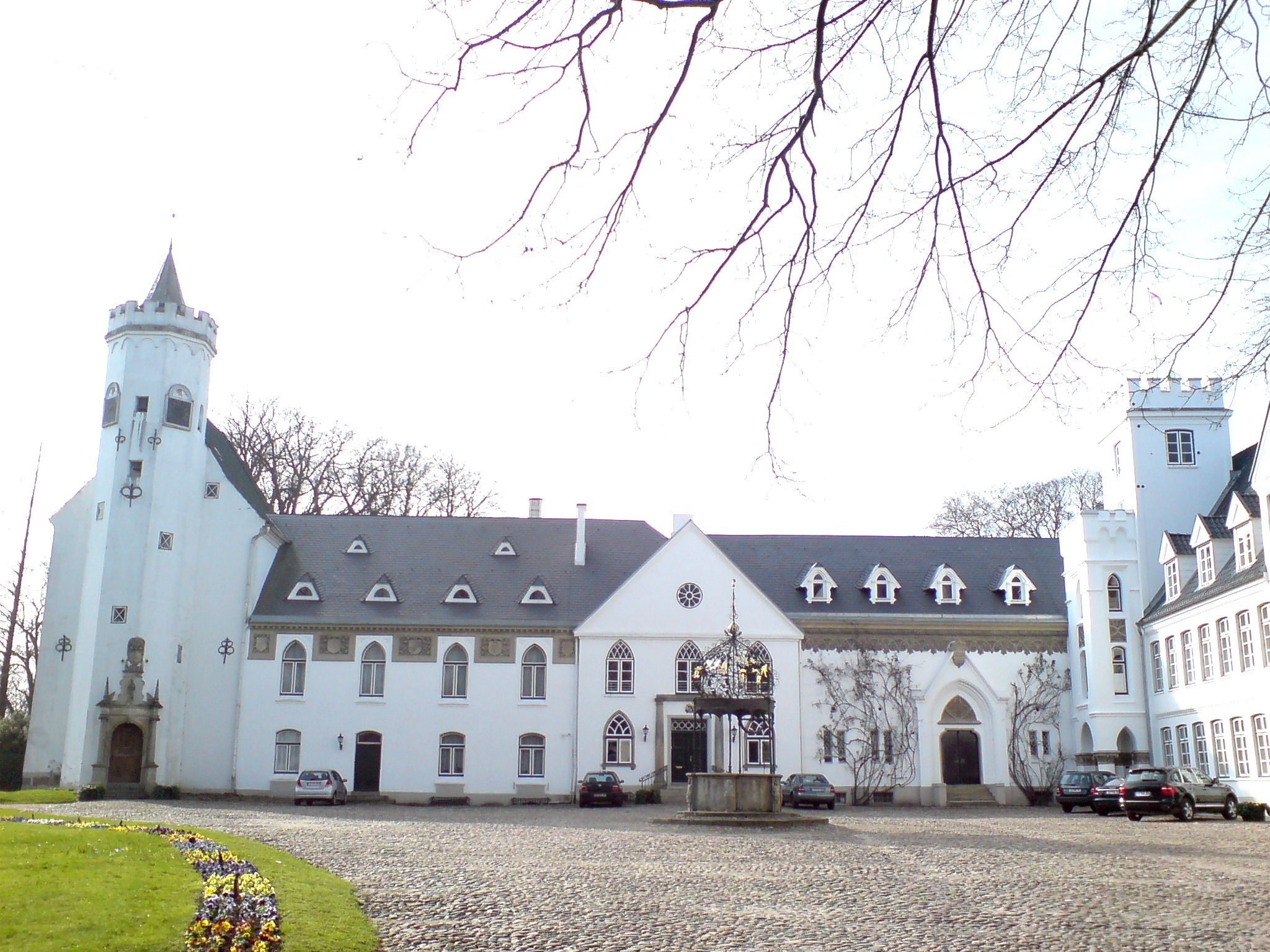
Schloss Breitenburg at Steinburg

Johan Rantzau (12 November 1492 – 12 December 1565) was a German-Danish field marshal and statesman known for his role in the Count's Feud. His military leadership ensured the succession of Christian III to the throne, which brought about the Reformation in Denmark.

== Biography ==
Rantzau was born at Schloss Breitenburg at Steinburg near Itzehoe in Schleswig-Holstein. He was born into nobility as the son of Henrik Breidesen Rantzau (1434–1497) and Ollegaard Ditlevsdatter von Buchwald (1458–1538). His family had come into the service of the Danish king after the union between Denmark and the duchies of Schleswig and Holstein, but he was loyal to the rulers of the latter. From his early years he sought a military career and was educated an officer and a mercenary (landsknecht), but at the same time he also acted as an important political advisor of the duke.

When King Christian II of Denmark was overthrown in 1523 by King Frederick I, Rantzau led Frederick's army of conquest. He became a member of the Danish Privy Council as well as governor of the duchies and was the most important of the king's non-Danish advisors. At the same time he emerged a squire of Holstein, making the manor house Schloss Breitenburg his entailed estate. Among his military missions was his fight against the Scanian peasant rebellion (Bondeoprør) of 1525 that was bloodily crushed. During these years he also became a devout Protestant, working together with his Danish colleagues on advancing the Lutheran cause.

Rantzau became especially notable due to his participation in the Count's Feud from 1534–1536. Together with the Holstein nobility, he supported Christian III in spite of the latter's desperate situation. An attempt at conquering Funen in 1534 ended in a defeat and a humiliating retreat, but in the same year Rantzau crushed Skipper Clement's peasant rebellion in Jutland and secured the peninsula for the king. The next year, he successfully conquered Funen, defeating Count Christopher of Oldenburg’s army at the Battle of Øksnebjerg (Slaget ved Øksnebjerg) and finally leading the siege of Copenhagen that ended with the triumph of Christian III.

After the war, Rantzau continued being the king’s general and advisor, but he was pushed into the background in Denmark while concentrating on Holstein affairs. In 1545 he resigned as the governor of Schleswig and Holstein in protest against the threefold division of the duchies between King Christian III and his brothers John the Elder and Adolf the year before. However, he went back into the active service of King Frederick II of Denmark during the summer of 1559 as the leader of the conquest of Dithmarschen, known as the Last Feud. Peace was concluded at Lohe on 20 June 1559.

== Personal life ==
In 1525, Johan Rantzau was married to Anna Walstrop (ca. 1505-1582). He died during 1565 at Itzehoe. Rantzau's son Heinrich Rantzau (1526–1598) was an outstanding Holstein cattle lord, governor, and squire of cultural and literary interests. Heinrich's biography of his father is the main source of the latter's life. He was the great-grandfather of Danish military leader and Marshal of France Josias von Rantzau (1609–1650).

== Literature ==
- Dansk Biografisk Leksikon, vol.11, Copenh. 1982.
- Politikens Danmarkshistorie, vol 5, by Johan Hvidtfeldt. Copenh. 1963.
- Politikens Danmarkshistorie, vol 6, by Svend Cedergreen Bech, Copenh. 1963.
