= General (Denmark) =

Highest military rank of the Danish Army and Air force

General General
- Rank flag

- Army and Air force insignia

- Vehicle Star Plate
- Country: Denmark
- Service branch: Royal Danish Army; Royal Danish Air Force
- Abbreviation: GEN
- Rank group: General officer
- NATO rank code: OF-9
- Pay grade: M406
- Formation: 1567
- Next higher rank: Feltmarskalk (until 1842)
- Next lower rank: Generalløjtnant
- Equivalent ranks: Admiral

General (Danish pronunciation: [ɡenəˈʁaːˀl]) is the highest rank of the Royal Danish Army and Royal Danish Air Force. As a four-star rank it is the equivalent to the rank of admiral in the Royal Danish Navy.

The rank is rated OF-9 within NATO. It has the grade of M406 within the Ministry of Defence's pay structure. The rank of General is reserved for the Chief of Defence and the King À la suite.

== History ==
The rank can be traced back to 24 October 1567, when Daniel Rantzau was made "Captain general and Field commander" (Danish: generalkaptajn og feltoberst) by Frederick II. Until the Thirty Years' War, the rank was known as "uppermost general" (Danish: general-øfverste).

Since Denmark used German as the official command language, and was using heavily inspired German ranks, and the rank was later made service specific, with "General of the infantry" and "General of the cavalry". On 25 May 1671, the ranks were codified, by King Christian V, with the publication of the Danish order of precedence. Here generals of the branch were placed below Lieutenant field marshal (Danish: Feltmarskal Lieutenant), and above the noble rank of Count and the military rank of Lieutenant general.

Following the 1842 reform, the field marshal ranks were removed, making full general the highest rank and exclusive for the King and Hereditary Prince Ferdinand. As part of the Army Reform of 1867, the ranks of Major, Lieutenant colonel were removed and only a single "General" rank was kept. After the 1880 reform, the general officer ranks were reintroduced. Commanding generals of the 1st and 2nd General Command were made Lieutenant generals while everyone else were made Major general. (Note: Officers who were promoted between 1867–1880, were still referred to as general after 1880, rather than major general.) Again making the general exclusive for royalty.

With the creation of the Danish Defence and Defence Command, it was decided that officers promoted to Chief of Defence, be given the rank of general or admiral. At the same time, the rank of general was also adopted as the highest rank for the newly created independent air force.

== Insignia ==
The first official uniform was instituted on 29 September 1737. The first few uniform designs have not survived, though they were likely red, highly ornamented coats without collar. The red coat remained until 1768, when Comte de Saint-Germain instituted white uniforms for generals, these were however removed shortly after, in 1769. In 1772, the first real ranks were introduced to the Danish Army; these were gold rings on the cuffs, with three for full generals, two for Lieutenant generals, and one for major generals. This uniform saw a number of changes until 1785, when the cuff ranks were removed.

In 1801, new uniforms were introduced for the whole army. Along with the new uniforms, epaulette ranks were introduced for officers, with generals wearing six-pointed stars on their epaulettes. The general ranks remained largely unchanged from their introduction until 1979, and the adoption of NATO STANAG 2116. The adoption created the new rank of Brigadier general, which would receive the one star, meaning the full general would end with 4 stars. However, four stars were considered too big for the shoulder insignia, a new insignia therefore created featuring Marshal batons. This insignia, was however, only used for a short period, and by Jørgen Lyng's appointment, the rank had changed to four-stars.

=== Rank insignia ===
Rank insignia for General

Army uniform (1801–1822)

Full dress (1822–1869)
Field uniform (1822–1849)

Full dress (1869–1889)
Field uniform (1849–1889)

Full dress (1889–1989)

Field uniform (1910–1915)

... (1915–1923)

Field/service (1923–1969)

Service (1969–1983)

... (1983–1989)

Full dress (1989–present)

Service (1989–present)

Air force shirt slip-on

Air force sleeve

== See also ==
- List of Danish full generals
- Ranks and insignia of Royal Danish Army
- Ranks and insignia of Royal Danish Air Force
