= British occupation of Serampore (1763) =

1763 siege and occupation of Serampore

Siege of Serampore
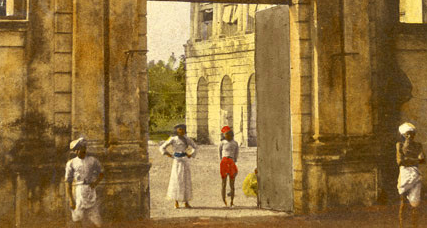
- Gateway to the Danish government house at Serampore, by Frederick Fiebig.
Date	4–15 April 1763
Location	Serampore, Danish India (present-day India) 22.75°N 88.34°E
Result	British victory
Territorial changes	Serampore temporarily occupied by Great Britain

Belligerents
Great Britain	Danish India

Commanders and leaders
(Kingdom of Great Britain) Unknown	(Danish India) Demarchis

Units involved
(Kingdom of Great Britain) English forces	(Danish India) Serampore garrison

Strength
Unknown	Unknown

Casualties and losses
Unknown	Unknown

The British occupation of Serampore also referred to as the English occupation of Serampore (Danish: Den engelske besættelse af Serampore) was a siege and thereafter a minor military occupation by the United Kingdom on the Danish trading post of Serampore (Frederiksnagore) in 1763.

== Background ==
In 1755 the Danes got permission from Alivardi Khan to establish a trading post at the Hooghly River near Calcutta. The colony of Frederiksnagore was established as a result of this agreement.

In 1756, the Nawab of Bengal, Siraj ud-Daulah, wanted the Danes to assist him in the Siege of Calcutta. However, because of bad living conditions, the Danes refused to support the siege, and ud-Daulah thereafter fined the Danes 25,000 Indian rupees. Later in 1757, the English would blockade the Danish vessel King of Denmark from entering Serampore, because of the Danish hospitality to the French.

== Occupation ==
A more serious incident with the British happened in 1763. Demarchis, the commander of Serampore, took office in 1762 and the British quickly took a hostile view of him. This hostility only grew bigger when some English sepoys were changed with 25 lashes each, because of their assaulting on Danish peons. As a response, a British force surrounded Serampore on 4 April and would besiege it until 15 April when the British could take over. The occupation did not last long though, and already in the same year, the British withdrew the city because of a Danish apology.

== Aftermath ==
As a result, this left Serampore being a rather impoverished colony in the first two decades of its existence. Subsequently, Demarchis would be deposed from his post as commander three years later in 1766 and would return to Copenhagen.

== See also ==
- Capture of Tranquebar – Capture of Tranquebar by British forces in 1801
- Carnatic wars – 18th-century wars between the French and the British
- Gondalpara
- Dano-Mughal War – Danish colonial conflict against the Mughal Empire

== Works cited ==
- Larsen, Kay (1940). Guvernører, Residenter, Kommandanter og Chefer (PDF) (in Danish). Copenhagen: ARTHUR JENSENS FORLAG. p. 61.
- Bhaduri, Saugata (2021-12-30). Polycoloniality: European Transactions with Bengal from the 13th to the 19th Century. Bloomsbury Publishing. ISBN 978-93-89812-56-5.
- O'Malley, Lewis Sydney Steward (1985). Hooghly. Logos.
