= Field marshal (Denmark) =

Former military rank of the Danish Army

Field marshal Feltmarskalk
- Country: Denmark
- Service branch: Royal Danish Army
- Rank group: General officer
- Rank: Field marshal
- Abolished: 1842
- Next higher rank: General field marshal
- Next lower rank: Quartermaster general (until 1699); Lieutenant field marshal (1699–1801); General (1801–1842)

Field marshal (Danish: Feltmarskalk; Danish pronunciation: [ˈfεldˌmɑːˌɕalˀ]) was the highest rank of the Royal Danish Army until its abolition in 1842.

== History ==
The origins of the rank can be traced back to the creation of the rank of field lord (Danish: feltherre) and field colonel (feltøverste, lit. 'field supreme'). These ranks were based on German origins.

Initially, there were two ranks: feltmarskalk was the highest cavalry commander, and feltoberst was the highest commander of the infantry. These were later merged to a single rank called feltmarskalk.

On 25 May 1671, the ranks were codified, by King Christian V, with the publication of the Danish order of precedence. Here General field marshal (Ober-Feldt-Marskalk) was the highest rank, with Feldt-Marschalks placed just below, and Quartermaster general below that.

== List of field marshals ==
Portrait	Name (born–died)	Appointed	Retired	Ref.
	Meindert van Ham (c. 1470–1545)	June 1536 (as Obrister Veldhaubtman)	5 August 1536 (POW)	
	Johan Rantzau (1492–1565)	1559 (as feltmarskalk)		
	Günther XLI, Count of Schwarzburg-Arnstadt (1529–1583)	1563 (as feltøverste, transl. Field colonel)		
	Hilmar von Quernheim (1508–1581)	1563 (as feltmarskalk)	15 December 1564	
	Otte Krumpen (1473–1569)	15 December 1564 (as feltoberst)	19 July 1565	
	Daniel Rantzau (1529–1569)	19 July 1565 (as feltoberst, transl. Field colonel); 24 October 1567 (as general kaptajn og feltoberst, transl. Field colonel)	11 November 1569 †	
	Josias von Qualen (?–1586)	12 November 1569 (as feltmarskalk)	1581	
	Hans Schack (1608–1676)	11 February 1659		
	Paul Würtz (1612–1676)	July 1665	31 October 1665	
	Claus von Ahlefeldt (1614–1674)	1671		
	John Adolphus, Duke of Schleswig-Holstein-Sonderburg-Plön (1634–1704)	20 January 1676 (as Overfeltmarskal)		
	Frédéric Charles de La Rochefoucauld (1633–1690)	May 1683 (as generalfeltmarskal)		
	Gustav Wilhelm Wedel of Jarlsberg (1641–1717)	1687		
	Frederick Ernest of Brandenburg-Kulmbach (1703–1762)	12 July 1745	1762	
	Werner von der Schulenburg (1679–1755)	1748 (as feltmarskal)	7 September 1755 #	
	Hans Jacob Arnoldt (1669–1758)	1749 (as feltmarskal)	24 December 1758 #	
	Michael Numsen (1686–1757)	30 June 1756	7 September 1757 #	
	Claude Louis, Comte de Saint-Germain (1707–1778)	1 December 1760	5 December 1767	
	Frederick Charles Ferdinand, Duke of Brunswick-Lüneburg (1729–1809)	1764	1784	
	Christian August of Augustenburg (1768–1810)	25 July 1808		
	Prince Charles of Hesse-Kassel (1744–1836)	1815	17 August 1836 #	
	Prince Frederik of Hesse (1771–1845)	17 August 1836	31 March 1842	

== See also ==
- Marshal of the Realm (Denmark)
- Ranks and insignia of Royal Danish Army
