= Last Feud =

16th century conflict in what is now northern Germany

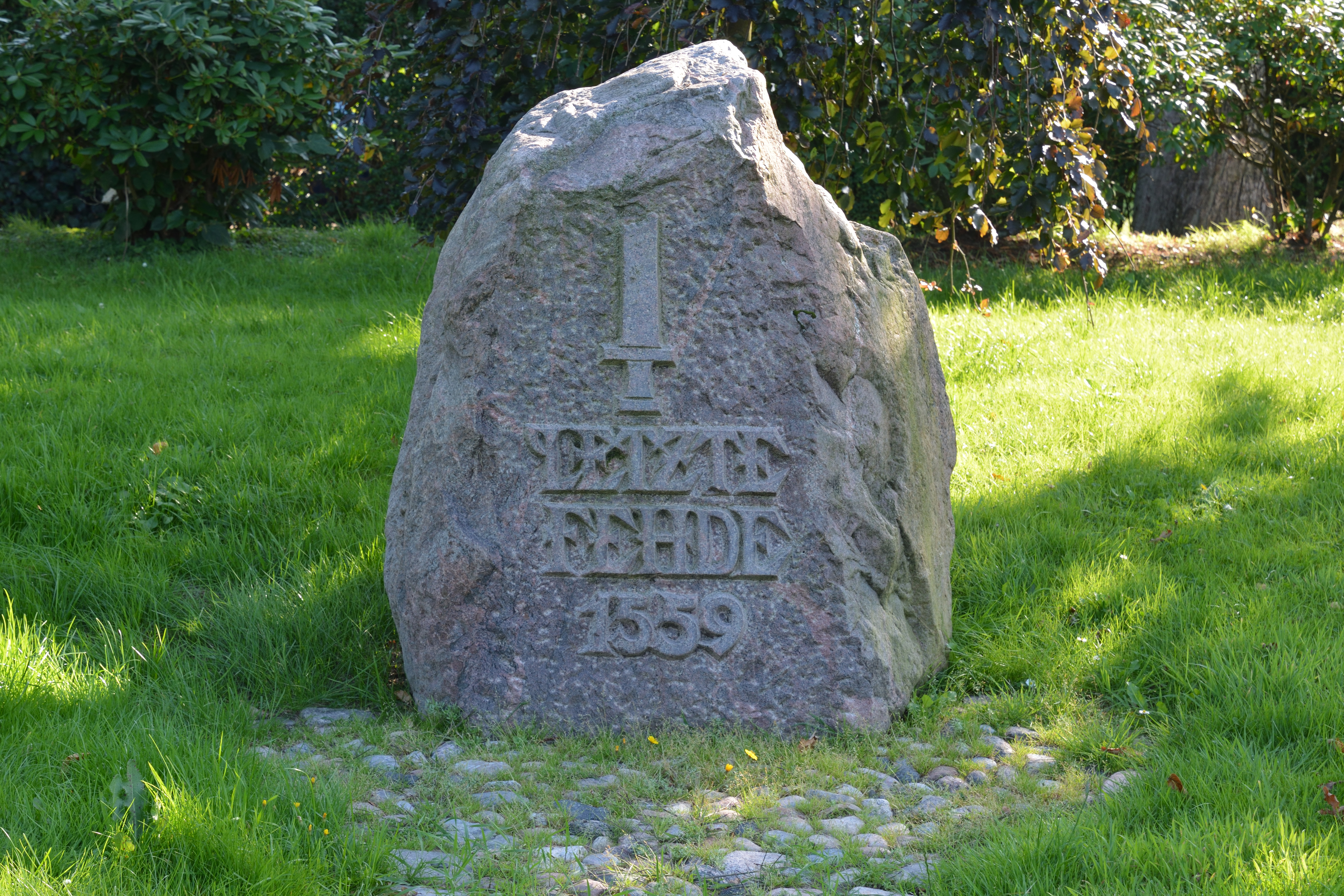
Memorial stone in Heide

Last Feud (1559) was a conflict that ended the independence of Dithmarschen, a self-governing peasant republic in what is now northern Germany. A coalition led by King Frederick II of Denmark and his uncles Duke Adolf I and Duke John the Elder, launched an invasion to bring the region under control.

The campaign was led by General Johann Rantzau, whose forces defeated the Dithmarschen militia and captured key towns, including Meldorf and Heide.
