= Chief of the Royal Danish Air Force =

Chief of the Air Command
- Chef for Flyverkommandoen

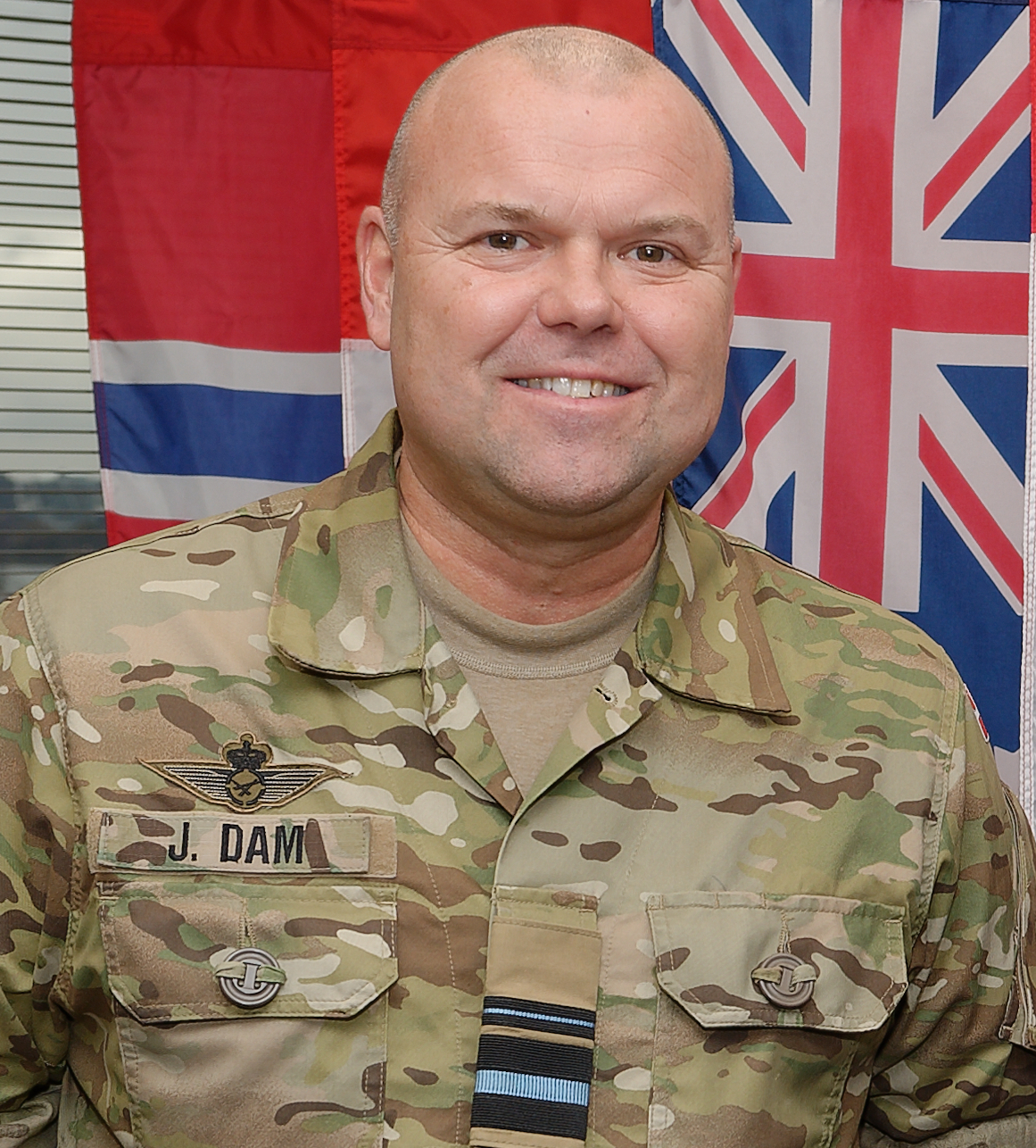
- Incumbent; Major General Jan Dam since 15 May 2021
- Royal Danish Air Force
- Member of: Defence Command of Denmark
- Reports to: Chief of Defence
- Term length: No fixed length
- Precursor: Chief of the Tactical Air Command
- Formation: February 1913 (historical); 1 October 2014 (current)
- Website: Official Website

The Chief of the Air Command is the topmost authority in the Royal Danish Air Force. It can trace its history back to the creation of the Chief for the Naval Air Service, in 1913. The current chief of the Air Force is Major general Jan Dam.

== History ==
On 14 December 1911, the Naval Air Service was established. On 25 March 1912, the Royal Danish Navy received its first airplane the Kite, in 1913 the first chief was named. In 1912, the Army Air Corps was established. The first chief was named in 1917. Following the destruction of the air forces during World War II, it was decided that the two forces should be collected under one force. From 1947 till the creation of the RDAF, Torben Ørum served as Combined Army and Naval Air Corps Chief. In 1950, the Air Command and the position of Chief of the Air Force was created. With the creation of the Defence Staff and Chief of Defence, in 1970, the Chief of the Air Force was subjugated to the CoD. In 1982, the title of Chief of the Air Force was changed to become Inspector of the Air Force. Following the 1988 Defence Commission, it was decided that the Air Staff and the positions of Inspector would be removed and then create the Tactical Air Command. Following the Danish Defence Agreement 2013–17, the Tactical Air Command was disbanded and reorganised into the Air Staff. On 1 January 2019, as part of the Danish Defence Agreement 2018–23, the Danish name was changed Air Command.

== List of chiefs ==
=== Naval Air Service (1913–1947) ===
No.	Picture	Chief for the Naval Air Service	Took office	Left office	Time in office	Ref.
1	Ulrik Birch	Ulrik Birch (1883–1913) (Note: Died in a plane crash)	February 1913	October 1913 †	8 months	
2	Axel Hoeck	First lieutenant Axel Hoeck (?–1915)	14 April 1914	27 July 1915 †	1 year, 3 months	
3	Frederik W. H. Laub	First lieutenant Frederik W. H. Laub (1887–1945)	27 July 1915	March 1918	2 years, 7 months	
4	Asger Grandjean	Commodore; Asger Grandjean (1889–1948)	March 1918	31 October 1941	23 years, 7 months	
5	Povl Scheibel	Commodore; Povl Scheibel (1893–?)	31 October 1941	1 December 1947	6 years, 1 month	

=== Army Aviation Troops (1917–1947) ===
No.	Picture	Chief for the Army Aviation Troops	Took office	Left office	Time in office	Ref.
1	Johan Peter Koch	Colonel; Johan Peter Koch (1870–1928)	1917	13 January 1928 †	10–11 years	
2	Hans Oluf Hansen	Colonel; Hans Oluf Hansen (1879–1967)	1928	1932	3–4 years	
3	Christian Førslev [da]	Colonel; Christian Førslev (1891–1959)	1 November 1932	1945	7–8 years	
4	Tage Andersen	Colonel; Tage Andersen (1899–1965)	1945	1947	1–2 years	

=== Combined Army and Naval Air Corps (1947–1950) ===
No.	Picture	Chief for the Combined Army and Naval Air Corps	Took office	Left office	Time in office	Ref.
1	Torben Ploug Aagesen Ørum	Colonel; Torben Ploug Aagesen Ørum (1901–1999)	1 December 1947	1 October 1950	2 years, 304 days	

=== Air Command (1950–1969) ===
No.	Picture	Chief of the Air Command	Took office	Left office	Time in office	Ref.
1	Christian Førslev [da]	Lieutenant general Christian Førslev (1891–1959)	1 October 1950	31 October 1955	5 years, 30 days	
2	Tage Andersen	Lieutenant general Tage Andersen (1899–1965)	1 November 1955	30 June 1959	3 years, 241 days	
3	Kurt Ramberg [da]	Lieutenant general Kurt Ramberg (1908–1997)	1 July 1959	30 September 1962	3 years, 107 days	
4	Hans Jjørgen Pagh	Lieutenant general Hans Jjørgen Pagh (1905–1997)	1 October 1962	30 April 1970	7 years, 211 days	

=== Air Staff (1970–1990) ===
No.	Picture	Chief of the Air Staff	Took office	Left office	Time in office	Ref.
Chief of the Air Force
1	Niels Holst-Sørensen	Major general Niels Holst-Sørensen (born 1922)	1 May 1970	30 June 1982	12 years	
Inspector of the Air Force
2	P. Thorsen	Major general P. Thorsen	26 May 1982	1984	1–2 years	–
3	Bent Vilhelm Larsens	Major general Bent Vilhelm Larsens (1930–2014)	1984	1990	5–6 years	

=== Tactical Air Command (1990–2014) ===
No.	Picture	Chief of Tactical Air Command	Took office	Left office	Time in office	Ref.
1	Ole Fogh [da]	Major general Ole Fogh (born 1934)	1990	1994	3–4 years	
2	Laurits Tophøj	Major general Laurits Tophøj (born 1940)	1994	1997	2–3 years	
3	Kurt Ebbe Rosgaard	Major general Kurt Ebbe Rosgaard (born 1946)	1997	2000	2–3 years	
4	Leif Simonsen [da]	Major general Leif Simonsen (born 1945)	2000	2005	4–5 years	
5	Stig Østergaard Nielsen	Major general Stig Østergaard Nielsen (born 1954)	2005	2009	3–4 years	
6	Henrik Røboe Dam	Major general Henrik Røboe Dam	2009	30 September 2014	4–5 years	

=== Air Staff (2014–2018) ===
No.	Picture	Chief of Air Staff	Took office	Left office	Time in office	Ref.
1	Max A.L.T. Nielsen [de]	Major general Max A.L.T. Nielsen (born 1963)	1 October 2014	31 October 2017	3 years, 30 days	
2	Anders Rex	Major general Anders Rex (born 1970)	1 November 2017	31 December 2018	1 year, 60 days	

=== Air Command (2019–present) ===
No.	Portrait	Name (born–died)	Term of office			Ref.
No.	Portrait	Name (born–died)	Took office	Left office	Time in office	Ref.
1		Major general Anders Rex (born 1970)	1 January 2019	1 May 2021	2 years, 120 days	
–		Major general Jan Dam (born 1964)	1 May 2021	15 May 2021	14 days	
2		Major general Jan Dam (born 1964)	15 May 2021	Incumbent	5 years, 115 days	

== See also ==
- Chief of Defence (Denmark)
- Chief of the Royal Danish Army
- Chief of the Royal Danish Navy
