= Carl Christian Jacob Førslev =

Danish military aviator

Christian Førslev
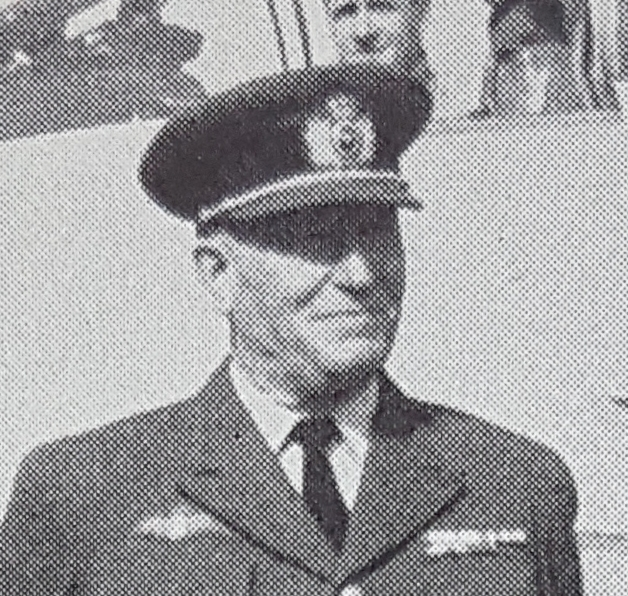

Chief of the Royal Danish Air Force
- In office 1 October 1950 – 31 October 1955
- Preceded by: Office established
- Succeeded by: Tage Andersen

Personal details
- Born: Carl Christian Jacob Førslev; 27 January 1891
- Died: Between 21 January and 31 March 1959 (aged 67–68) Furesø
- Spouses: NN (m. 1922; ann. 1930); Harriet Maybell Bertelsen (m. 1930)

Military service
- Years of service: 1914–1956
- Rank: Lieutenant general

Carl Christian Jacob Førslev (born 27 January 1891 in Sneslev, Førslev Parish, died between 21 January and 31 March 1959) was a Danish officer, married to Harriet Førslev. He was the son of Jacob Hansen and Louise Schou, the eldest of six siblings.

He commanded the Danish Army Air Corps and, from 1950, was the first Chief of the newly created Royal Danish Air Force.
