= Capture of Tranquebar (1801) =

Capture of Tranquebar by British forces in 1801

- Part of the English Wars
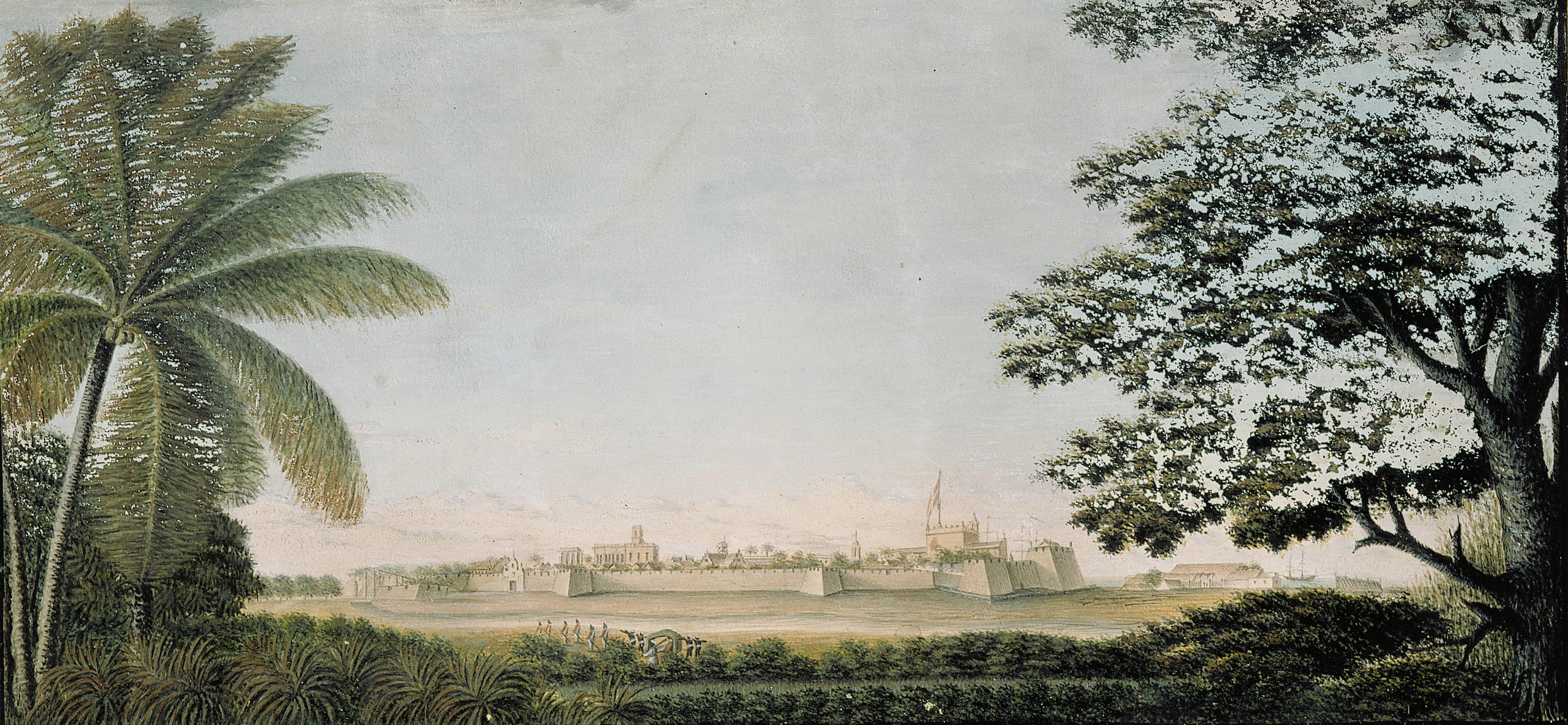
- 1790 painting of Tranquebar by Peter Anker
Date	12 May 1801
Location	Tranquebar, (modern-day Tharangambadi, India) 11°1′45″N 79°50′58″E
Result	British victory
Territorial changes	Tranquebar occupied by the British

Belligerents
United Kingdom	Denmark-Norway

Commanders and leaders
(United Kingdom of Great Britain and Ireland) Richard Wellesley	(Denmark–Norway) Peter Anker (surrendered)

Units involved
(United Kingdom of Great Britain and Ireland) HMS Braave (United Kingdom of Great Britain and Ireland) HMS Albatross	(Denmark–Norway) Dansborg garrison

Strength
2 ships 200 men 60 cannons	3 ships 76 Europeans; 300 Sepoys

Casualties and losses
Unknown	3 ships seized

The Capture of Tranquebar (Danish: Overtagelsen af Trankebar) or the Surrender of Tranquebar (Danish: Overgivelsen af Trankebar) was a British takeover of the capital of Danish India, Tranquebar. The capture was quick and successful, with the Dano-Norwegian governor, Peter Anker, surrendering with the arrival of the British.

== Background ==
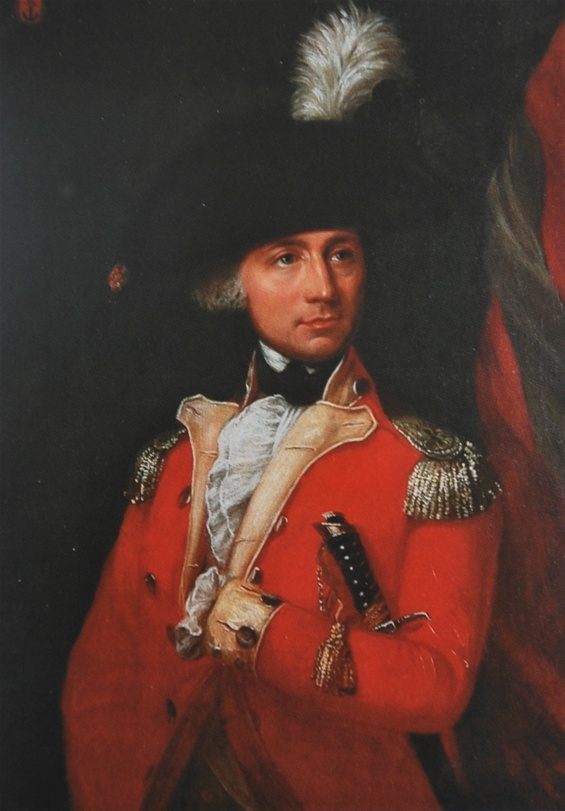
Portrait of Peter Anker (1744–1832), by Nils Gude

During the French Revolutionary Wars in 1800 and early-1801 rising tensions rose between Denmark–Norway and the United Kingdom. The Danish colony of Tranquebar subsequently received intelligence of the rising tensions between the two nations, and Danish merchants therefore sold their ships in order for them not to end up in British hands. Governor of Tranquebar, Peter Anker, realized that a defense on a hypothetical British attack would by hopeless, and he therefore had already begun preparing for a capitulation.

== Capture ==
In May 1801 the British Governor-General of India, Richard Wellesley, got orders from Britain to occupy the Danish colonies, and on the 12 May two British ships with 200 men anchored on the coast of Tranquebar. Concurrently a force from Madras marched to Tranquebar to besiege the city. According to Peter Anker, the British forces were too strong to stand a change against, especially considering the poor conditions the fortifications had. When the British encouraged Anker to surrender, he therefore quickly consented and sent his Instrument of Surrender to the British command.

On the same day, the British occupied Fort Dansborg and hoisted the Union Jack there. The three Danish ships in the harbour were seized.

== Aftermath ==
Despite the Danish instrument of surrender being favourable to the Danes, the British still accepted. According to the capitulation Danish laws were acknowledged, and all public cases would be settled by the Danes, migrants would preserve their protection and the Danish officers should have the same wages as British. Only a British inspector would be installed to keep track of the economy.

Some months after the surrender Anker received orders from Copenhagen to make the colony ready for a British attack, and to protect it to the utmost, yet Anker had already issued a surrender. On the 17 August 1802 Tranquebar was given back to Denmark-Norway.

== See also ==
- English Wars (Scandinavia) – 1807–1814 war in Northern and Western Europe
- Battle of Copenhagen (1801) – 1801 battle of the War of the Second Coalition and the English Wars
- Peter Anker
- Gunboat War – 1807–1814 war of the Napoleonic Wars
- Capture of Serampore (1801) – 1801 capture of a Danish colony in India

== Bibliography ==
- Lisberg, Bering (2020). Danmarks søfart og søhandel (in Danish). Vol. 1. SAGA Egmont. ISBN 978-87-26-30660-6.
- Petersen, Sofie (1946). Danmarks gamle Tropekolonier (in Danish). Det Kongelige danske geografiske selskab. ISBN 978-87-26-30660-6.
- Carl, Henrik (1919). Danmarks søfart og søhandel fra den aeldiste tider til vore dage (in Danish). Vol. 1. Nyt nordisk forlag. p. 566.
