= Peter Anker =

Norwegian general, diplomat and painter (1744–1832)

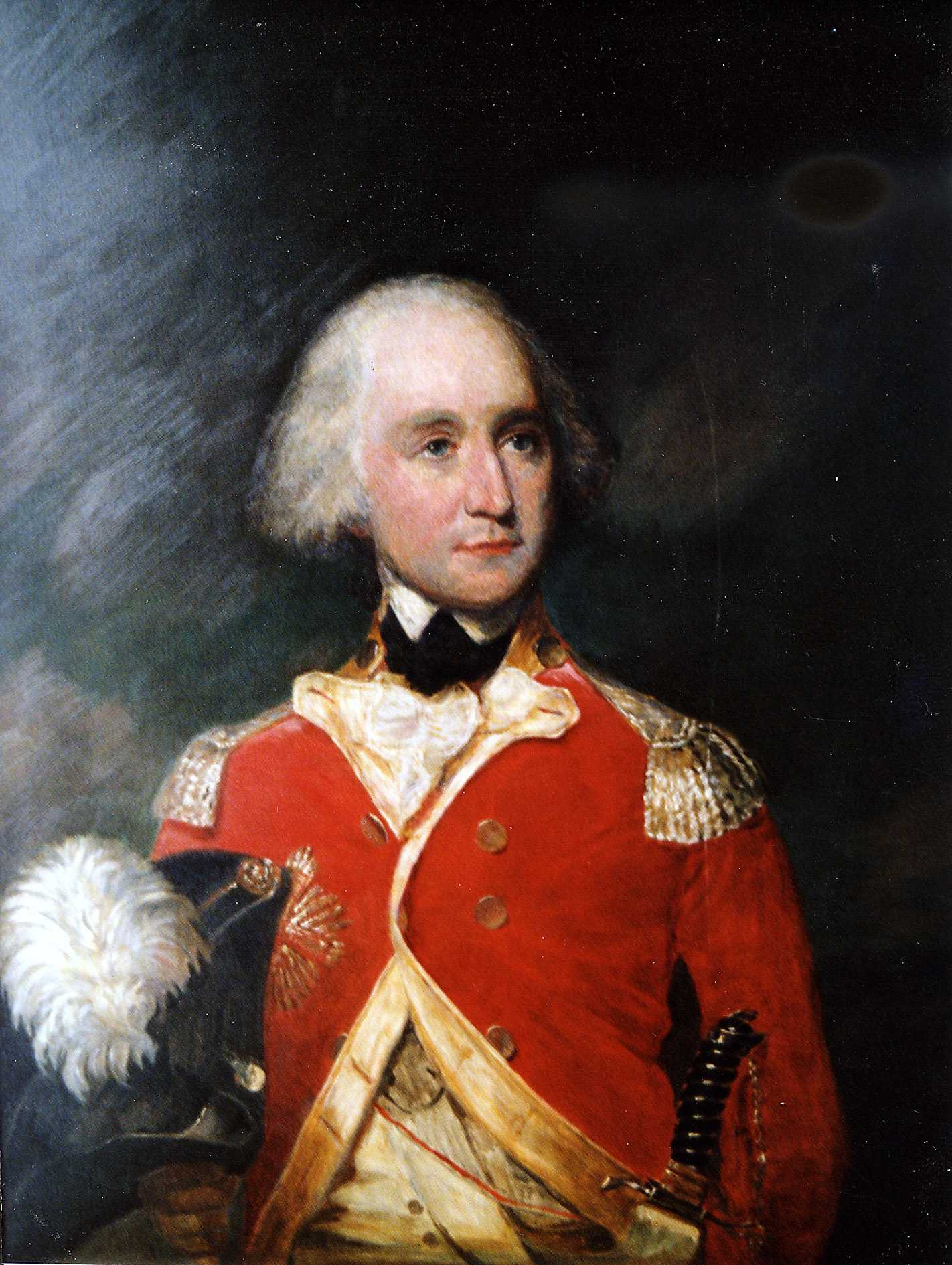
- Peter Anker in uniform from Tranquebar. Painting from 1912 by Harald Brun; a copy of an older original.

Governor of Danish India
- In office 1786–1808
- Monarch: Christian VII
- Preceded by: Hermann Abbestée

Personal details
- Born: Peter Ancher; 31 July 1744 Fredrikshald, Norway
- Died: 17 April 1832 (aged 87) Aker, Norway
- Resting place: Moss, Norway
- Relations: Carsten Anker (brother)

Peter Anker (31 July 1744 – 17 April 1832) was a Norwegian diplomat, military officer and colonial general. He served as Consul in Hull, consul general in London and later as governor for the Danish settlement of Tranquebar. He was also known for his watercolour illustrations documenting his travels and life.

== Biography ==
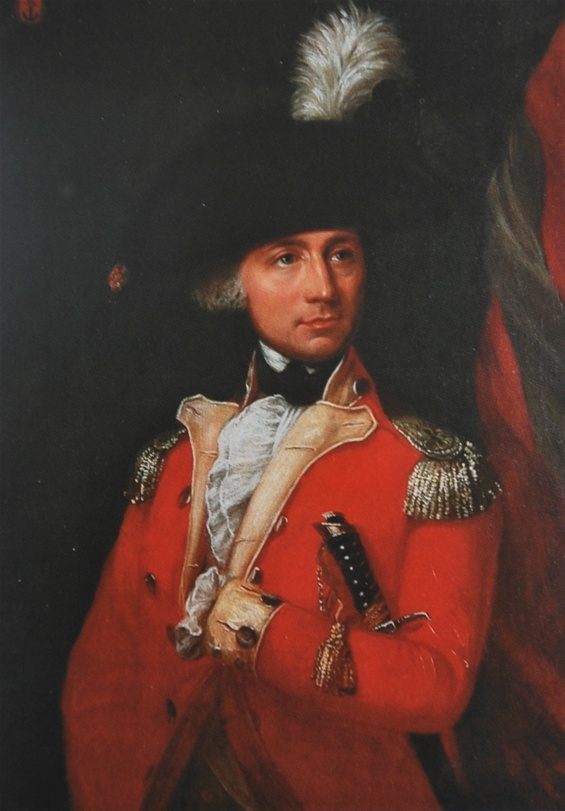
Painting by Nils Gude

Anker was born in Fredrikshald, Norway as a son of Erik Ancher (1709–1785) and Anne Catherine Tank (1723–1761). He was a brother of Carsten Tank Anker, and changed his surname from Ancher to Anker in 1778.

He held the military rank of Major General, but was best known as a colonial governor for Denmark–Norway. He was the country's consul in Kingston upon Hull from 1773 to 1776. He was a careful illustrator and his diagrams of Newcomen steam engines from England introduced the concept into Norway and Denmark. Anker was appointed Governor-general of the Danish-Norwegian colony at Tranquebar from 1786 to 1808. While there he collected local art and made a series of drawing and painting which are now in the Ethnographic Museum at the University of Oslo.

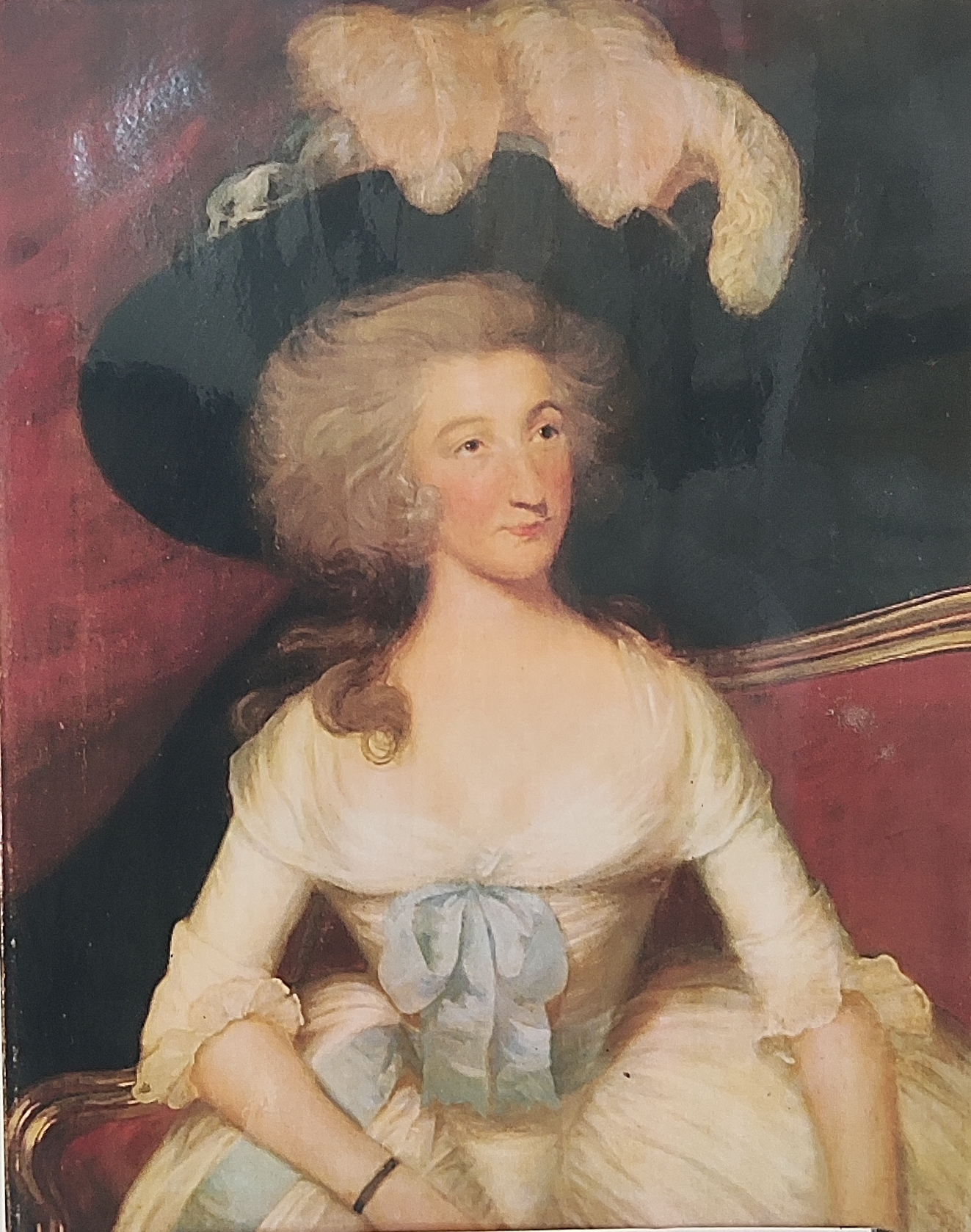
Mrs Mallard, c. 1790

Anker did not marry but lived with an English widow named Mallard who died in 1791. He had a memorial built for her.

He was appointed a knight in the Order of the Dannebrog in 1804. In 1814 he participated in the Meeting of Notables which preceded the Norwegian Constituent Assembly (however he was not a part of the Constituent Assembly).

In 1808 he settled at Øraker west of Oslo. He died in April 1832 at Aker (now Oslo) and was buried in Moss. He had a cenotaph, a copy of the memorial built for Mrs Mallard at his farm in Øraker and had wished that he should be buried with his face covered by a red kerchief that Mallard had given him.

== Watercolors by Peter Anker ==
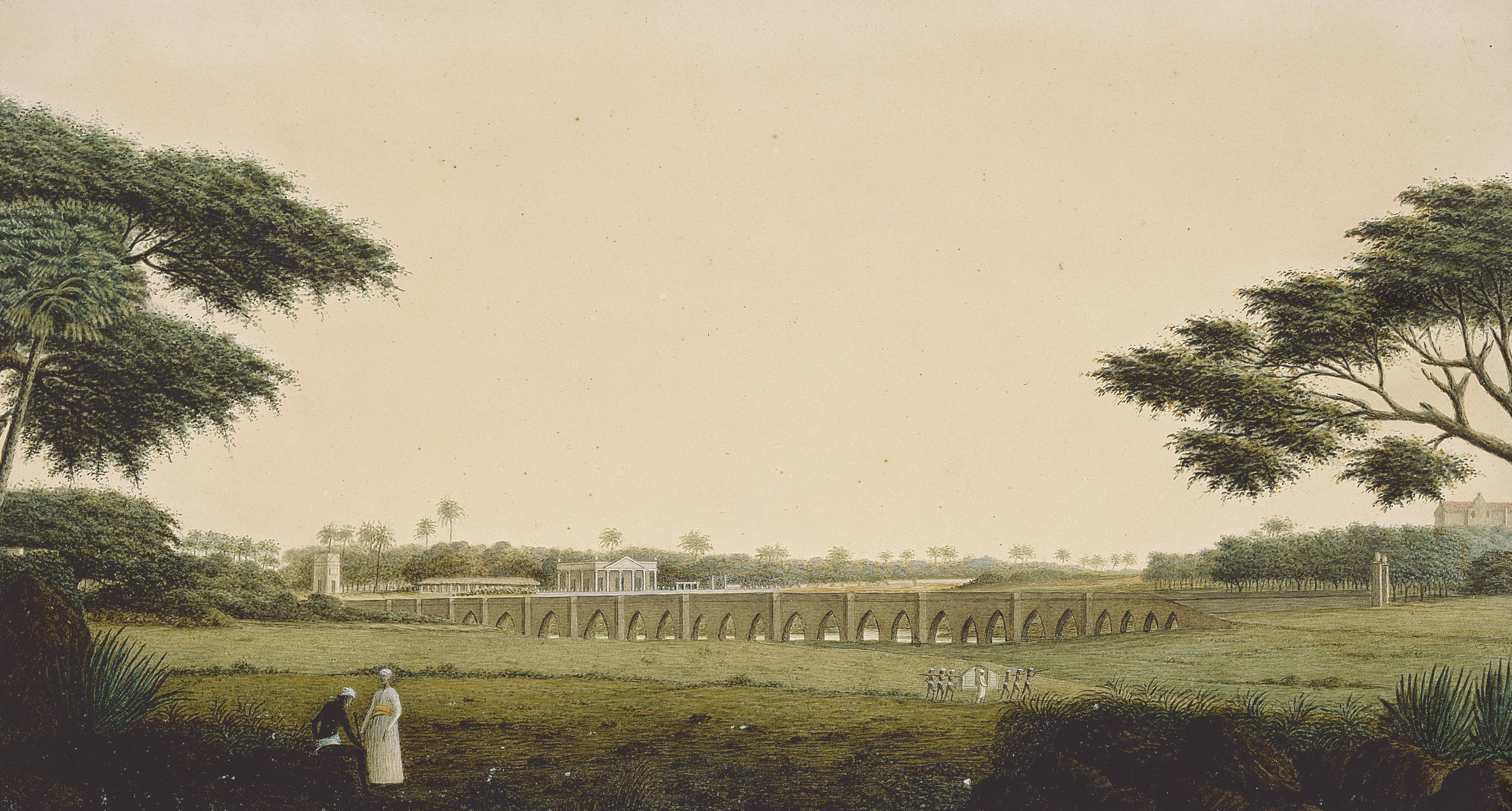
Mambalam bridge, Madras

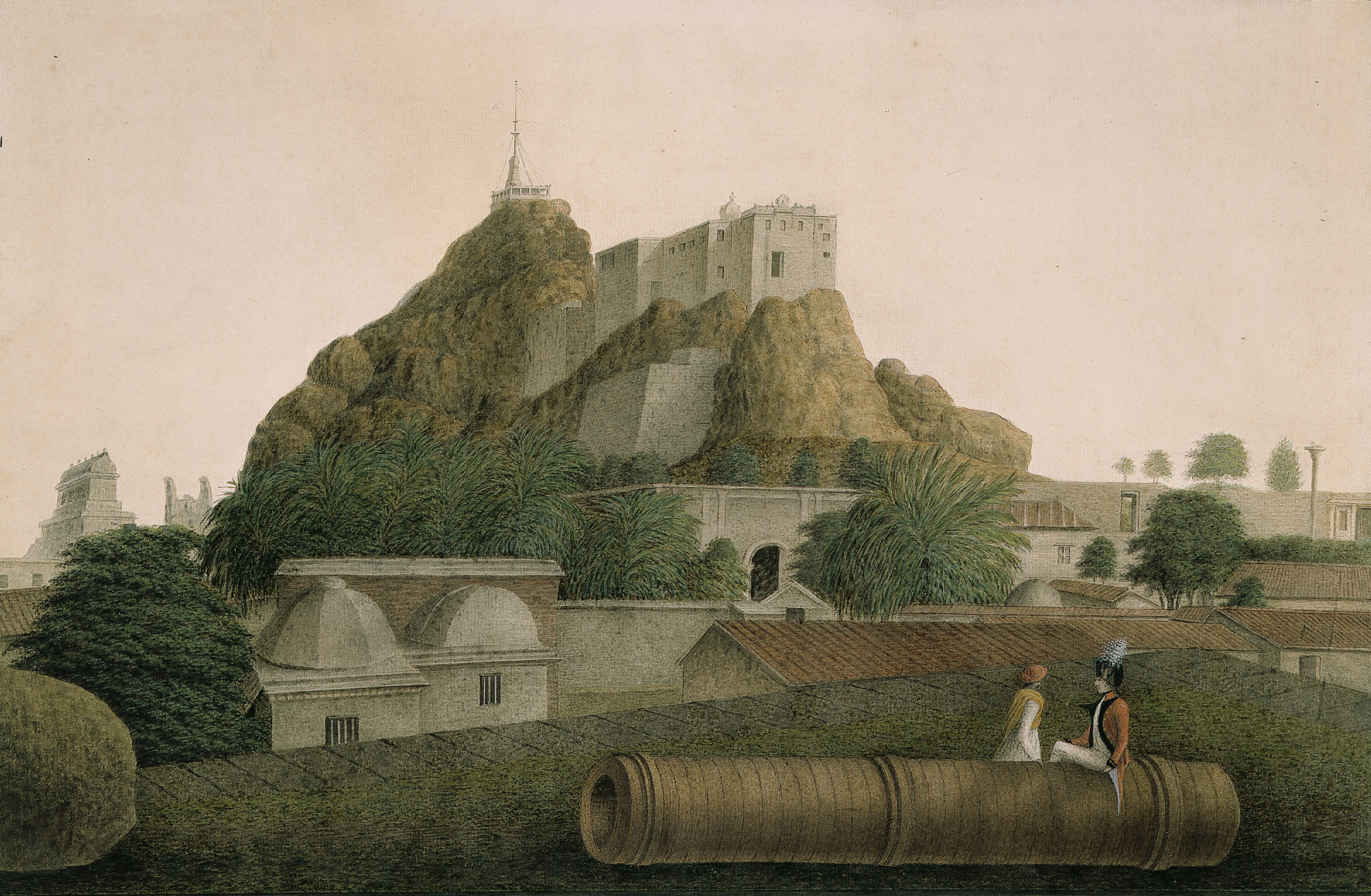
Trichinopoly

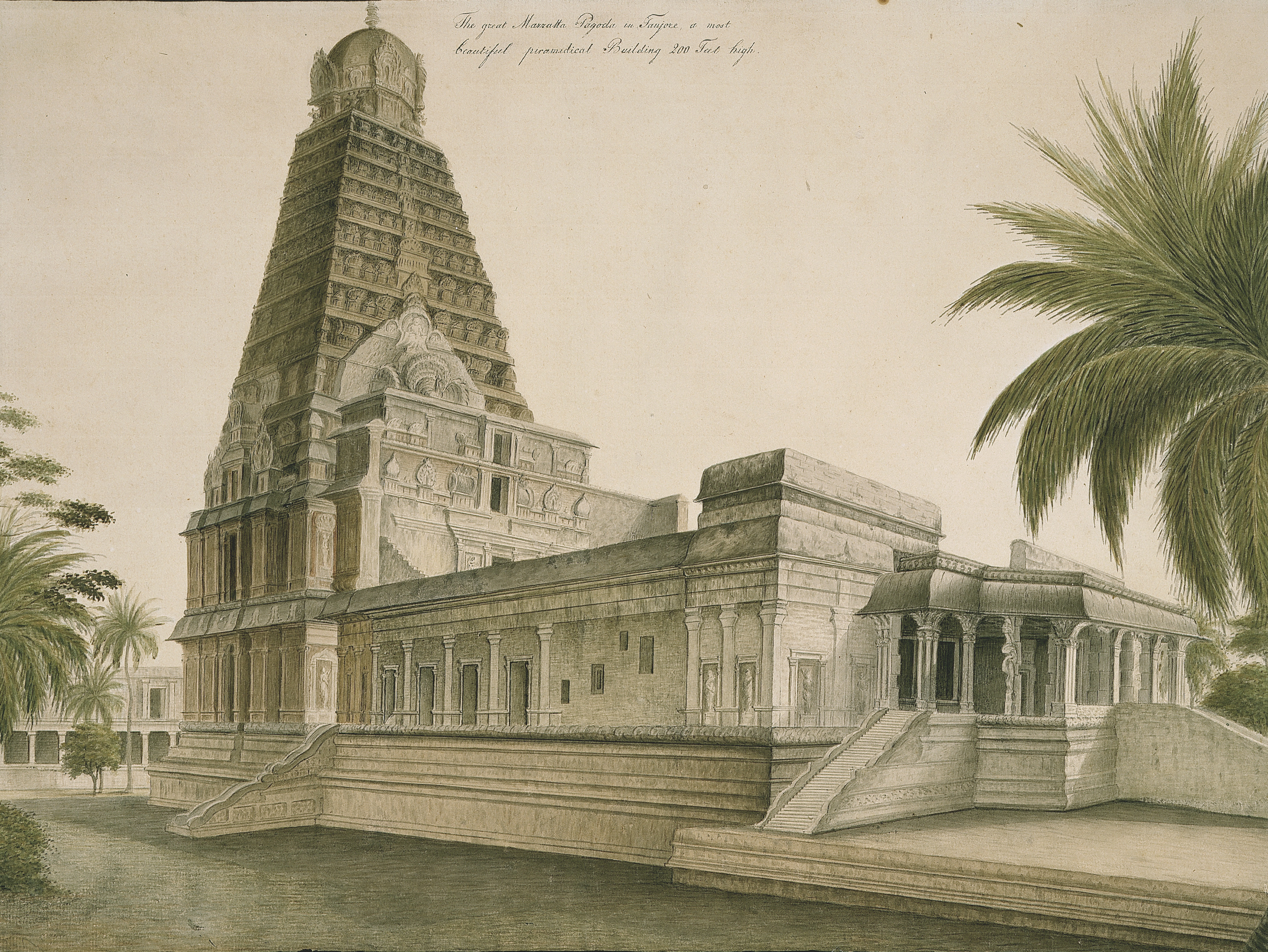
The Tanjore temple

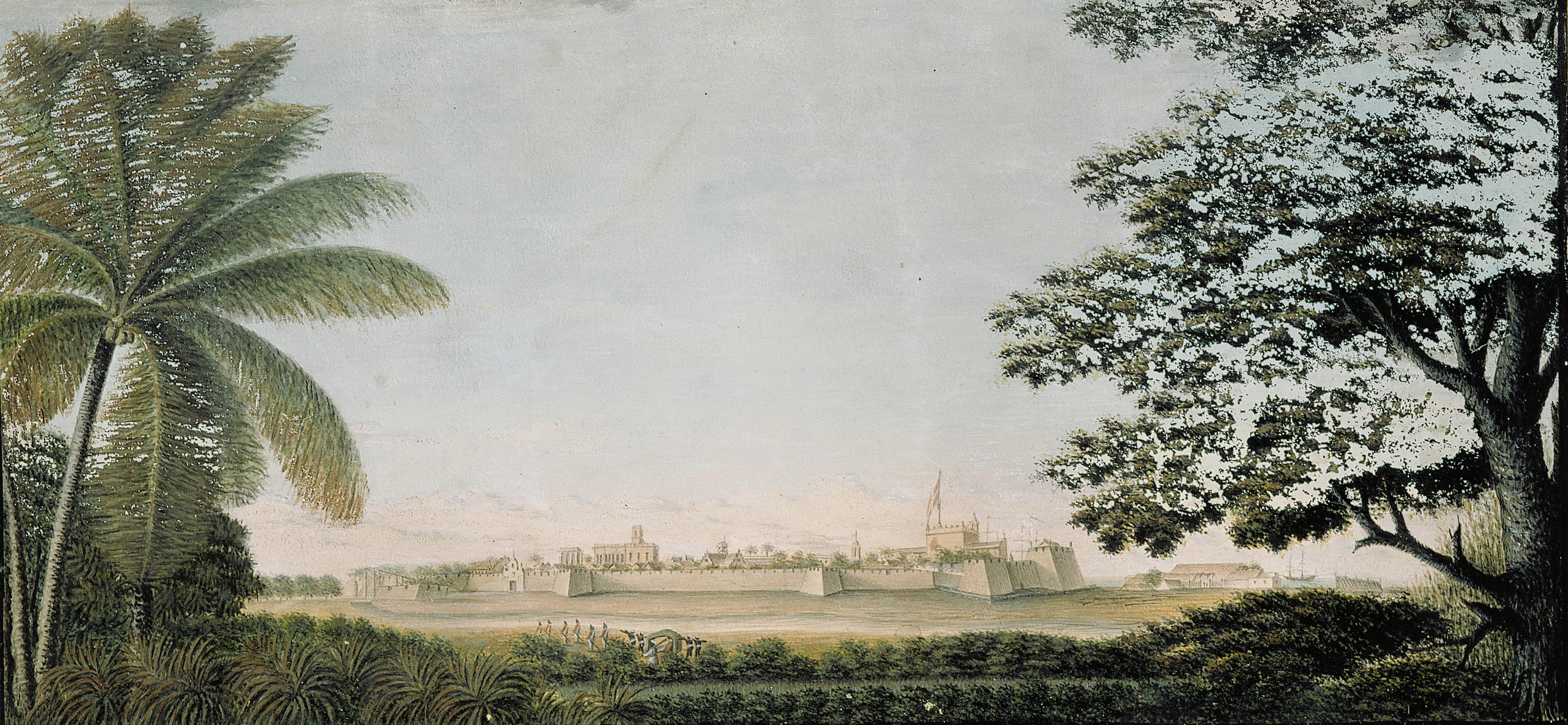
View of Tranquebar in 1790

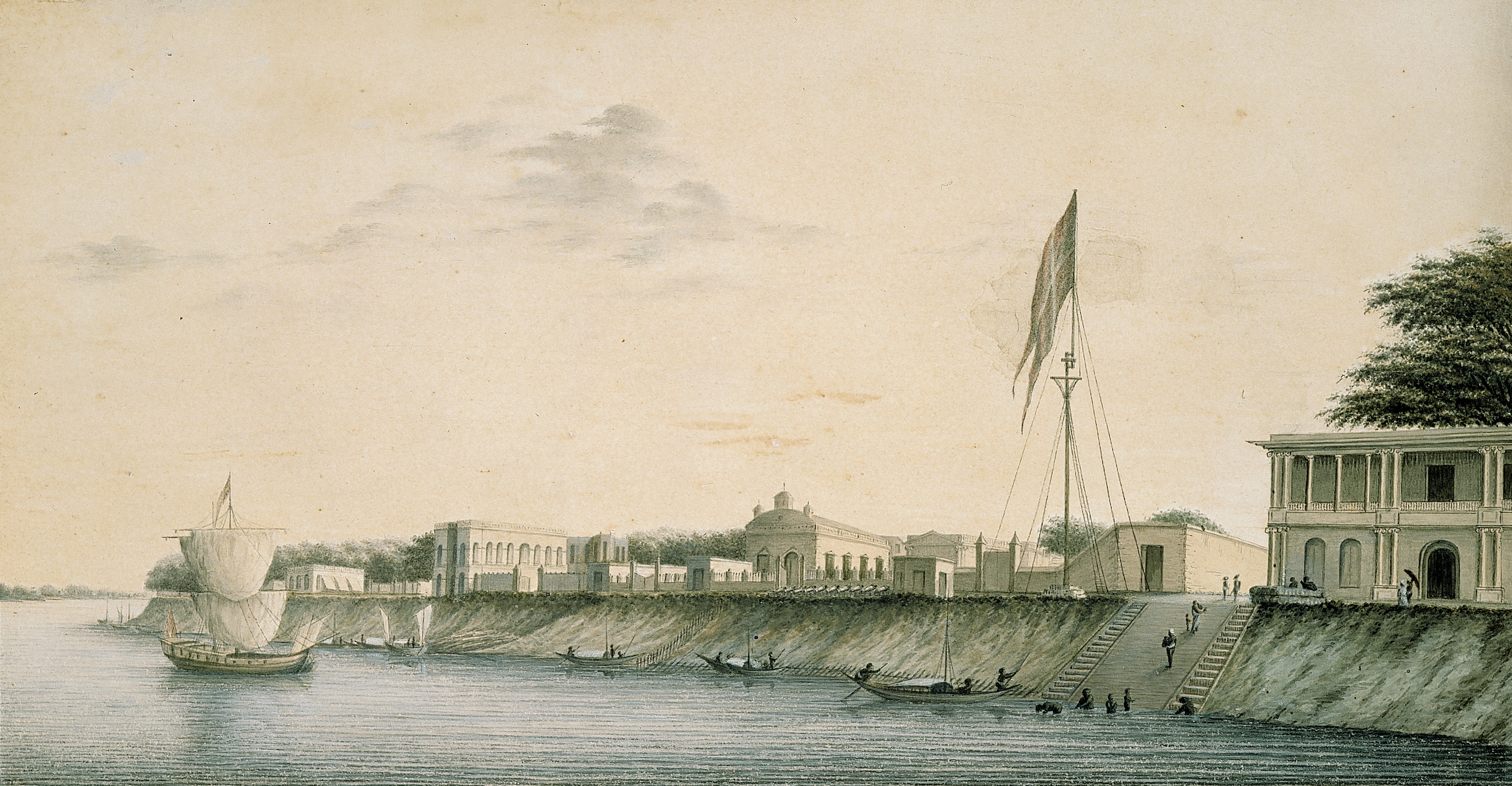
View of Friedriksnagore, 1790
