= English Wars (Scandinavia) =

1807–1814 war in Northern and Western Europe

- Part of the French Revolutionary Wars and the Napoleonic Wars
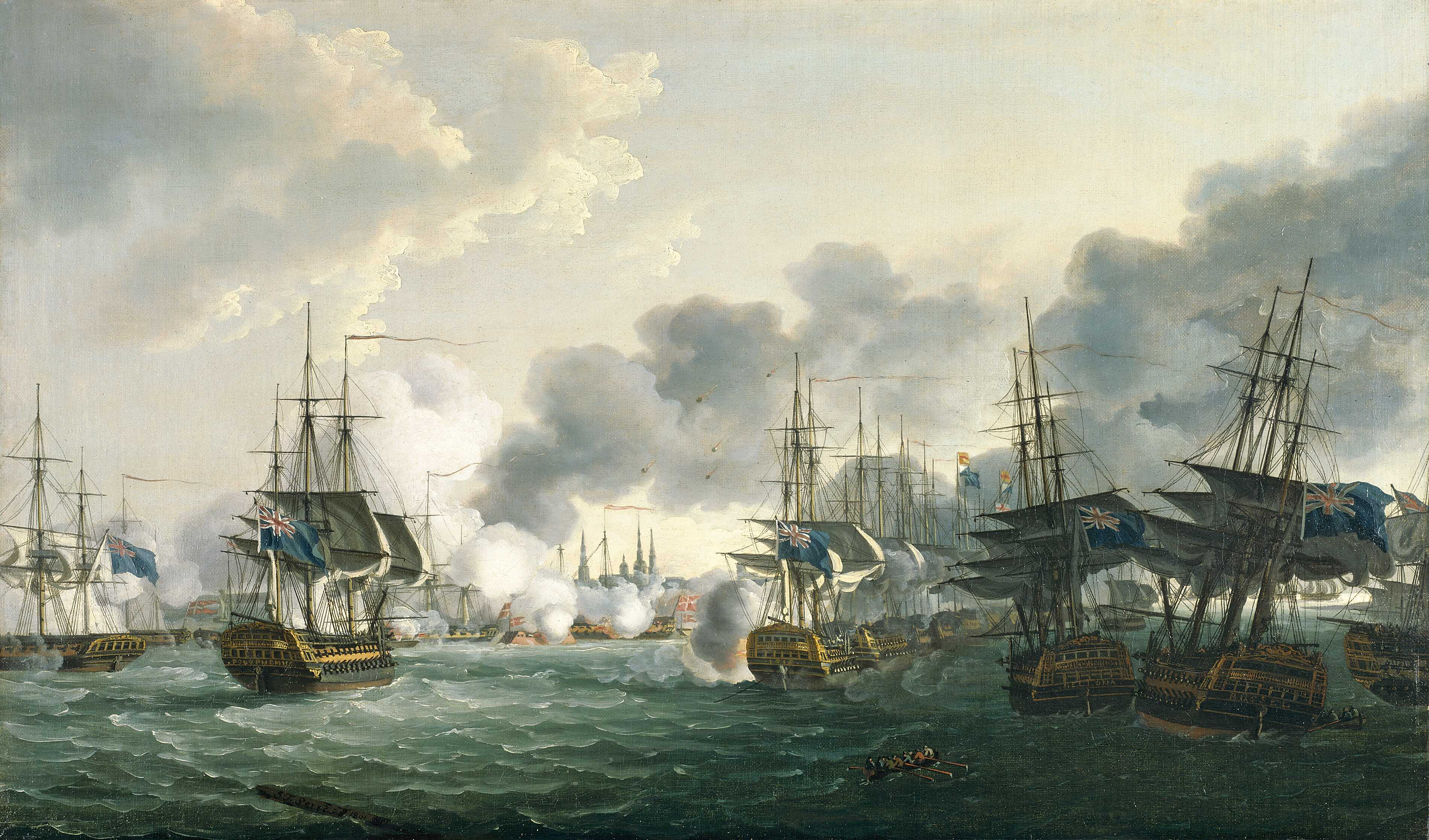
- The Battle of Copenhagen, 2 April 1801; John Thomas Serres, 1801
Date	1801, 1807–1814
Location	Denmark–Norway; Sweden; Germany
Result	Anglo-Swedish victory: Treaty of Kiel; Denmark joined the anti-Napoleonic alliance; Frederick VI of Denmark cedes Norway to Sweden
Territorial changes	Norway ceded to the King of Sweden; Heligoland ceded to United Kingdom; Swedish Pomerania ceded to Denmark

Belligerents
Denmark–Norway; Supported by: French Empire; Spain^{[a]}	United Kingdom; Supported by: Sweden^{[b]}

Commanders and leaders
(Denmark–Norway) Christian VII; (Denmark–Norway) Frederick VI; (Denmark–Norway) Ernst Peymann; (Denmark–Norway) Christian August; (First French Empire) Jean-Baptiste Bernadotte^{[d]}	(United Kingdom of Great Britain and Ireland) William Cavendish-Bentinck; (United Kingdom of Great Britain and Ireland) Spencer Perceval; (United Kingdom of Great Britain and Ireland) Robert Jenkinson; (United Kingdom of Great Britain and Ireland) William Cathcart; (United Kingdom of Great Britain and Ireland) Arthur Wellesley; (United Kingdom of Great Britain and Ireland) Hyde Parker; (United Kingdom of Great Britain and Ireland) Horatio Nelson; (United Kingdom of Great Britain and Ireland) James Gambier; (Sweden) Gustav IV Adolf^{[c]}; (Sweden) Charles XIII^{[c]}; (Sweden) Crown Prince Charles John^{[d]}
- 1. Spain was allied with France until the outbreak of the Peninsular War in 1808.; 2. Sweden first entered the war in 1808 following a declaration of war from Denmark-Norway.; 3. Gustav IV Adolf was deposed by a coup d'etat on 9 March 1809, and Charles XIII was appointed king.; 4. Jean-Baptiste Bernadotte was originally in French service, but was in 1810 elected crown prince of Sweden. He therefore changed sides in the war after Sweden declared war on France in 1812.

The English Wars (Danish: Englandskrigene, Swedish: Englandskrigen) were a series of conflicts pitting the United Kingdom and Sweden against Denmark–Norway as part of the Napoleonic Wars. It is named after England, the common name in Scandinavia for the United Kingdom, which declared war on Denmark–Norway due to disagreements over the neutrality of Danish trade and to prevent the Danish fleet falling into the hands of the First French Empire. It began with the Battle of Copenhagen (1801) and its latter stage from 1807 onwards was followed by the Gunboat War, the Dano-Swedish War of 1808–09 and the Swedish invasion of Holstein in 1814.

== Prelude ==
After the death of Denmark–Norway's foreign minister Andreas Peter Bernstorff in 1797, Crown Prince Frederick began exerting his will in all areas. This meant that the finance minister Ernst Heinrich von Schimmelmann ignored protests from the foreign minister Christian Bernstoff to finally grant the Dutch-born merchant Frédéric de Coninck's repeated requests for a naval convoy to accompany 40 merchantmen. This convoy transported mainly French and Dutch products from the Dutch East Indies to Copenhagen. This led to an 'armed neutrality' and though it gave mixed signals to the rest of the world as to that neutrality Denmark–Norway continued to insist on the inviolability of ships sailing under neutral flags. Several other such convoys set out the following day and these were given orders to resist if foreign naval ships attempted to examine the papers or cargoes in ships under the Danish flag, whatever the size of the force the convoy was faced with. This was a high-risk strategy since many non-Danish ships were sailing under the Danish flag to gain their neutrality benefits, and though the policy proved profitable in its first year it also drew diplomatic protests from Great Britain.

In December 1799 an English sailor attempting to check a Danish-flagged ship at Gibraltar was killed. When in 1800 it appeared that Russia would head a new League of Armed Neutrality Great Britain reacted, in summer that year having a squadron of 130 guns try to inspect a Danish convoy escorted by the 40-gun frigate Freya at Ostend. In accordance with his orders the captain of the Freya refused and gave battle, but was forced to strike its flag after an hour. This led to Denmark–Norway asking Russia to join the Armed Neutrality, though in August a British fleet arrived off Copenhagen. Under threat of a British bombardment Christian Bernstorff promised to stop convoys temporarily while Denmark and Great Britain set up common rules on how and when convoys were to be used.

The following month a Russian ambassador arrived in Denmark with a formal invitation for the country to join the League of Armed Neutrality together with Sweden, Russia and Prussia (headed by Tsar Paul I of Russia) which it did in December 1800. However, in 1801 the tsar signed an alliance with France, and Russia and France then forced through the closure of all European ports to British trade, leading the United Kingdom to demand that Denmark–Norway immediately leave the League. However, such a departure would make Denmark–Norway appear to ally itself with the United Kingdom and thus almost certainly lead to its being invaded by one of France or Russia's allies (Sweden had an eye to gaining Norway from Denmark and, if Prussia could conquer Jutland at the same time, British access to the Baltic Sea could be completely cut off). Denmark–Norway, believing it would be able to conduct a naval war with Britain far more successfully than a land war with Prussia, Russia and Sweden, rejected all British proposals for negotiations. The United Kingdom thus sent a fleet against Denmark on 12 March 1801 to remove Denmark–Norway from the League via a military action.

== Course ==
=== Copenhagen (1801) ===
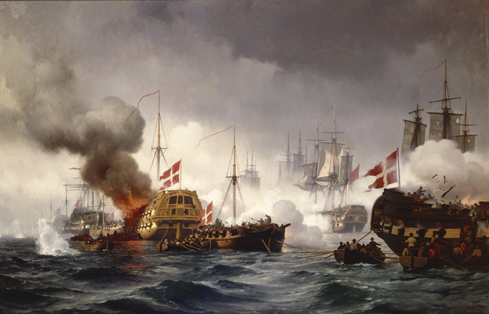
The Danish ships of the line, Kronborg and Dannebrog, in battle.

The Danes had begun to prepare for a possible attack from the British, but much of the fleet was, in late March, not ready after the winter and would take up to six weeks to make it ready. So the Danish defense plan was that the ships available should protect the entrance to Copenhagen by lying anchored in the curved line from Trekroner Fort to Amager. Command was given to Olfert Fischer, who placed himself in the middle of the formation, with his ship Dannebrog. Crew was lacking on various ships so additional crew was acquired by offering 15 "rigsdaler" in wages, followed by a quick training in how to use a cannon and an order to fight bravely for "king and country".

The British fleet passed Kronborg unimpeded on 30 March and continued towards Copenhagen along the Swedish coast. Crown Prince Frederick had, out of fear that the Swedes would be exempted from the Sound Dues, refused offers of help from them for the upcoming battle. The Swedish Navy was still, at the initiative of King Gustav IV Adolf, on their way to help the Danes, but was impeded bad weather. By midday the British fleet had anchored at Taarbæk reef. Admiral Sir Hyde Parker's plan was that half of his fleet would attack the Danish fleet from the south, while the rest would engage the Danish blockade in Kronløbet. The attack was then to be concluded by an attack on the island of Trekroner. In the following days the British prepared to attack, and they sailed further south, past Copenhagen, to avoid the Danish land batteries at Sixtus, Quintus and Trekroner.

Lord Horatio Nelson had been given command of twelve of the British ships of the line, and had the task of getting them through the tight defense that surrounded Copenhagen's reef, which was already extremely difficult to navigate through. He nevertheless took the initiative to attack, and four of his largest ships (Elephant, Defiance, Russell and Bellona) quickly became grounded. The battle lasted long and after four hours of intense fighting it was not yet decided who would win. Parker, who was with the rest of the fleet, 200 meters from the Danish line of defense, was fired upon from the cannons at Trekroner Fort, and signaled to Nelson that he should withdraw the fleet. Nelson, however, was determined to win the battle and ignored the order. Nelson had noticed that many of the Danish ships that had hoisted white flag of surrender, were still firing. Because of this, Nelson sent a curiae with a letter to Crown Prince Frederick in which he argued that he could not account for the remaining crew on board Danish ships if they continued the fight after they had surrendered. Crown Prince Frederick could from his position at the port see that the battle no longer had any purpose and agreed to a truce without consulting the Danish-Norwegian commanders, Olfert Fischer and Steen Bille.

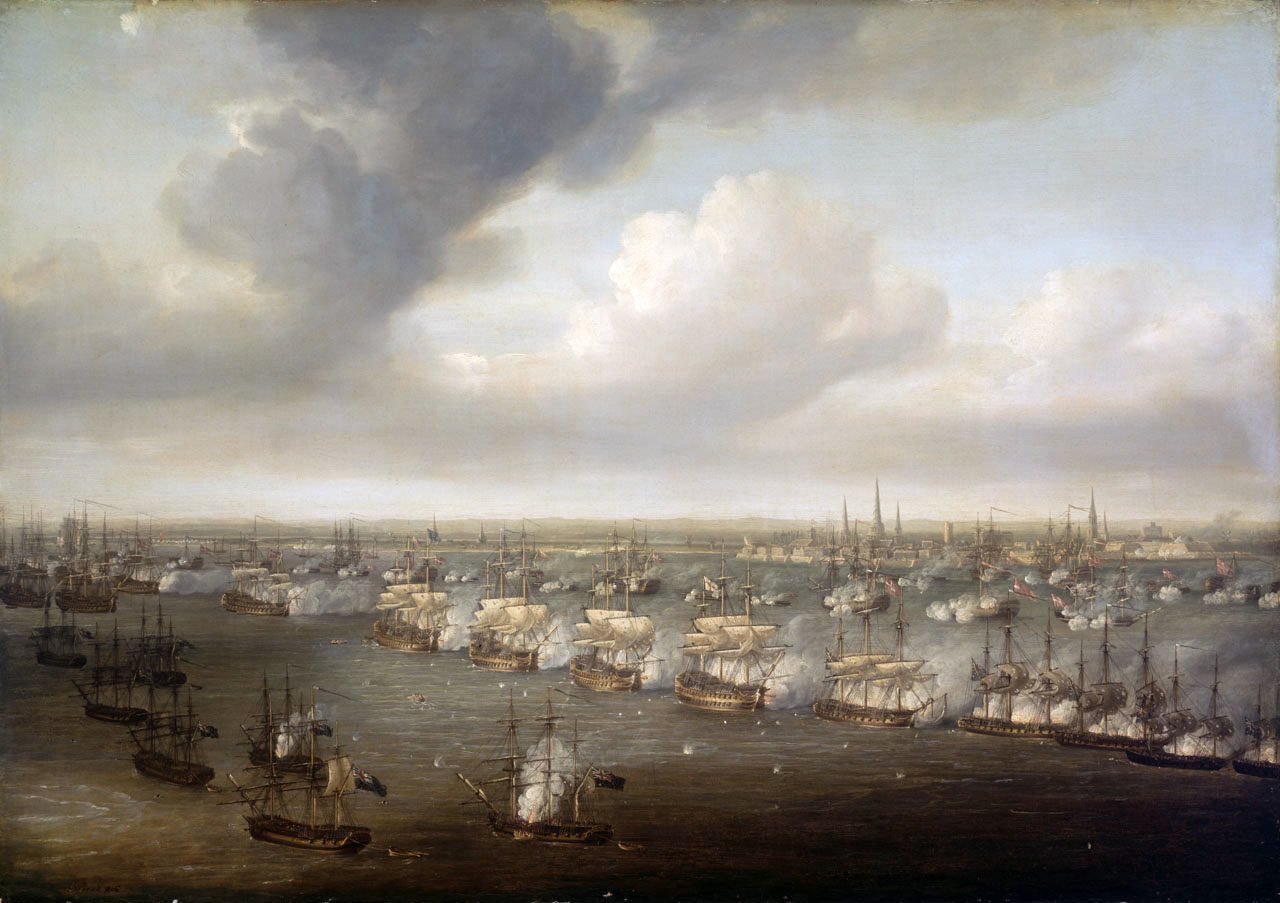
Battle of Copenhagen (1801)

==== Aftermath ====
While the British fleet were heading to Denmark the political situation changed drastically. On 21 March the British had entered into peace negotiations with France, and on 24 March, they had sent diplomats to Russia in order to clear the way for a political understanding. The British did not know that shortly afterwards the tsar was to be assassinated, and his son Alexander would take over the throne. Tsar Alexander would also prove to be much more interested in improving diplomatic relations with the British than his father had been. Due to the death of Tsar Paul, the League of Armed Neutrality was to be dissolved.

The Swedish King, Gustav IV Adolf, chose to look at Denmark–Norway's truce with Britain as treason against the League of Armed Neutrality, and exploited this by playing on Denmark–Norway's weak position in St. Petersburg. The reason for this was because Sweden in fact had great expectations about acquiring Norway from Denmark. The plans still had to be abandoned because of the lack of support from any of the other major powers in Europe.

Prussia, who Denmark–Norway had contributed to push into the League of Armed Neutrality, had withdrawn from the league as soon as the news of Tsar Paul's assassination reached Berlin. At the same time Prussia now demanded that Denmark–Norway should cede Hamburg, while Prussia kept both Hanover and Saxe-Lauenburg. Denmark–Norway, who had been forced to accept several bitter diplomatic defeats due to their neutrality policy, now turned to Britain through direct negotiations with Lord Hawkesbury. Christian Bernstorff had in late May traveled to London in order to negotiate the return of the parts of the Danish-Norwegian fleet that had been captured by the British during the Battle of Copenhagen. At the same time, Bernstorff also negotiated regarding a possible British withdrawal from the Danish-Norwegian colonies they had occupied during the short conflict. But the negotiations between Denmark–Norway and the United Kingdom would prove to be useless since Denmark had neither anything to offer nor anything to threaten the United Kingdom with.

=== Interval ===
Although Denmark–Norway had to give up parts of its neutral policy after the defeat in 1801, the country could continue its trade with both Britain and France until the war broke out again between the two countries in May 1803. The war led to further hostilities between France and the Austrian Empire, and after Napoleon's victory over Austrian and Russian troops at Austerlitz on 2 December 1805, the French ruled over most of Central Europe. During the summer of 1806 war also broke out between France and Prussia, and French forces began to advance rapidly towards Denmark's borders after the decisive victory over Prussia at Jena, on 14 October 1806.

Denmark was now forced to react and Crown Prince Frederick stationed the majority of his army in Holstein, both as a proof that he did not want to participate in the hostilities in northern Germany and as protection in case of a French invasion. But it would gradually get worse for Denmark–Norway to maintain its neutrality, and especially after Napoleon's final defeat of Prussia in the autumn of 1806, when the French emperor on 21 November that year declared the founding of the Continental System against the United Kingdom. This blockade that would close the entire European continent from trading with Britain, led the United Kingdom, as a reaction, to declare prohibition of neutral ships to trade with France and its allies.

After the Treaties of Tilsit on 7 July 1807 Russia also joined the Continental System, as well as France, and Russia agreed to force the other neutral European countries to join the blockade. When this became known, the British government decided to issue Denmark–Norway an ultimatum: Denmark should either join the British alliance, and place its fleet under British command, or disclose the fleet as collateral for its continued neutrality. The reason for this ultimatum was the existing of suspicions that Denmark would incorporate its fleet with the French, or the fear that the French would secure the Danish fleet through military means. For Crown Prince Frederick, the British demands were unrealistic, because if Denmark allied itself with Britain the country would be attacked by France, and the possibilities for Swedish and British forces to be able to help Denmark in defending the country was minimal.

=== Copenhagen (1807) ===
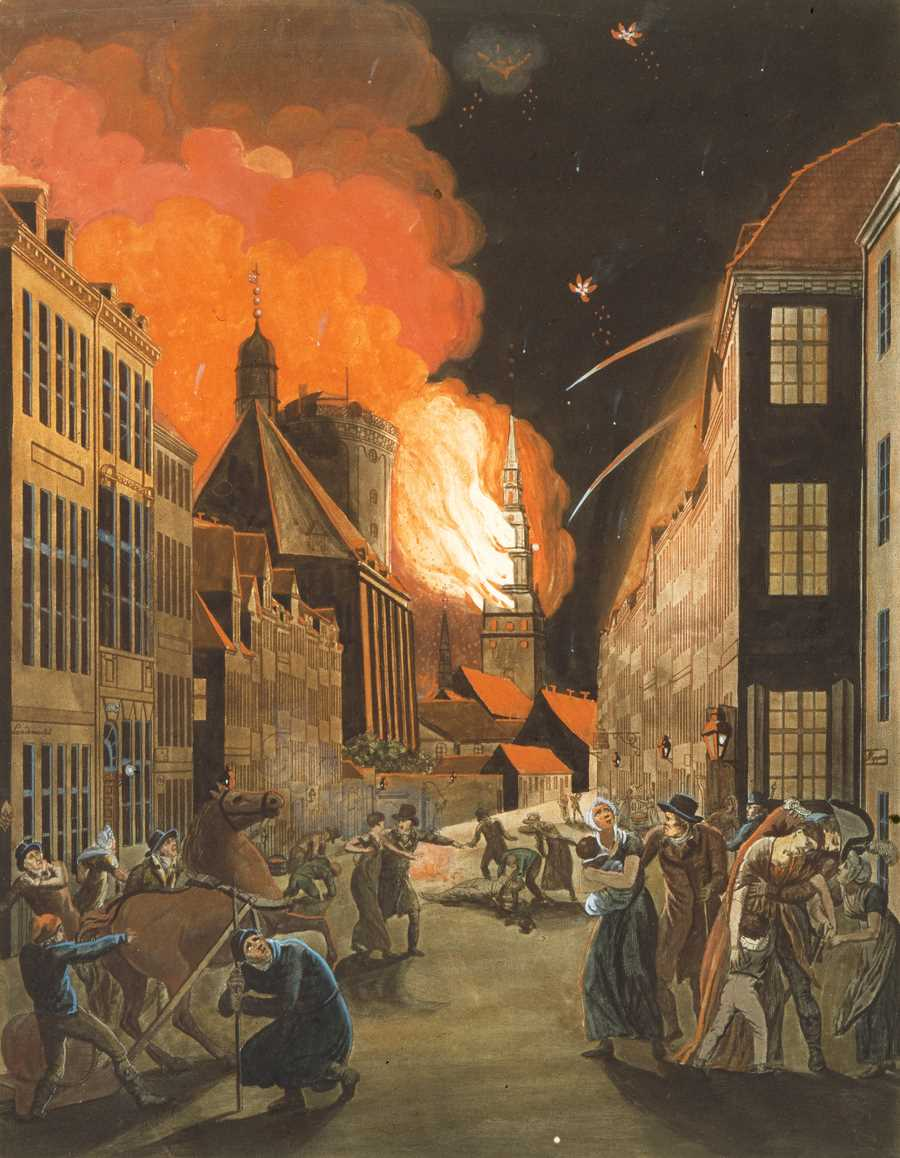
Copenhagen on fire

Since Denmark–Norway refused to accept the British ultimatum, Britain chose to land a major force in Zealand at Vedbæk on 16 August 1807 without any formal declaration of war, and since King Christian VII and Crown Prince Frederick were in Holstein with the majority of the Danish army, the newly appointed commander Ernst Peymann had to face the British landing force with an inferior number of untrained militia. The British quickly initiated the siege of Copenhagen and minor skirmishes occurred south of the capital. On 29 August, a large force of the Danish Militia were also defeated at Køge by British forces under the command of Sir Arthur Wellesley.

Since any attempt to defeat the British land forces failed and since the Danish fleet were not ready for battle, the Danes prepared for a British assault on the capital. But the attack never came, because instead of attacking Copenhagen the British began to bombard the city. The bombardment lasted from 2–6 September, and saw the deployment of Congreve rockets to bombard Copenhagen. After the bombardment on 6 September Peymann gave up and surrendered the city unconditionally to the British, this decision resulted in that he was sentenced to death, but later pardoned.

The British now captured all the Danish ships that they could take back to England, while they burnt the rest, and took everything of value on the Danish naval base at Holmen. An offer of a British-Danish alliance was also given to Crown Prince Frederick after the attack on Copenhagen, but this was rejected, as France had already set an ultimatum to either join the Continental System, or prepare for war.

In December, the British Navy also seized the Danish West Indies and occupied them for nearly eight years. The settlements of Danish India was also occupied by Britain, from 1808-1815.

=== Alliance with France ===
The British attack on Copenhagen resulted in Denmark–Norway deciding to form an alliance with France, and on 31 October, the French-Danish alliance was signed at Fontainebleau. Denmark–Norway was now officially at war with Britain, which led to the British occupation of all the Danish colonies. At the same time, the British also initiated a blockade of shipping between Denmark and Norway, which led to supply shortages in Norway which were compounded by the suspension of the Pomor trade with Russia.

Since Sweden had been an ally of Britain in the war against France since 1805, and since Russia after the peace treaty with France at Tilsit had formed an alliance with Napoleon, Tsar Alexander saw this as an opportunity to attack and take Finland from Sweden. So in February 1808 the Russians initiated the Finnish War by marching with 24,000 men into Finland and occupying Hämeenlinna. After the Russian attack on Sweden, Crown Prince Frederick also saw an opportunity to take advantage of Sweden's weak position and to take back the areas that Denmark–Norway had lost to Sweden after the Treaty of Brömsebro and the Treaty of Roskilde. Denmark had also through the agreement at Fontainebleau promised to help the French and the Russians in a possible attack against Sweden, so on 14 March 1808, one day after the death of King Christian VII, Denmark–Norway also declared war on Sweden. As a result of this declaration of war, Napoleon had chosen to send an auxiliary corps, consisting of troops from France, Spain and the Netherlands, to Denmark. The troops were led by the French Marshal Jean-Baptiste Bernadotte, and should along with the Danish-Norwegian troops have launched an invasion of Skåne. But Bernadotte's troops never got further than Zealand since the ice began to break up in the straits between Kattegat and the Baltic Sea as early as in mid-March, and the appearance of the British fleet made it difficult to cross over to Sweden. Bernadotte's troops then had to be accommodated in Kolding, where they also started the fire at Koldinghus. With Bernadotte's troops stranded on Jutland, the war was instead directed towards the Swedish-Norwegian border, where the Swedish troops in mid-April invaded Norway. The invasion was, however, halted and there were during the spring and summer only local skirmishes between the Norwegian and Swedish forces, before the Swedish troops in the late summer retreated back across the border.

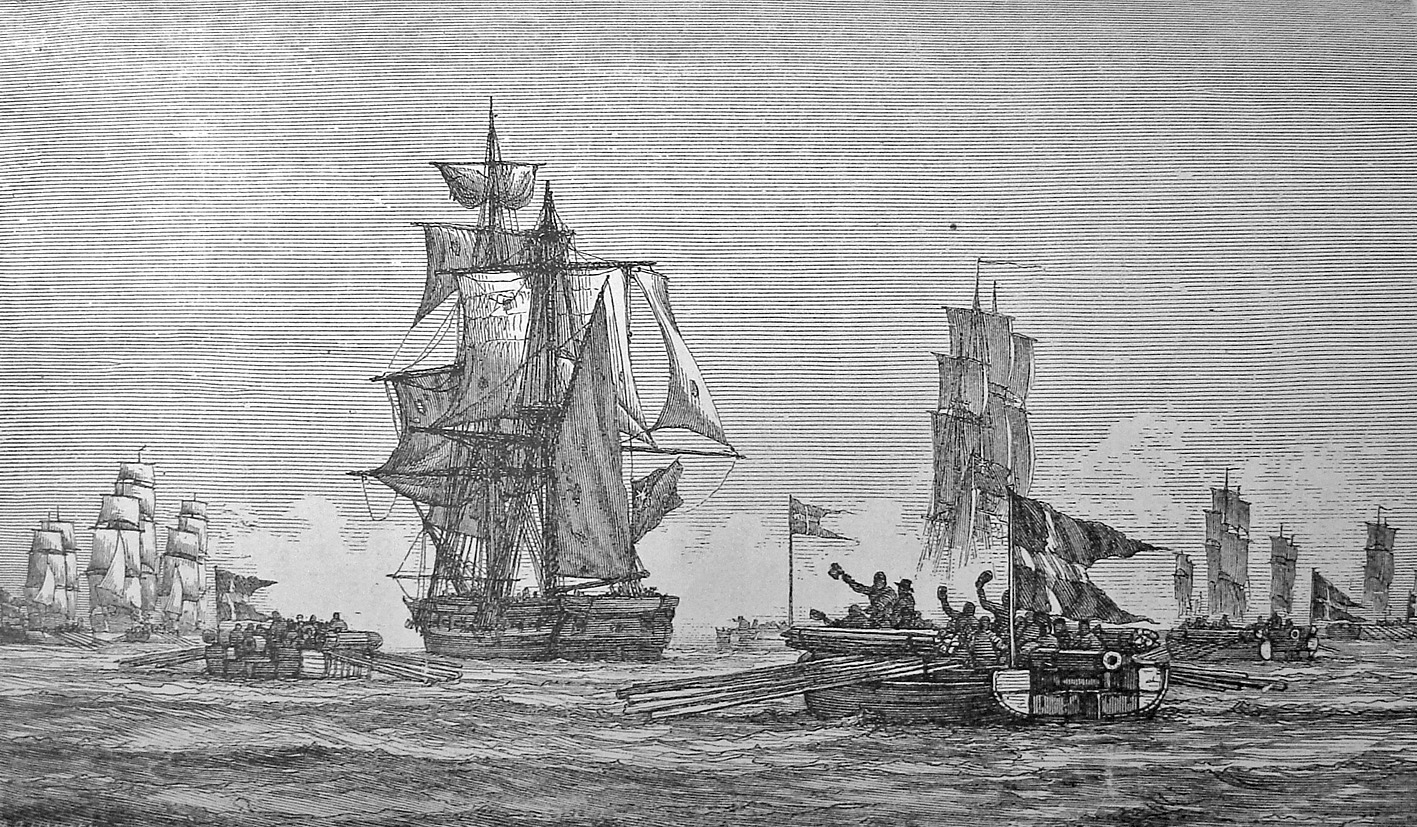
A Danish gunboat captures the British brig HMS Turbulent on 9 June 1808

In August, the news about the Dos de Mayo Uprising reached the Spanish troops stationed in Denmark. This led to a mutiny among the Spaniards, and the subsequent evacuation of the La Romana Division, where the British evacuated the majority of the Spanish troops in Denmark back to Spain, where they fought against the French in the Peninsular War.

=== State bankruptcy ===
From 1807 to 1813 the war was characterised by high inflation, with wages increasing several hundred percent and grain prices even more. It was not cheap for Denmark to keep an army operating in Holstein and although in 1810 the Danish government introduced a progressive income tax to cover the deficit, it did not have the administrative machinery needed to get this new system to work but instead tried to make up the deficit by printing more and more banknotes. From 1806 to 1813 the currency's total face value increased sixfold but the notes' real value significantly decreased. Thus the state itself went bankrupt, trying to remedy the situation by rushing through a regulation on 5 January 1813 for a change in the monetary system. The regulation determined that a new foreign bank would replace the old banks and start minting new coins with values fixed against foreign banknotes. This made minor savers, people with their money tied up in government bonds, or people holding higher-value banknotes relatively poor.

=== In Culture ===
- "Terje Vigen" (1862) – A ballad by Henrik Ibsen set during the English Wars, based on his time in Grimstad and most likely on his friendship with a Norwegian pilot named Svend Hanssen Haaø who made several trips to Denmark through the British blockade between 1807 and 1814.
- Terje Vigen (1917) – Directed by Victor David Sjöström, this adaptation of Ibsen's poem revolves around the British blockade of Norway.

== Bibliography ==
- Bourgois, Eric Lerdrup; Høffding, Niels (2007). Danmark og Napoleon. Hovedland. ISBN 978-87-7070-061-0.
- Feldbæk, Ole (2001). Slaget på Reden. Politikens Forlag. ISBN 87-567-4001-8.
- Hillingsø, K.G.H. (2007). Landkrigen, 1807. Gyldendal. ISBN 978-87-02-06004-1.
- Lindeberg, Lars (1974). De så det ske : Englandskrigene 1801-14 : Slaget på Reden • Guldalder • Statsbankerot. Lademann. ISBN 87-15-08075-7.
- Lindqvist, Herman (2004). Napoleon. Schibsted forlagene. ISBN 978-82-516-2157-1.
- Pocock, Tom (1987). Horatio Nelson. Pimlico.
- Scocozza, Benito; Jensen, Grethe (1999). Danmarkshistoriens Hvem, Hvad og Hvornår. Politikens Forlag. ISBN 87-567-6094-9.
- Scocozza, Benito (1997). Politikens bog om danske monarker. Politikens Forlag. ISBN 87-567-5772-7.
- Sundberg, Ulf (1998). Svenska krig, 1521-1814. Stockholm: Hjalmarson & Högberg. ISBN 91-89080-14-9.
