= Stable belt =

Military belt

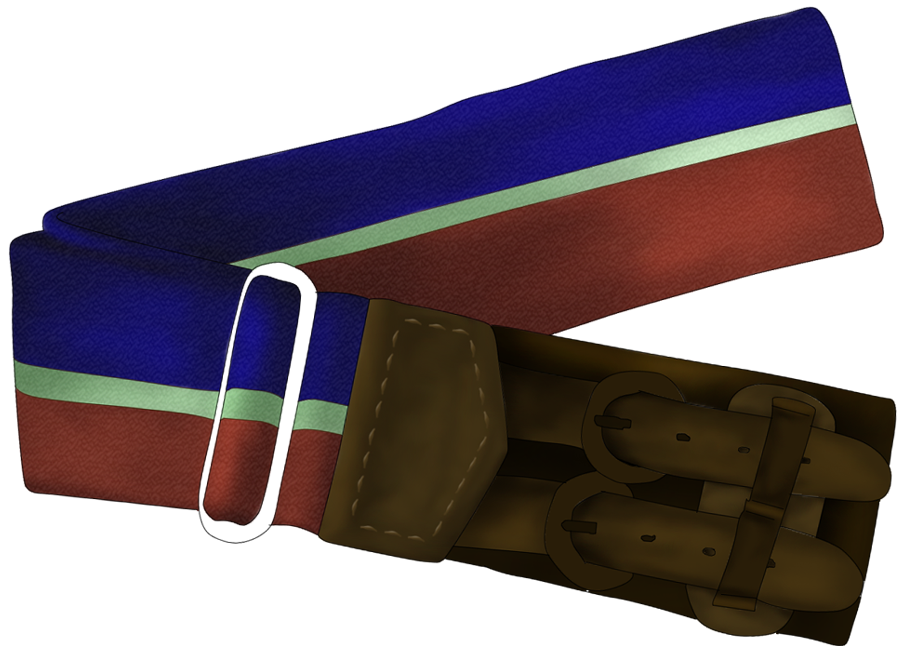
A pre-2007 stable belt of the Royal Air Force. Newer versions feature a metal decorative buckle.

A stable belt is a coloured belt worn at times by the armed forces of the United Kingdom, other Commonwealth countries, and a few other countries including Denmark, Brazil and Lebanon. The stripes vary by regiment and corps, identifying the wearer's unit, and in Brazil and Lebanon they are known as gymnastic belts.

The term "stable belt" originates from when British cavalrymen would place the surcingle around the waist when cleaning the stables and tending to their horses. In the 1950s they spread to all branches of the armed forces, adding a splash of colour and individuality to the drab khaki working uniforms. Initially they were resisted by many senior officers, who saw them as too individualistic, but they soon became accepted throughout the UK forces, and spread to the forces of a number of other countries. The "gymnastic belt" of some countries has a similar appearance and purpose, with a name reflecting its origin in physical training equipment. Sword belts of similar appearance are used on ceremonial occasions by some military forces.

== Australia ==
The Australian Army adopted the stable belt in the late 1970s, however they were removed from service in 1995.

== Brazil ==
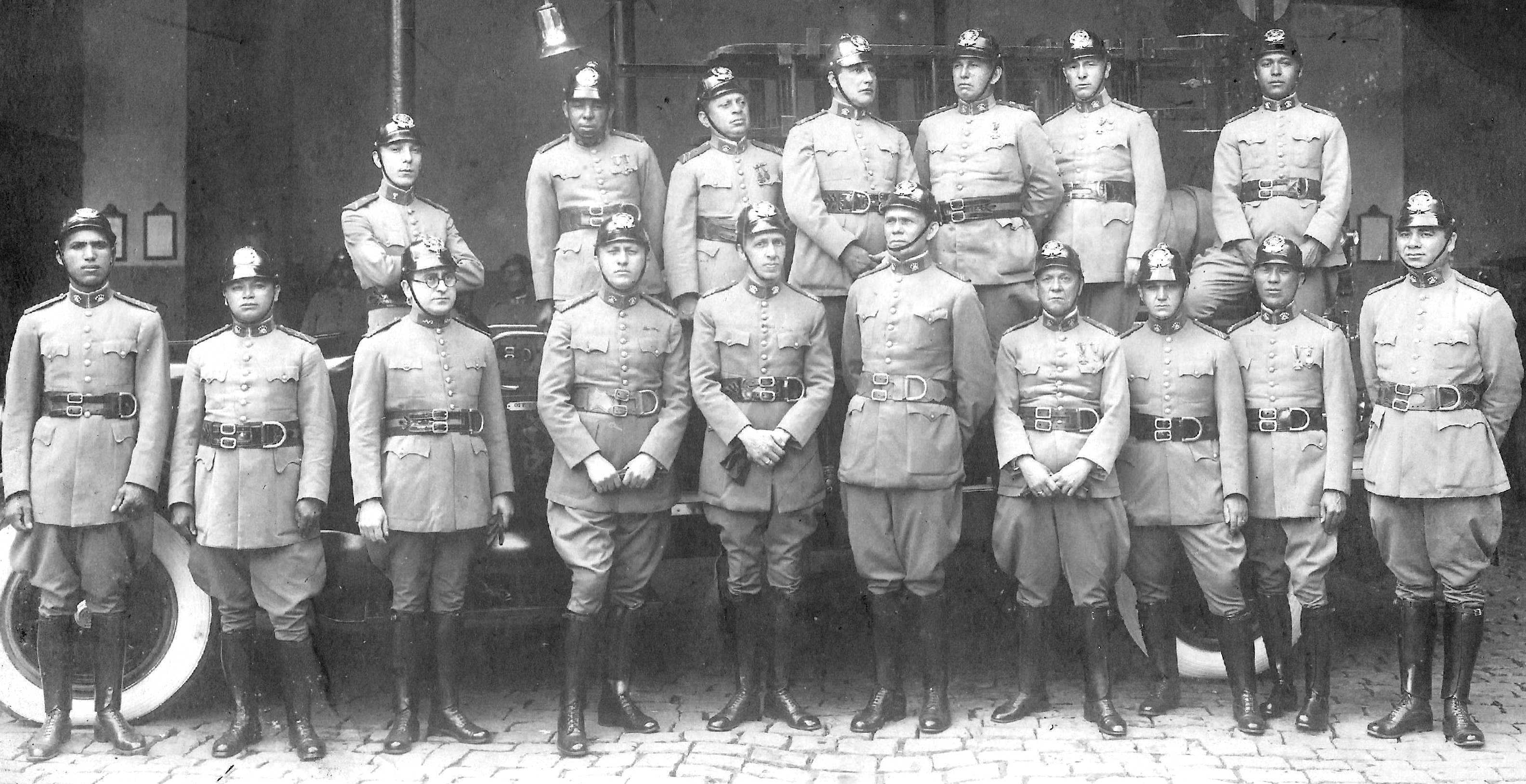
Firefighters Corps of Paraná - 1923.

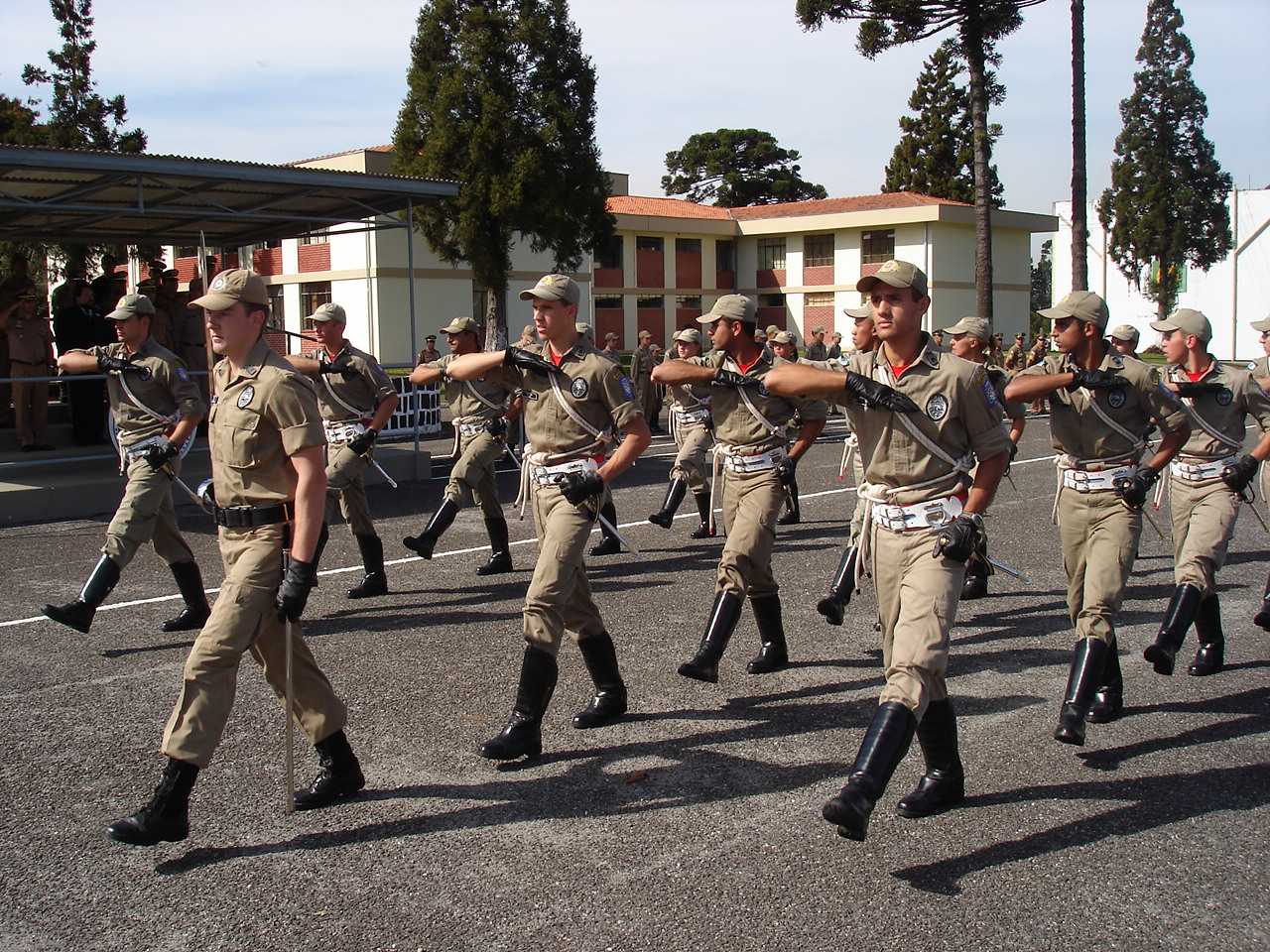
Brazilian Firefighters Cadets - 2009.

In Brazil, the gymnastic belt (Portuguese: cinto ginástico) is one of the most traditional elements of the uniforms of the Military Firefighters Corps. It has been used with few modifications since 1887. Made of cotton and leather, earlier examples were reinforced to serve as climbing harnesses. Modern gymnastic belts are of lighter construction and only worn as ceremonial item. There are two versions of the gymnastics belt:

For Officers:
The belt is red with a horizontal stripe in blue, with silver-coloured metal buckles. In the 1960s, the leather components were white.

For other ranks (sergeants, corporals, and privates):
The belt is red, with gold-coloured metal buckles.

== Denmark ==
The Danish Army, Home Guard, and Air Force all use stable belts. The Danish Defence's close co-operation with the British Army of the Rhine in the 1950s created the interest in a similar belt for the Guard Hussar Regiment, which was introduced in 1968. In the late 1970s it was decided to allow stable belts for all regiments in Denmark. The design of the belt would be based on the colours(center) of the regiment, and a colour(edge) to signify their branch. To show the transition between branch and regiment colours, a thin line was introduced, there is however no system with these. Army branch color:

- Red: Infantry troops
- White:Guard Hussar Regiment (however, white in center instead of edge)
- Bordeaux: Artillery troops, Logistic Troops and Jutland Dragoon Regiment
- Black: Engineer troops
- Blue: Signal troops
- Grey: Intelligence Regiment (however, grey in centre instead of edge)

The Danish armed forces had a total of 43 different stable belts, of which about sixteen remain in use. Only the standard black stable belt is issued, other belts have to be purchased individually, so are neither regulation nor compulsory.

=== In use ===
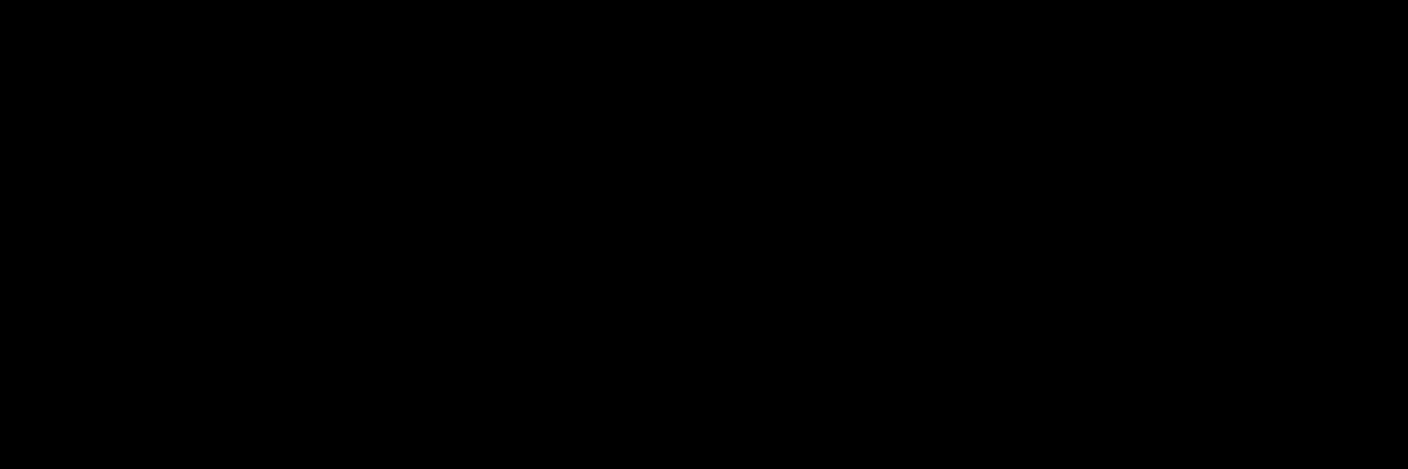
Standard belt used by Danish forces

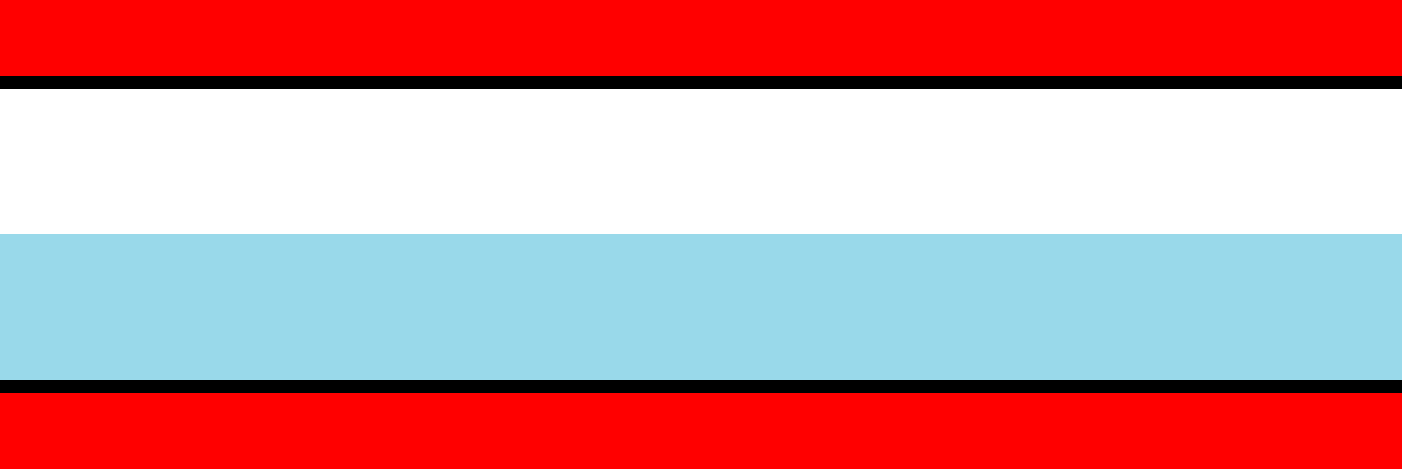
Royal Life Guards

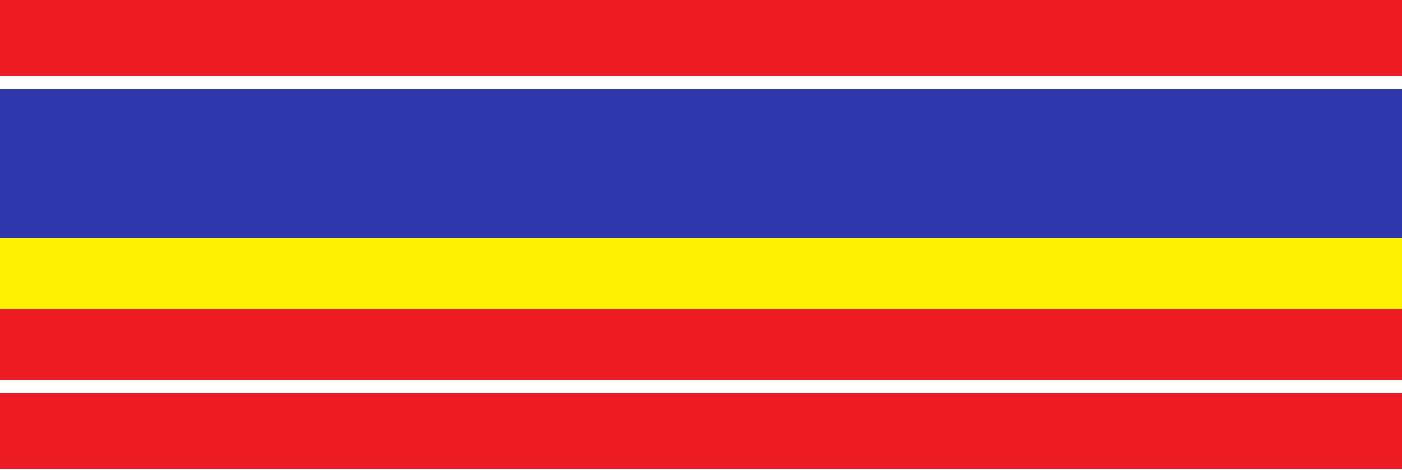
Schleswig Regiment of Foot (2.Reg)

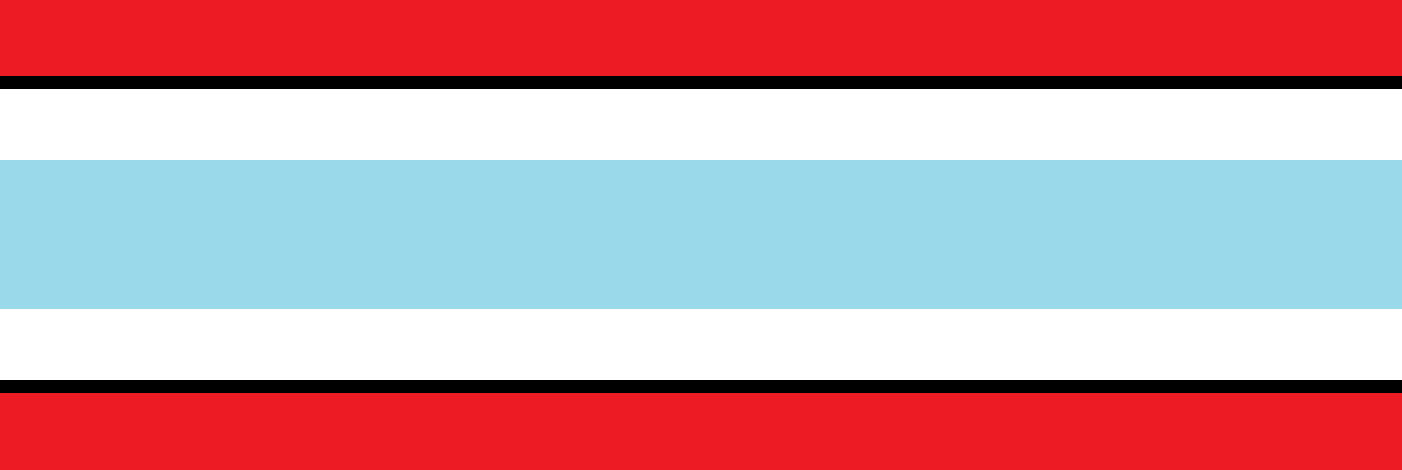
Bornholms Regiment

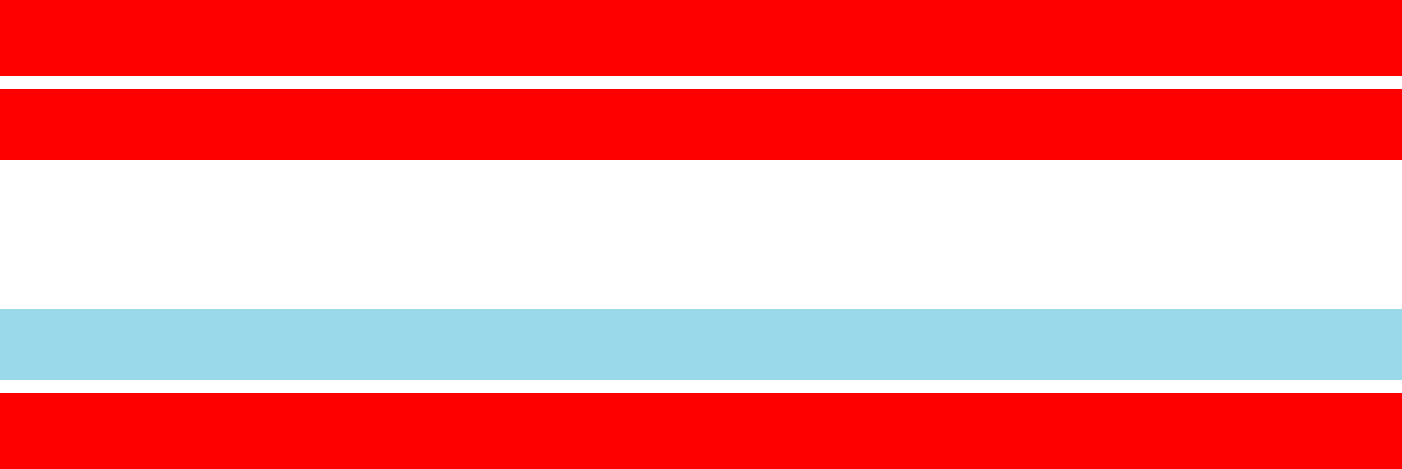
Jutland Dragoon Regiment

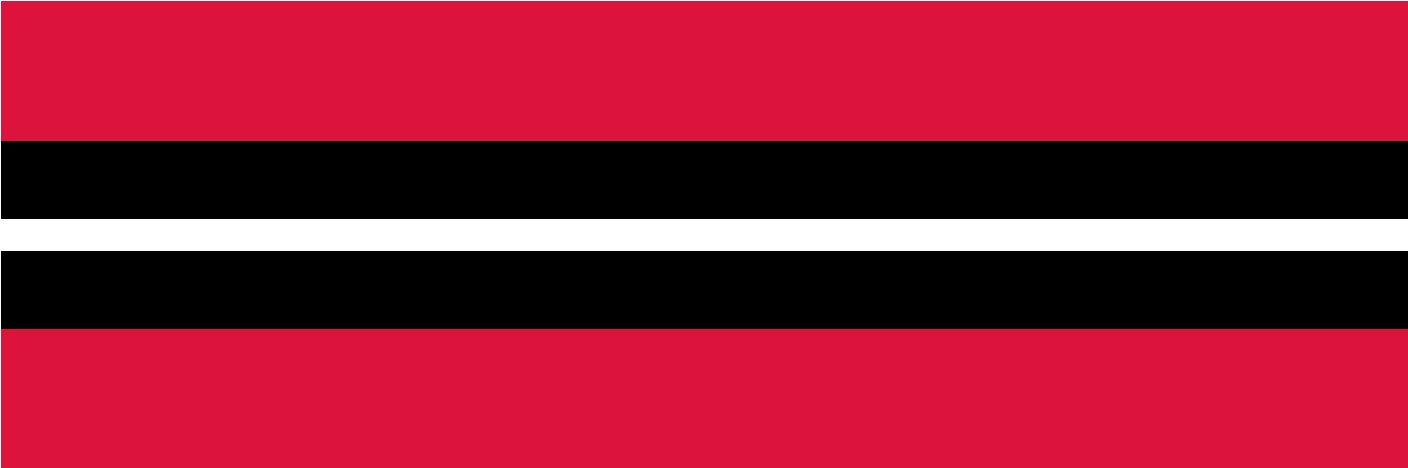
Guard Hussar Regiment

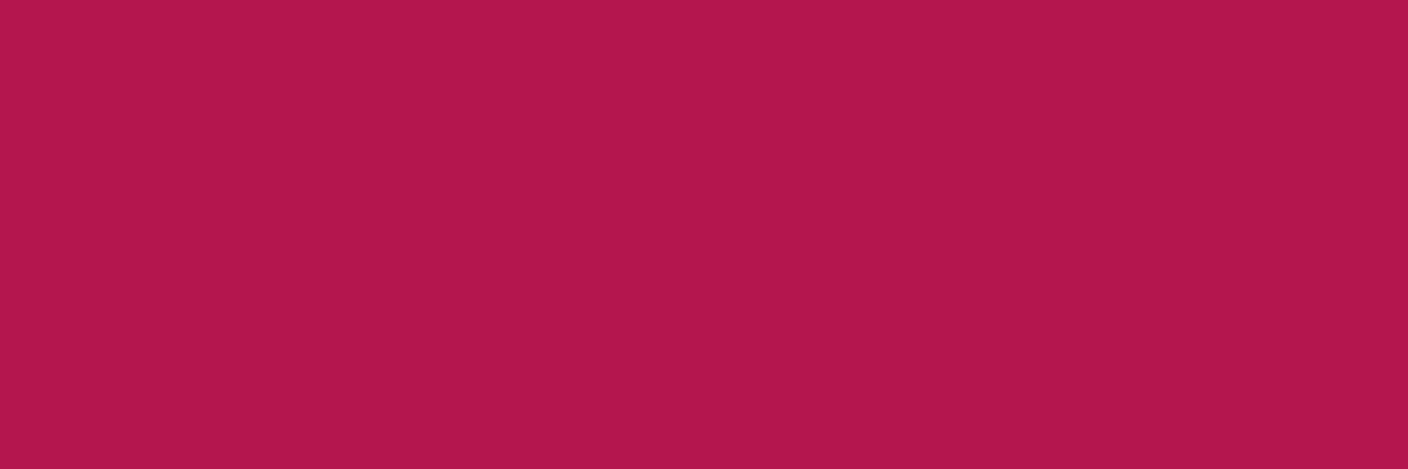
Danish Artillery Regiment

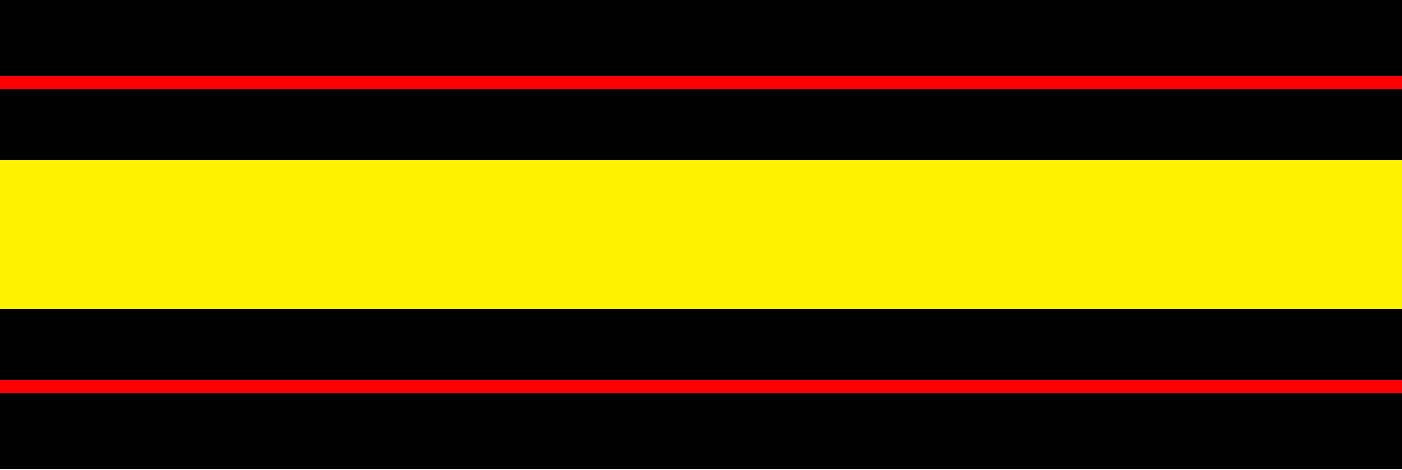
Engineer Regiment

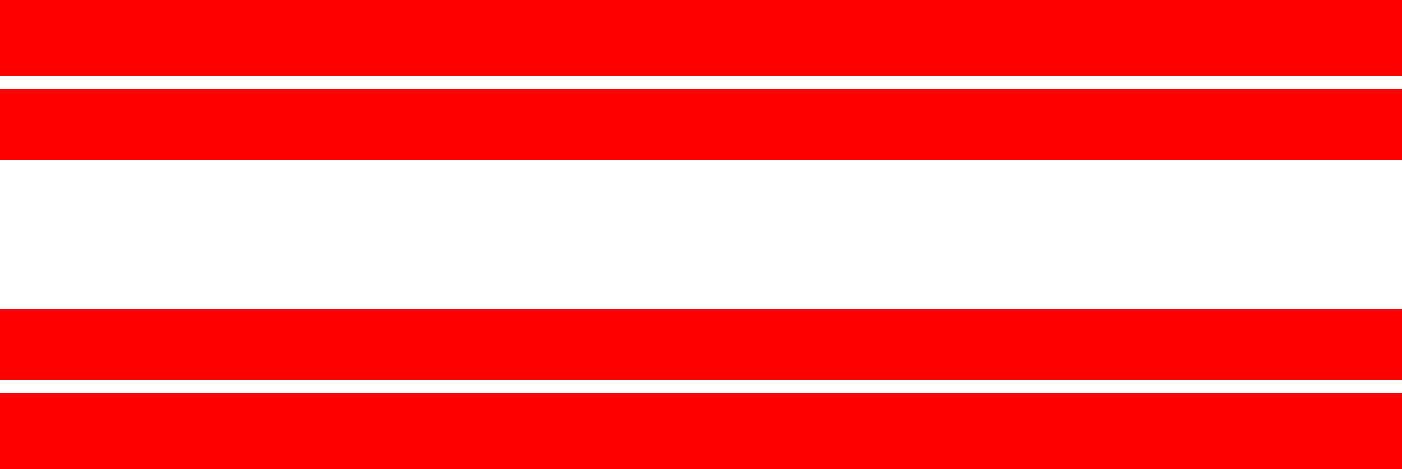
Logistic Regiment

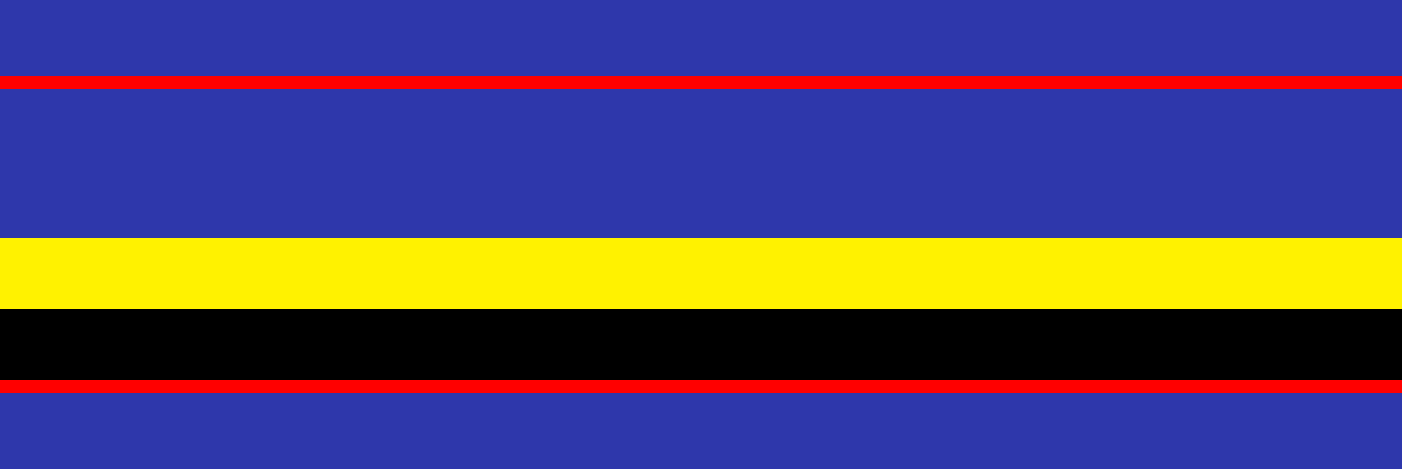
Joint Signals Regiment

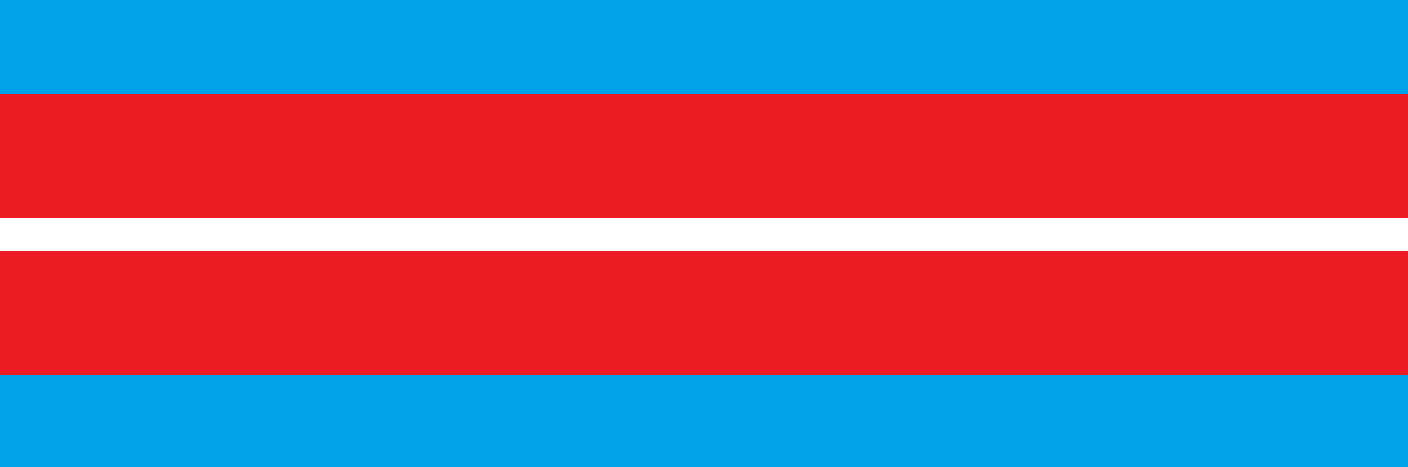
Intelligence Regiment

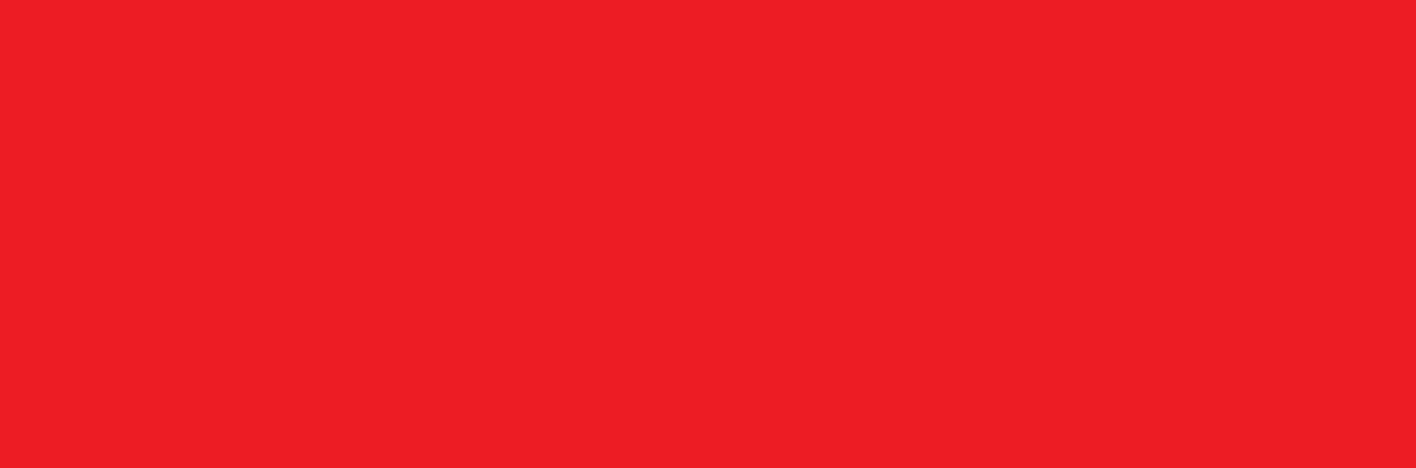
Army Staff

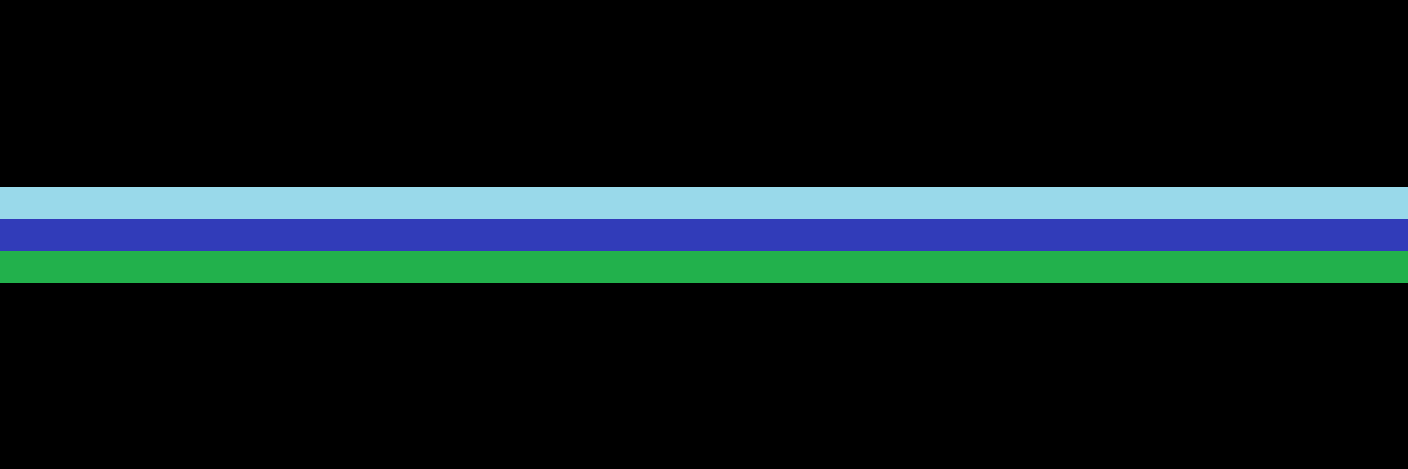
Danish Home Guard

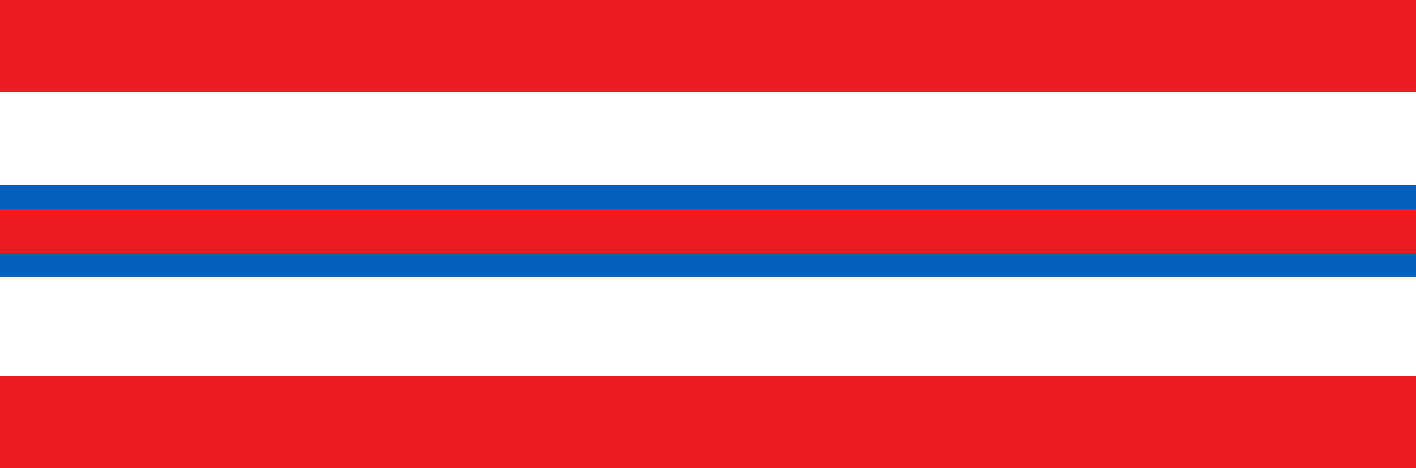
Joint Arctic Command

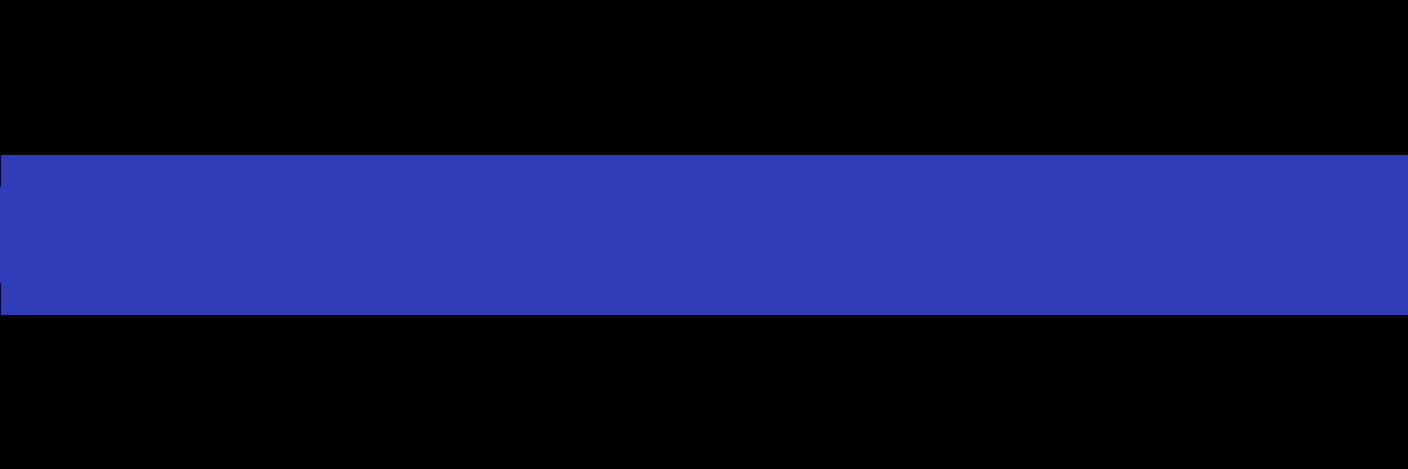
Royal Danish Air Force

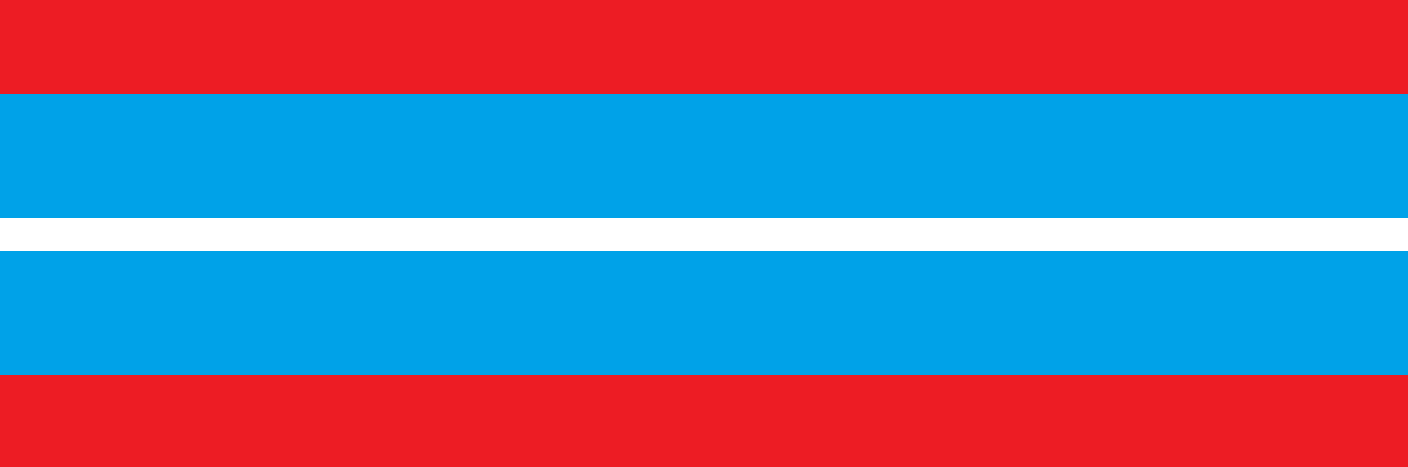
United Nations peacekeeping

=== Disbanded regiments ===
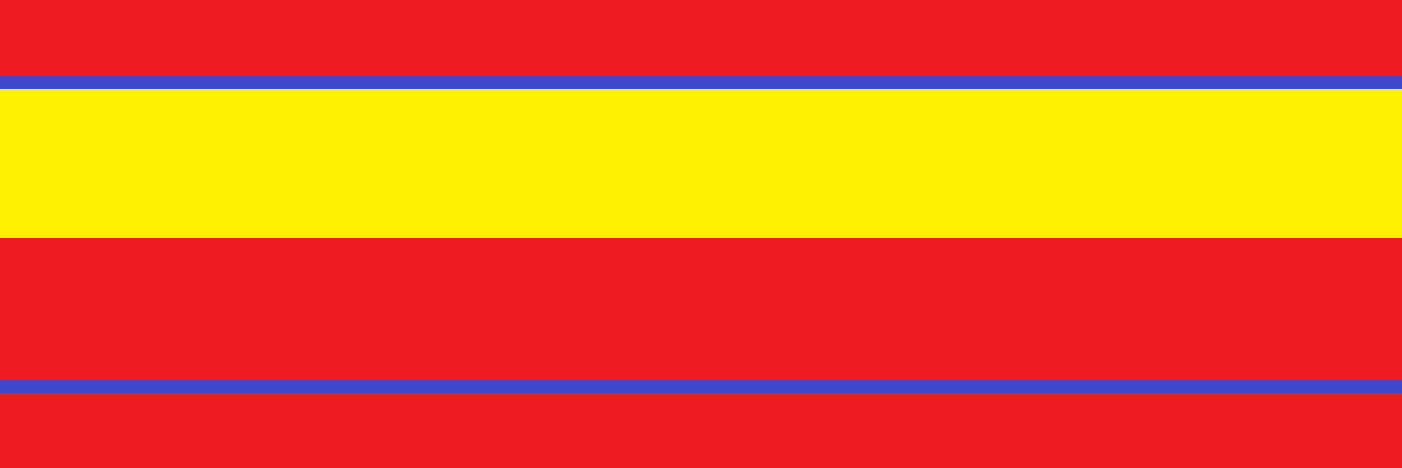
Danish Life Regiment
1.Reg

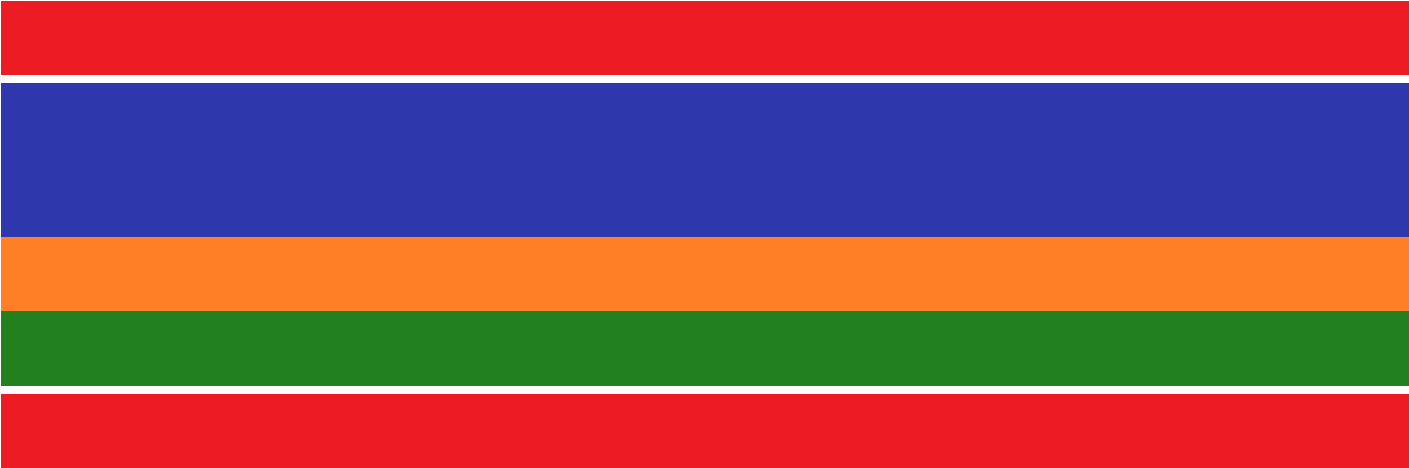
Prince's Life Regiment
3.Reg

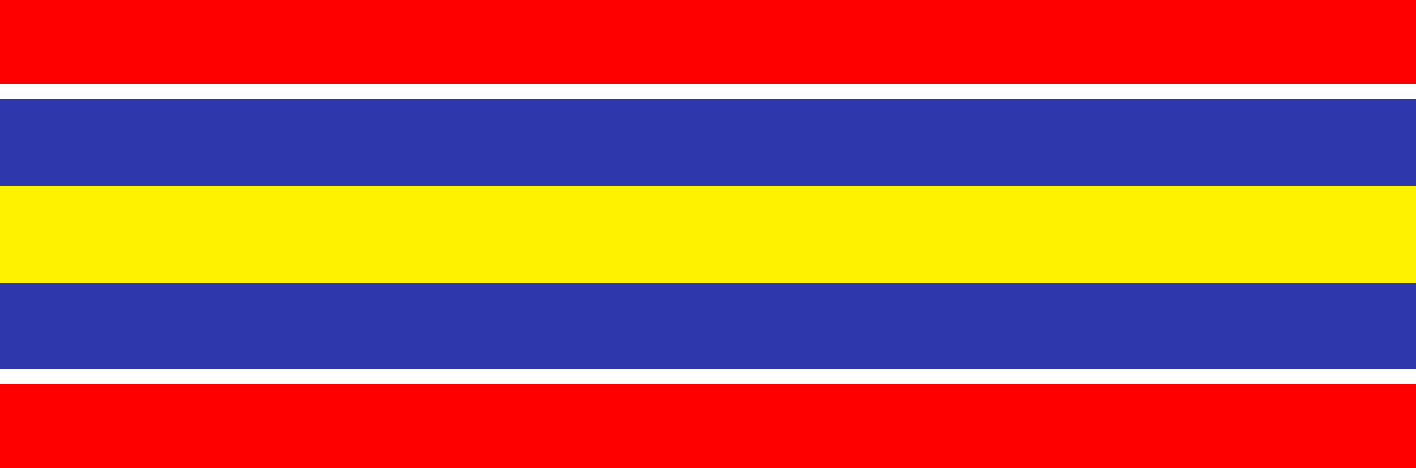
Zealand Life Regiment
4.Reg

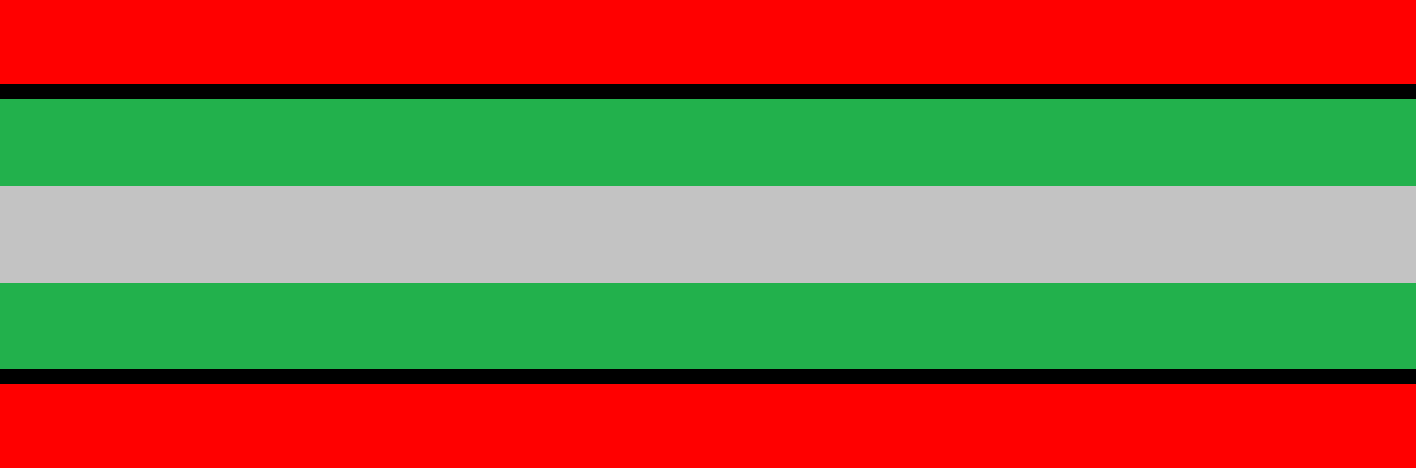
Funen Life Regiment
6.Reg

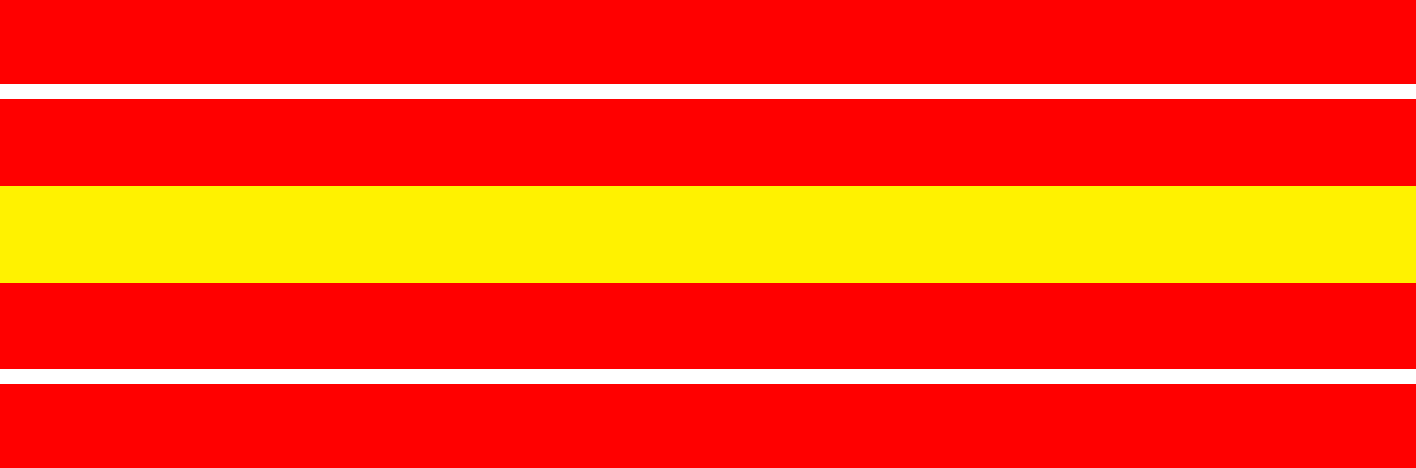
Queen's Life Regiment
8.REG

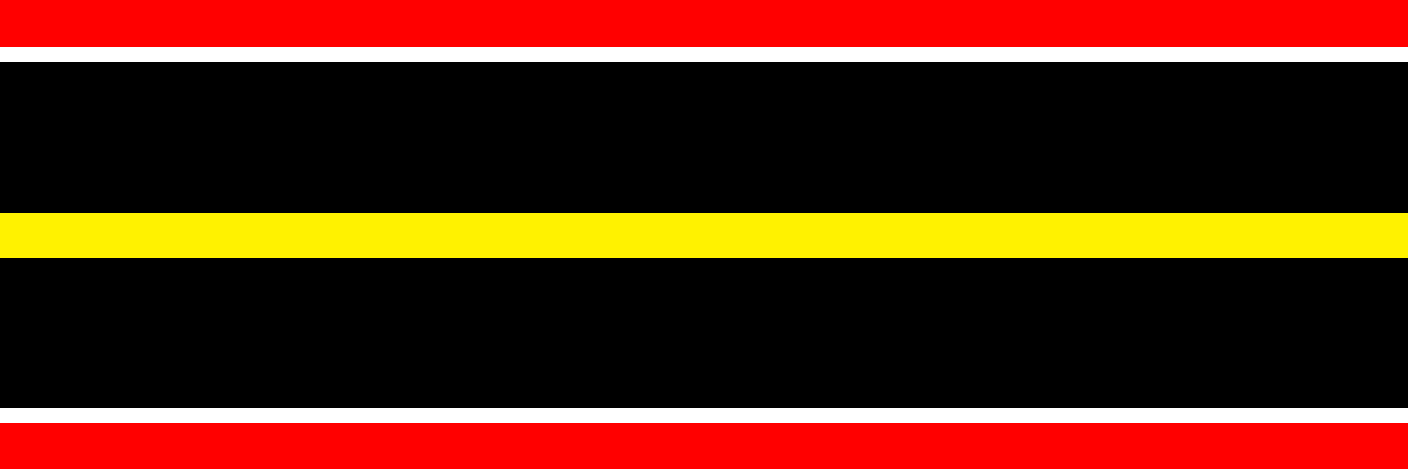
King's Jutlandic Regiment of Foot
9.Reg

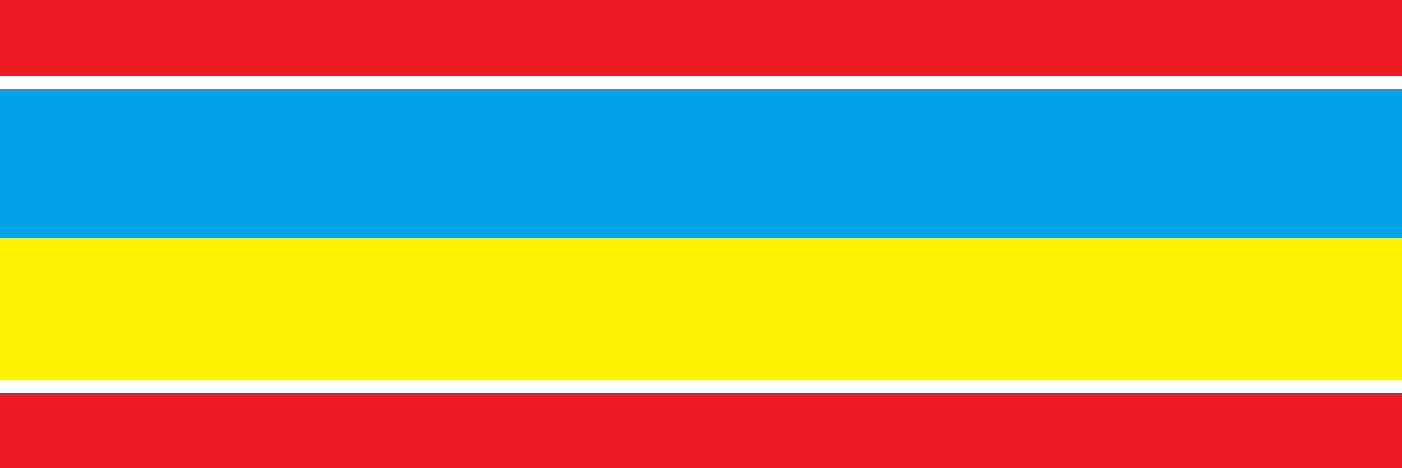
Marine Regiment

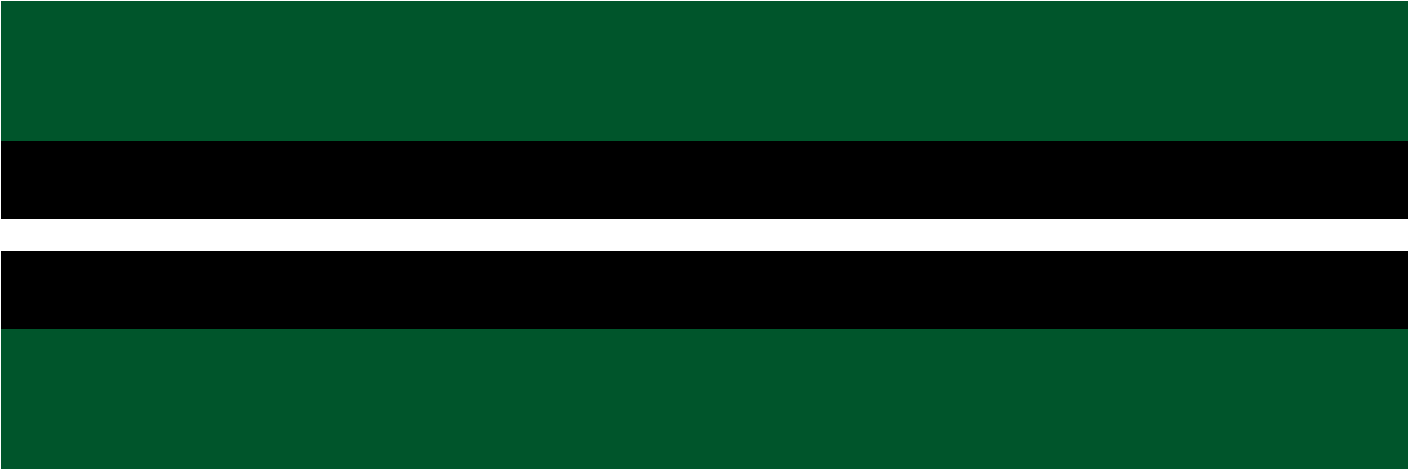
Guard Hussar Regiment
III. Battalion

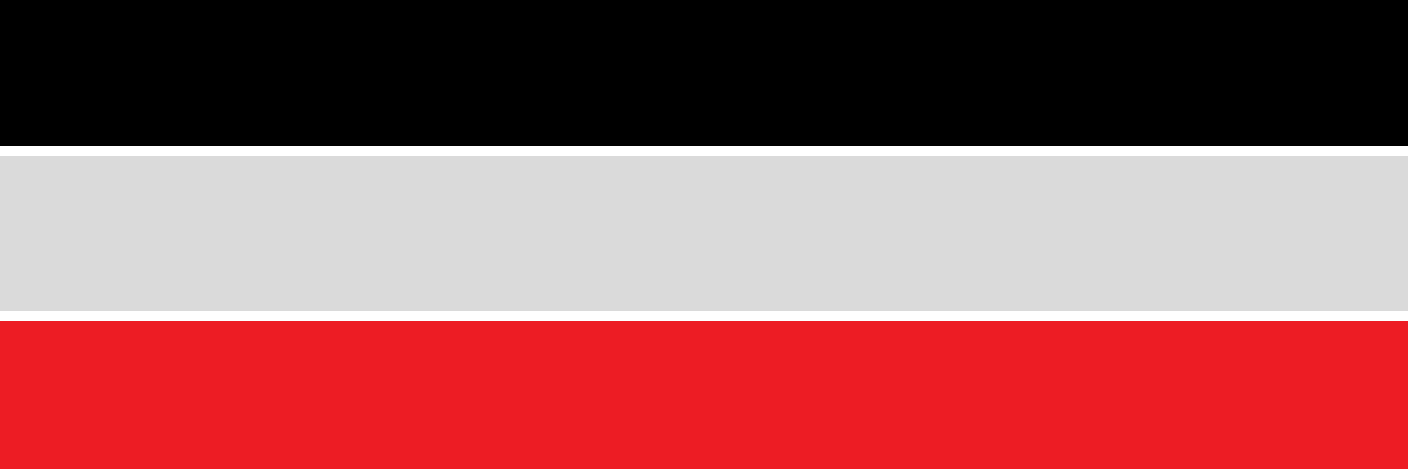
Army Combat and Fire Support Center

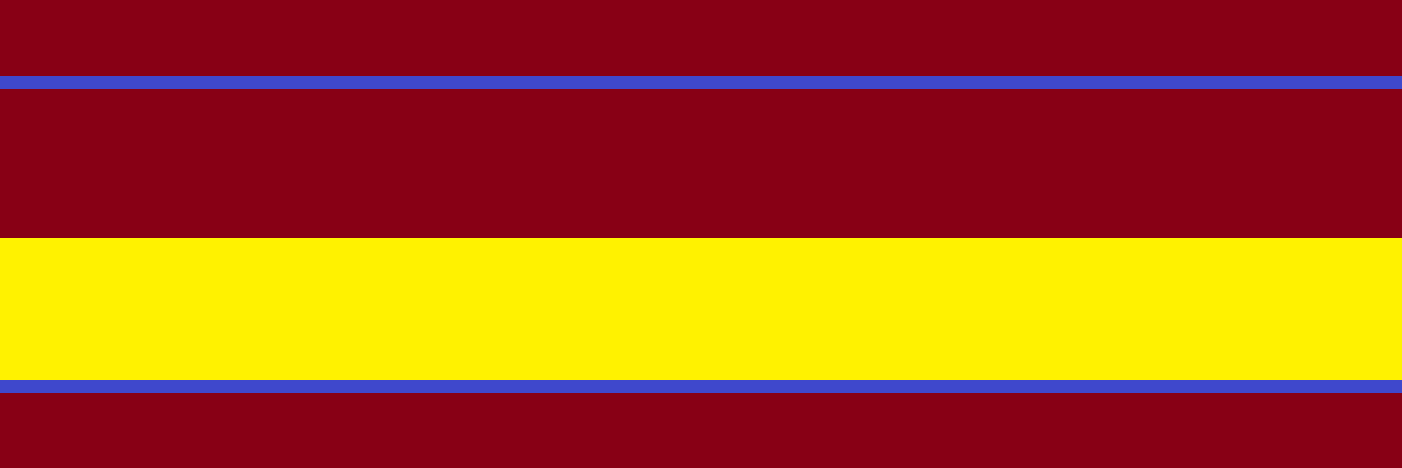
Crown Artillery Regiment

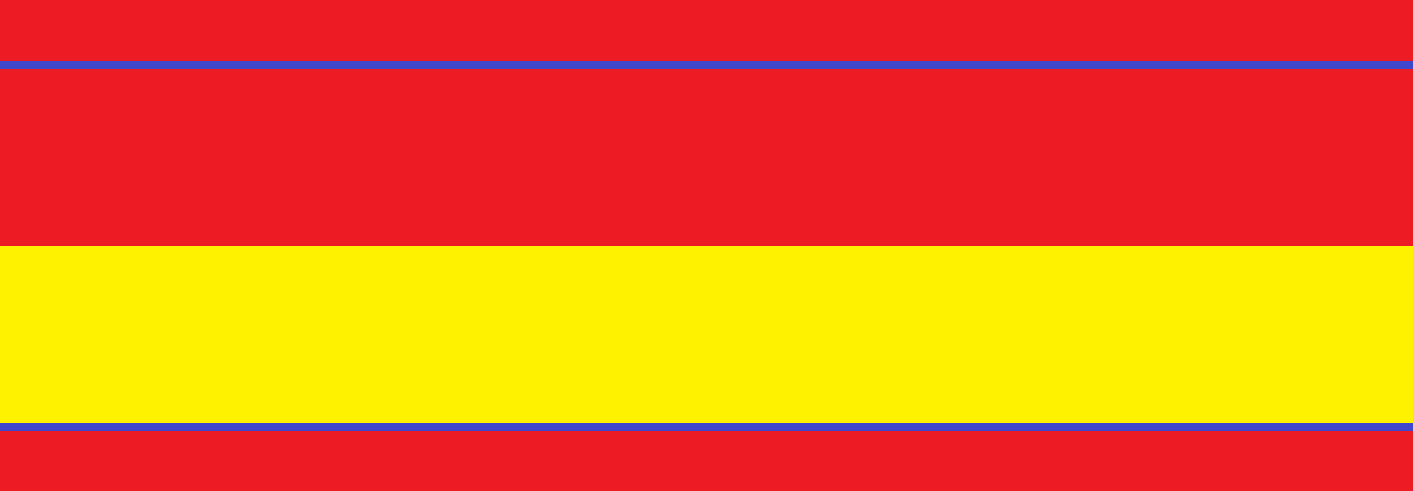
King's Artillery Regiment

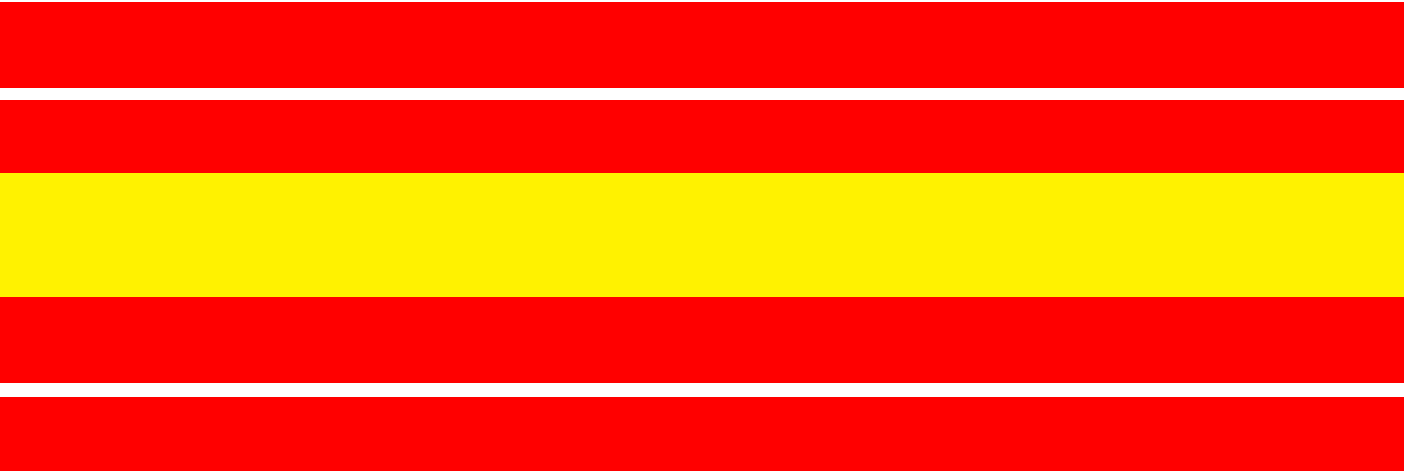
Queen's Artillery Regiment

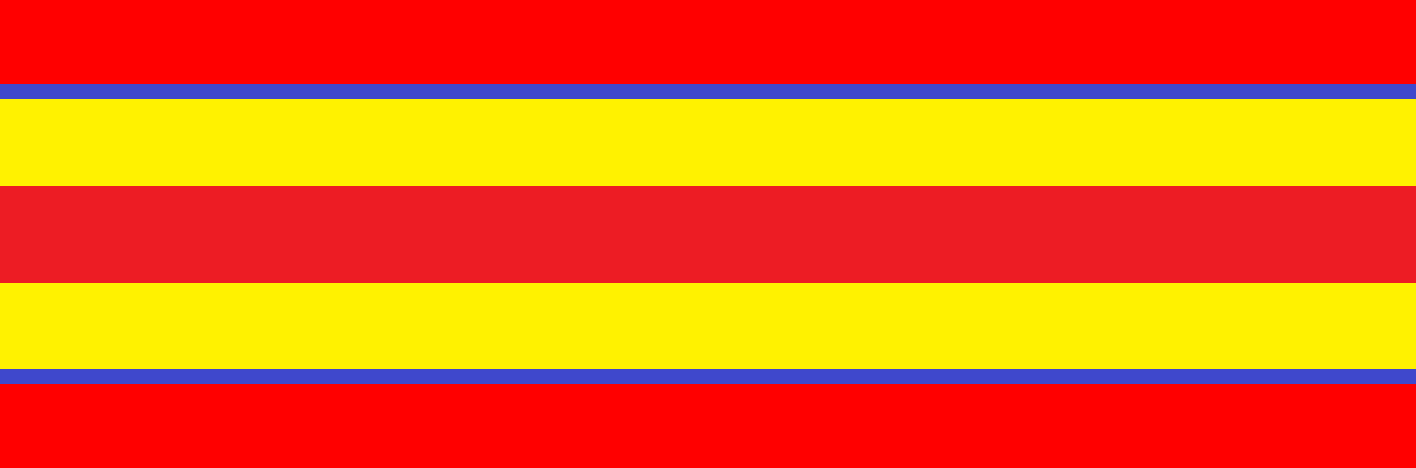
North Jutland Artillery Regiment

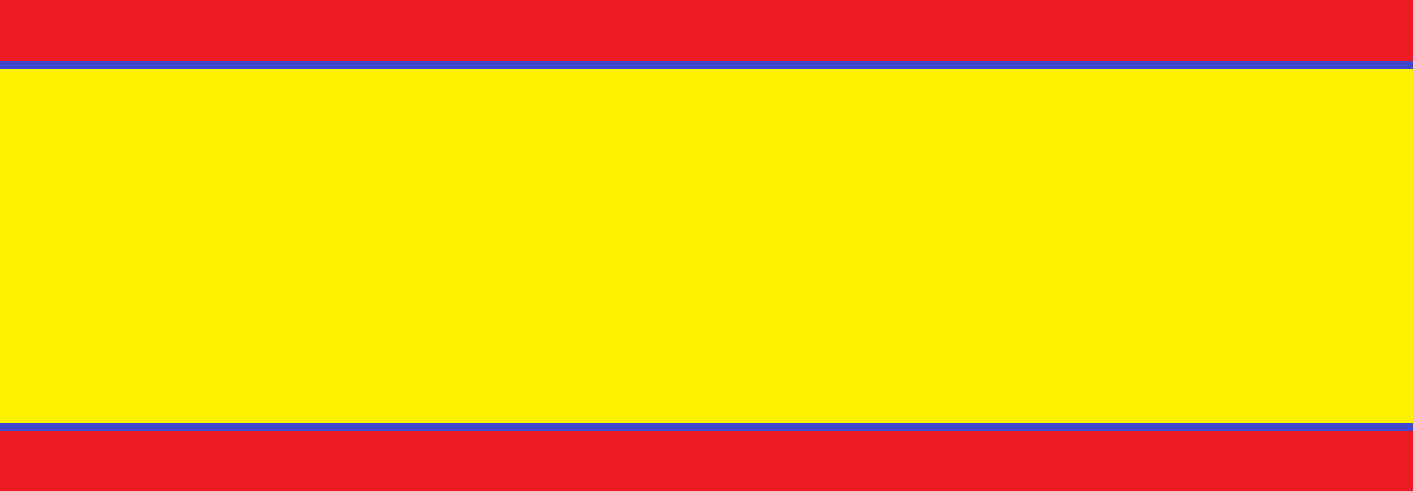
Southern Jutland Artillery Regiment

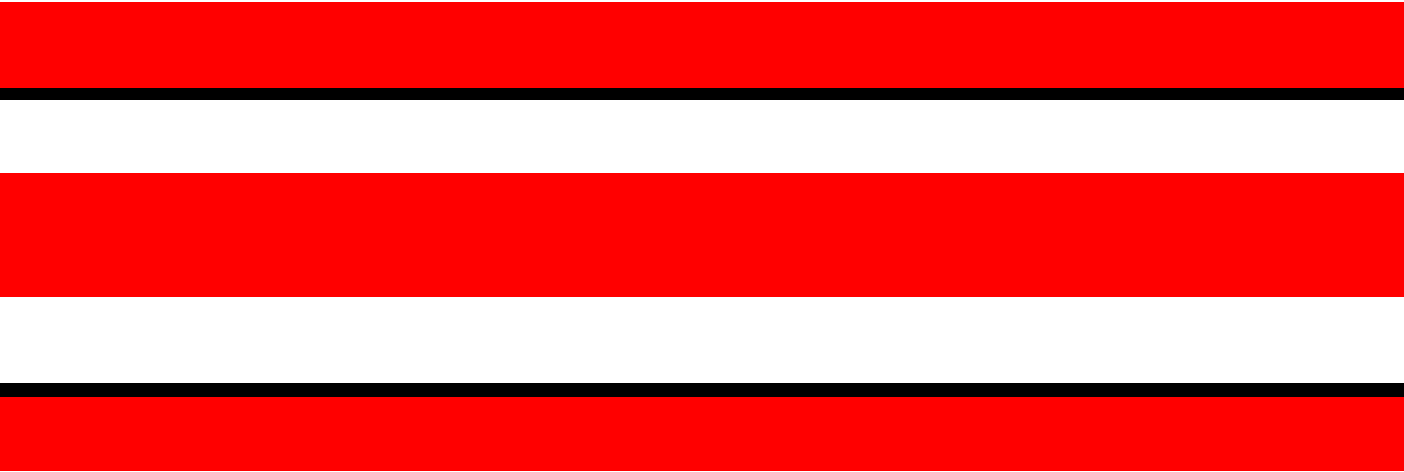
Zealandic Logistic Regiment 1961-1997
Danish International Logistical Center 2000-2005

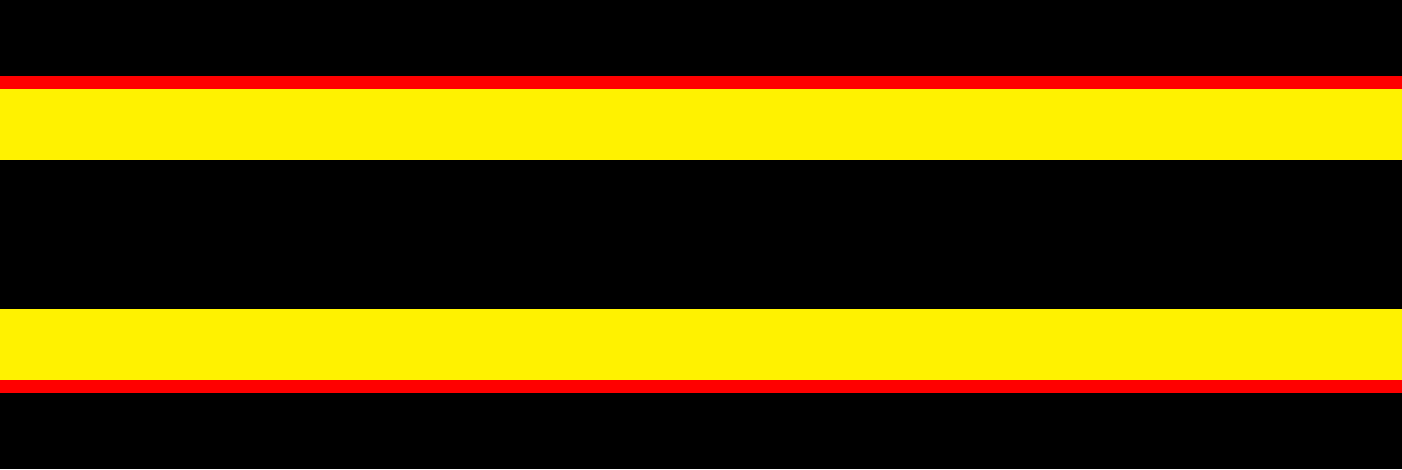
Zealand Engineer Regiment

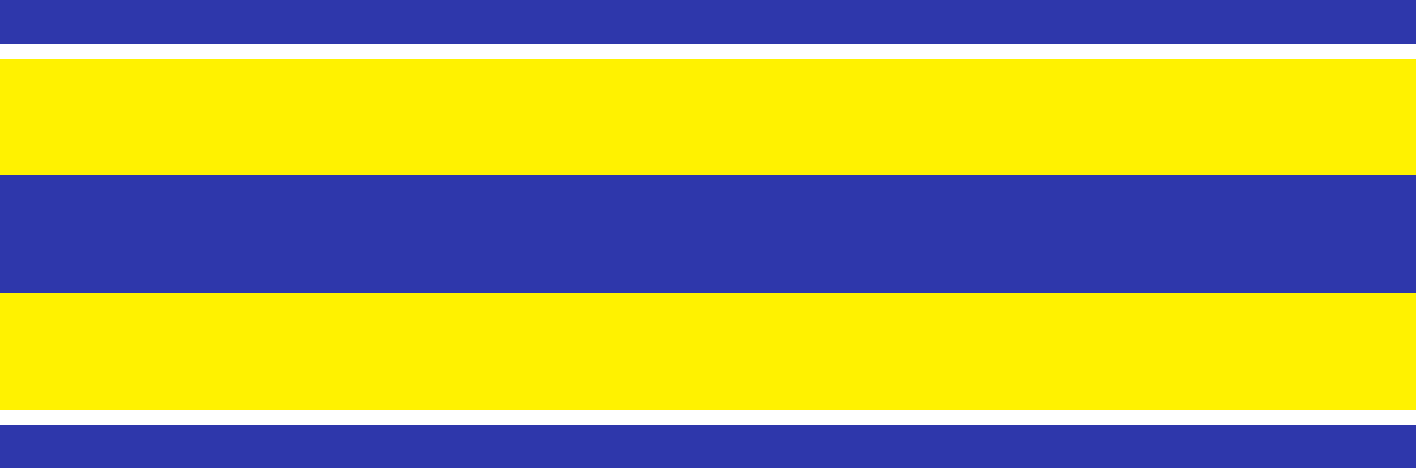
Zealand Signal Regiment

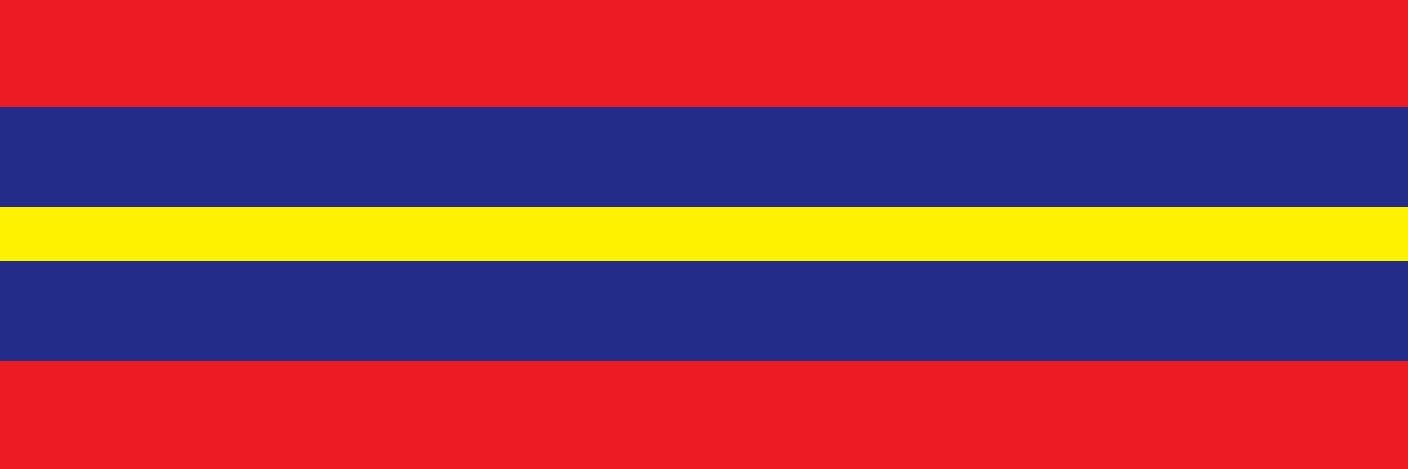
Jutlandic Air Defence Regiment

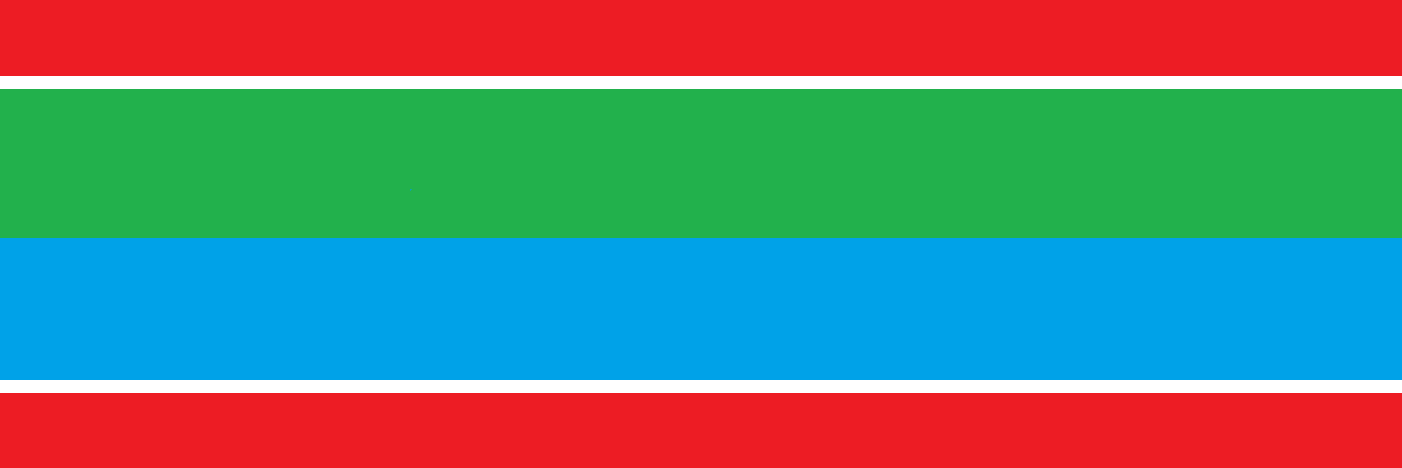
Army Air Service

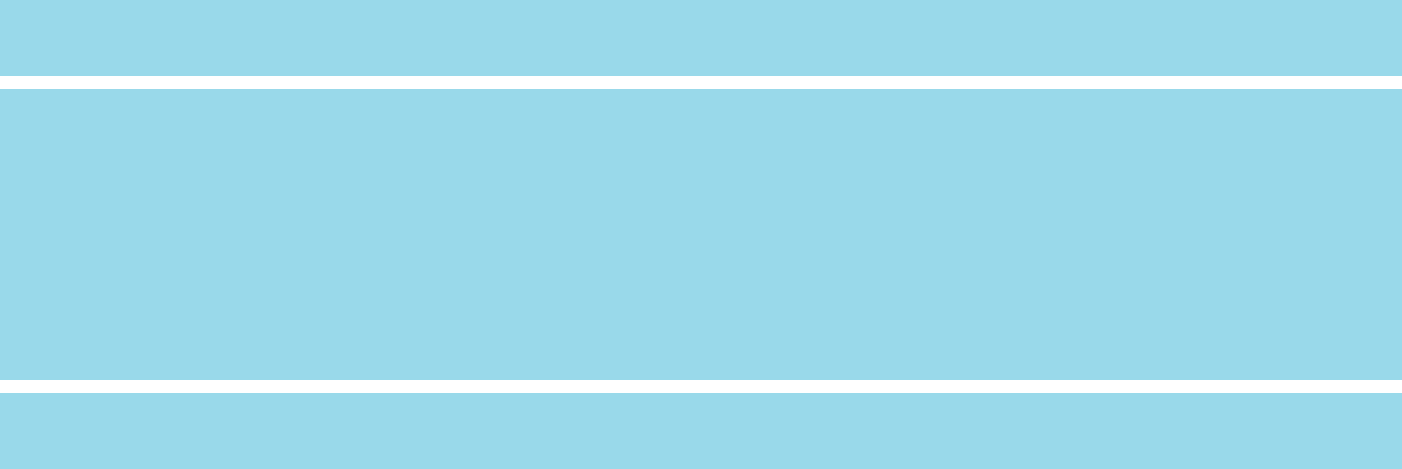
Intendant Corps

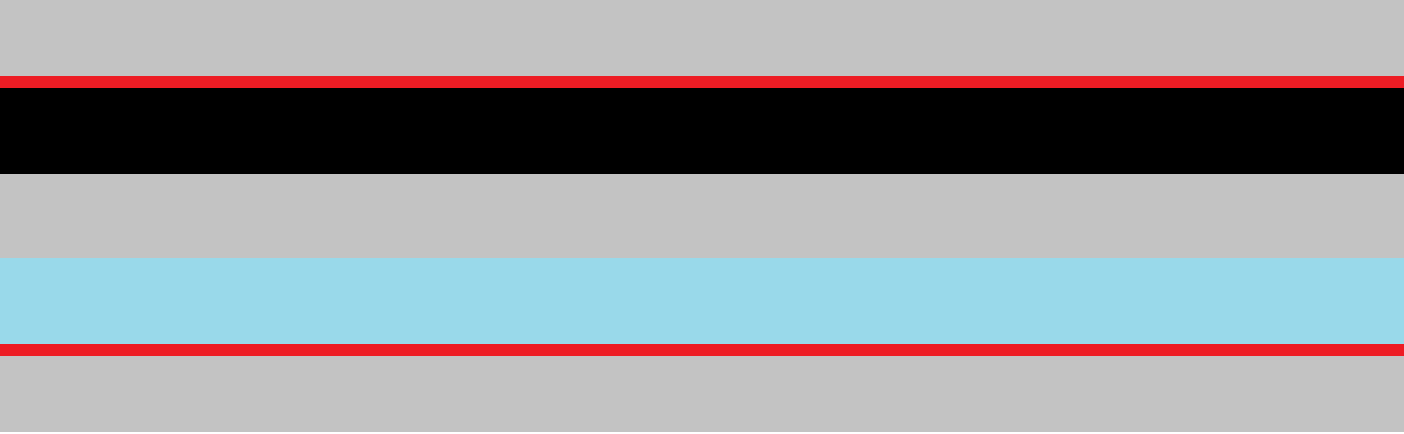
HMAK

== Lebanon ==
Lebanese firefighters (الدفاع المدني, i.e. "Civil Defense") use the same type of gymnastic belt as used by firefighters in Brazil.

== New Zealand ==
The various Corps and Regiments of the New Zealand Army wear stable belts. Most corps wear the same patterns of belt as their counterparts in the British Army

=== Corps and regiments ===
New Zealand Corps of Officer Cadets	Royal New Zealand Artillery	Royal New Zealand Armoured Corps
Queen Alexandra's Mounted Rifles	Corps of Royal New Zealand Engineers	Royal New Zealand Corps of Signals
Royal New Zealand Infantry Regiment	New Zealand Special Air Service	New Zealand Intelligence Corps
Royal New Zealand Army Logistic Regiment	Royal New Zealand Army Medical Corps	Royal New Zealand Dental Corps
Royal New Zealand Chaplains Department	New Zealand Army Legal Service	Corps of Royal New Zealand Military Police
Royal New Zealand Army Education Corps	New Zealand Army Physical Training Corps	Royal New Zealand Nursing Corps

Queen Alexandra's Mounted Rifles;

The QAMR belt is black with a central amber stripe as used by the original Queen Alexandra's Mounted Rifles, they are also the colours of the Taranaki, where the unit's foundations were laid in the early 1860s.

Royal New Zealand Infantry Regiment;

Personnel of the Royal New Zealand Infantry Regiment, with the exception of those serving in Territorial Force battalion groups, wear the regimental belt of the Durham Light Infantry, being rifle green with two thin red stripes. The belt was adopted as the RNZIR Corps belt in 1970. The Durham Light Infantry regimental belt was given to the 1st Battalion, Royal New Zealand Infantry Regiment when it relieved the 1st Battalion, Durham Light Infantry at Sarawak, Borneo in May 1966.

New Zealand Special Air Service;

Originates from belt worn by the British Special Air Service. It was first worn in 1965 by 1 Detachment, 1 Ranger Squadron NZSAS. The colours originate from a concept by David Stirling integrating the Oxford Blue and Cambridge Blue.

Royal New Zealand Army Logistic Regiment;

The Royal New Zealand Army Logistic Regiment stable belt is blue with a silver buckle displaying the regimental badge surrounded by the regimental motto "Ma Nga Hua Tu-Tangata" (By our actions we are known).

=== Reserve Infantry Battalions ===
The reserve battalions of the Royal New Zealand Infantry Regiment retain their own patterns of stable belt. In 2013 the reserve battalions were amalgamated, reducing their number from six to three. No decision was made on the future of the various battalions' belts.

2nd (Canterbury, and Nelson-Marlborough and West Coast) Battalion	3rd (Auckland (Countess of Ranfurly's Own) and Northland) Battalion	4th (Otago and Southland) Battalion
Mackenzie tartan
5th (Wellington West Coast and Taranaki) Battalion (Officers and Warrant Officers)	5th (Wellington West Coast and Taranaki) Battalion (Other soldiers)	6th (Hauraki) Battalion
7th (Wellington (City of Wellington's Own) and Hawke's Bay) Battalion

2nd (Canterbury, and Nelson-Marlborough and West Coast) Battalion;

Rifle green, as worn by the Battalions Allied Regiment, The Royal Irish Rangers.

3rd (Auckland (Countess of Ranfurly's Own) and Northland) Battalion;

Two sets of thin red and white stripes on a black background, adopted in 1995. Originally the belt consisted of three evenly-sized stripes of red, black, and white, and were based on the regiment's colours.

4th (Otago and Southland) Battalion;

The Otago and Southland Regimental belt is that of Queen's Own Highlanders, and is the pattern of the McKenzie tartan.

5th (Wellington West Coast and Taranaki) Battalion;

Two separate belts are worn; officers and warrant officers wear a black belt with central stripes of red, green, yellow, mauve, and red, while soldiers below the rank of warrant officer wear a black belt with central stripes of yellow, red, green, and mauve. The belts adopted in 1973 were based on the Royal Hampshire Regiment with colours stemming from the regimental colours and the colours of the lace and facings on the uniforms of the 37th (North Hampshire) Regiment of Foot and 67th (South Hampshire) Regiment.

6th (Hauraki) Battalion;

Thames blue with a gold strip in the middle, derived from the old Royal Warwickshire Regiment which in turn is derived from the old 6th Regiment of Foot. The 6th Foot were once charged with guarding the Crown Jewels in the Tower of London; hence the blue of the belt represents the Thames river and the gold stripe, the crown jewels. The belt was introduced in 1975 and has a buckle in worn centre which has the Regiments badge mounted.

7th (Wellington (City of Wellington's Own) and Hawke's Bay) Battalion;

The 7th Wellington (City of Wellington's Own) and Hawke's Bay Battalion Group inherited the York and Lancaster Regiment stable belt. The belt is composed of maroon bands at the top and bottom (16mm wide), with a centre stripe of black (18mm wide) with a silver stripe above and gold stripe (each 6mm wide) below the centre strip. The York and Lancaster Regiment was allied to the Wellington Regiment in 1913 in recognition of the York and Lancs (65th of Foot) 19 year participation in the New Zealand Wars.

== United Kingdom ==
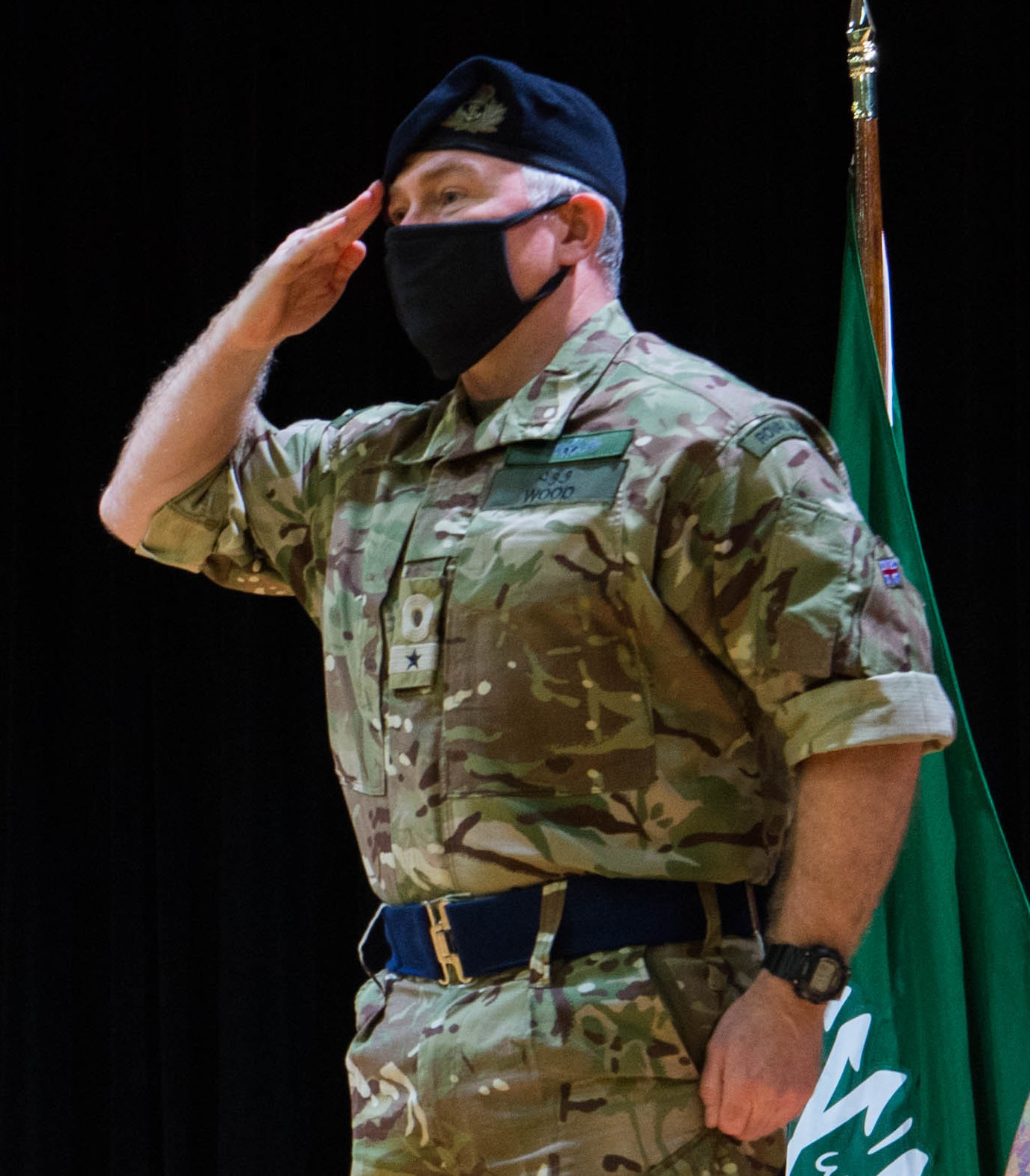
Single colour, front fastening, Royal Navy stable belt, (2020).

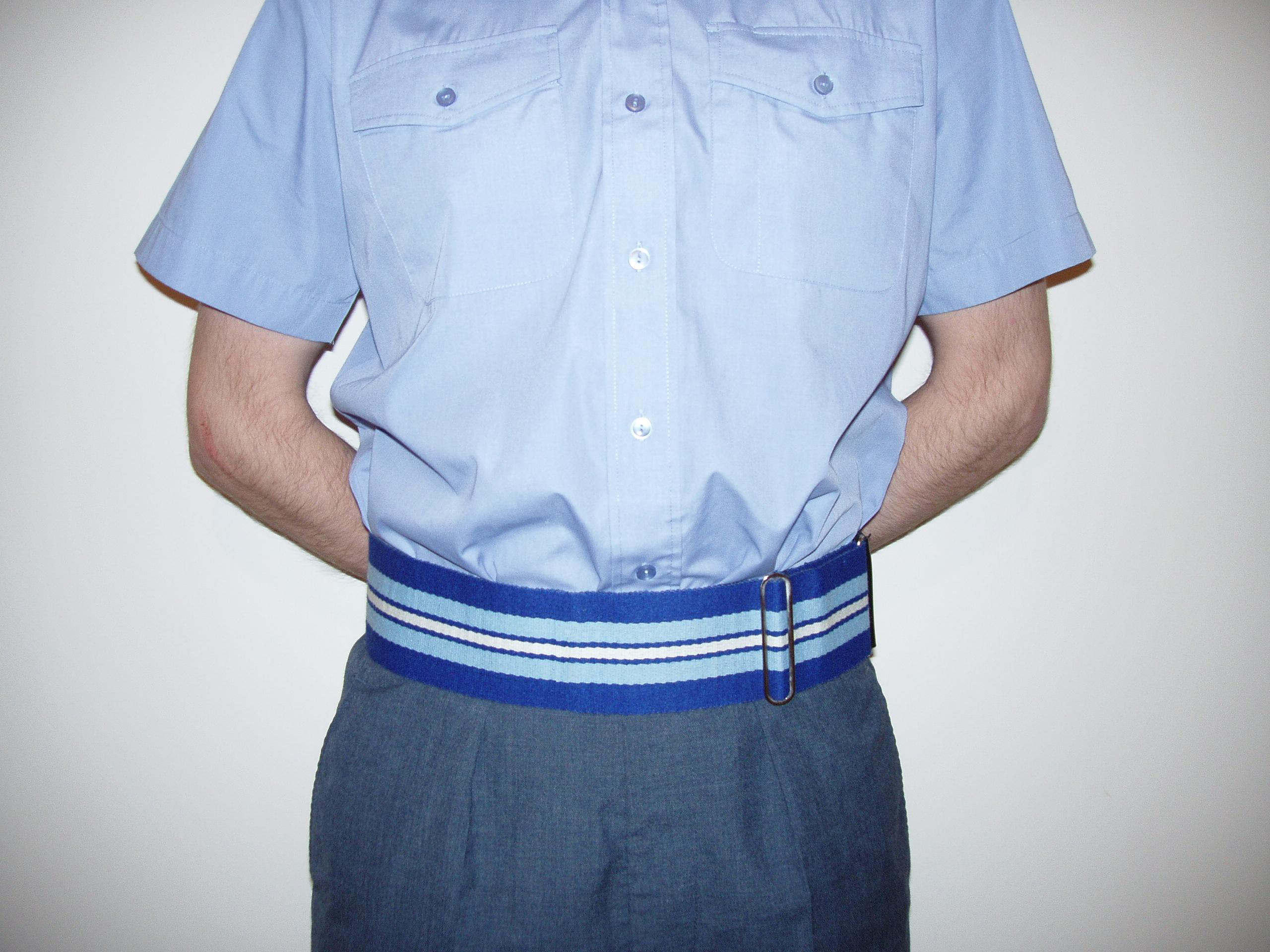
Horizontally striped, side fastening, Royal Observer Corps stable belt, (1995).

A stable belt is a wide webbing belt comprising a single solid colour or horizontally striped in two or more different colours. The original cavalry regiment stable belts buckled at the side using leather straps in order to both avoid chafing the wearer's stomach while undertaking stable work and avoid marking or catching upon the horse's harness. Many contemporary stable belts now secure at the front using a metal clip or metal plate bearing a regimental/service emblem. Whilst a limited number of army regiments, including the Light Infantry, secure their stable belts at the front using the original two leather straps, generally those belts fitted with leather straps are secured on the left-hand side.

The belt is worn around the waist and in the case of PCS is fitted through the trouser belt loops. In the British Army and Royal Marines, when worn with barrack dress, the belt is placed either through the belt loops of trousers or a skirt, or over a jersey. In the Royal Air Force (RAF), it is worn with service working dress (No. 2 dress) either covering the top of the trousers (or skirt) and the lower part of the shirt, or through the belt loops if able to accommodate the belt's width. Unlike the Army, the RAF do not wear the belt over the jersey. (The former Royal Observer Corps conformed to RAF dress regulations). Historically, the Royal Navy rarely wore stable belts unless working in a tri-service environment. However, these are now available as part of the new Royal Navy uniform RNPCS, replacing the old No. 4 Dress.

Stable belts are worn with most styles of informal dress, but not with full dress, service dress or mess dress. Every regiment and corps of the British Army has its own stable belt and, as is the case throughout the UK armed services, belts are not issued but purchased by individual service personnel at their own expense and are therefore optional items of uniform/equipment. However, their widespread use effectively renders them a standard uniform item.

The following belt patterns are shown in cross section, the stripes actually being horizontal as worn, and are actually considerably wider than shown, although the stripes are shown in correct proportion. Where belts are asymmetric, the left-hand side of the illustration is the uppermost as worn.

=== Cavalry/armoured regiments ===
Life Guards	Blues and Royals
1st The Queen's Dragoon Guards	Royal Scots Dragoon Guards	Royal Dragoon Guards
Queen's Royal Hussars	9th/12th Royal Lancers	King's Royal Hussars
Light Dragoons	Queen's Royal Lancers	Royal Tank Regiment
Royal Yeomanry	Royal Mercian and Lancastrian Yeomanry	Royal Wessex Yeomanry
Queen's Own Yeomanry

=== Infantry regiments (current) ===
Foot Guards	Royal Regiment of Scotland	Princess of Wales's Royal Regiment
Duke of Lancaster's Regiment	Royal Regiment of Fusiliers	Royal Anglian Regiment
Yorkshire Regiment	Mercian Regiment	Royal Welsh
Royal Irish Regiment	Parachute Regiment	Royal Gurkha Rifles
The Rifles	Special Air Service	Royal Gibraltar Regiment

=== Corps ===
Royal Horse Artillery	Royal Artillery	Royal Engineers
Royal Corps of Signals	Army Air Corps	Royal Army Chaplains' Department
Royal Logistic Corps	Royal Army Medical Corps	Royal Electrical and Mechanical Engineers
Adjutant General's Corps (Staff and Personnel Support)	Adjutant General's Corps (Royal Military Police)	Adjutant General's Corps (Military Provost Staff)
Adjutant General's Corps (Educational and Training Services)	Adjutant General's Corps (Army Legal Services)	Adjutant General's Corps (Military Provost Guard Service)
Royal Army Veterinary Corps	Small Arms School Corps	Royal Army Dental Corps
Intelligence Corps	Royal Army Physical Training Corps	Queen Alexandra's Royal Army Nursing Corps
Royal Corps of Army Music
Queen's Gurkha Engineers	Queen's Gurkha Signals	Queen's Own Gurkha Logistic Regiment
Honourable Artillery Company

=== Sub-units ===
1 Regiment RHA
4 Regiment RA	5 Regiment RA	29 Commando Regiment RA
B Battery RHA	E Battery RHA	F (Sphinx) Parachute Battery RHA
G Parachute Battery (Mercer's Troop) RHA	I Parachute Battery (Bull's Troop) RHA	K (Hondeghem) Battery RA
L (Néry) Battery RHA	N Battery (The Eagle Troop) RHA	O Battery (The Rocket Troop) RHA
P Battery (The Dragon Troop) RA	Q (Sanna's Post) Battery RA
4/73 (Sphinx) Special Observation Post Battery RA	38 (Seringapatam) Battery RA	46 (Talavera) Battery RA
53 (Louisburg) Battery RA	129 (Dragon) Battery RA
1 Squadron HAC	2 Squadron HAC	3 Squadron HAC
Training (formerly Signal) Squadron HAC	Corps of Drums HAC	A (1st City of London) Battery HAC

=== Training units ===
Royal Military Academy Sandhurst
Aberdeen Universities Officers Training Corps	Birmingham Universities Officers Training Corps	Bristol University Officers Training Corps
Cambridge University Officers Training Corps	City of Edinburgh Universities Officers Training Corps	East Midlands Universities Officer Training Corps
Hunting Stewart Tartan
Exeter University Officers Training Corps	Glasgow and Strathclyde Universities Officers Training Corps	Leeds University Officers Training Corps
Liverpool University Officers Training Corps	Manchester and Salford Universities Officers Training Corps	Northumbrian Universities Officers Training Corps
Oxford University Officers Training Corps	Queen's University Officers Training Corps	Sheffield University Officers Training Corps
Southampton University Officers Training Corps	Tayforth Universities Officers Training Corps	University of London Officers Training Corps
Hunting Stewart Tartan
University of Wales Officers Training Corps

=== Other services ===
Royal Navy	Royal Marines	Royal Air Force

=== Other organisations ===
First Aid Nursing Yeomanry	Royal Corps of Naval Constructors	Falkland Islands Defence Force

=== Youth cadet units ===
Sea Cadet Corps; Royal Navy Section, Combined Cadet Force	Sea Cadet Corps (Royal Marines); Royal Marines Section, Combined Cadet Force	Army Section, Combined Cadet Force
Army Cadet Force	Air Training Corps; RAF Section, Combined Cadet Force	Girls Venture Corps Air Cadets

=== Former cavalry regiments ===
Royal Horse Guards
1st King's Dragoon Guards	Queen's Bays (2nd Dragoon Guards)	3rd Carabiniers
4th/7th Royal Dragoon Guards	5th Royal Inniskilling Dragoon Guards
Royal Dragoons (1st Dragoons)	Royal Scots Greys (2nd Dragoons)	3rd The King's Own Hussars
4th Queen's Own Hussars	7th Queen's Own Hussars	8th King's Royal Irish Hussars
9th Queen's Royal Lancers	10th Royal Hussars	11th Hussars
12th Royal Lancers	13th/18th Royal Hussars	14th/20th King's Hussars
15th/19th The King's Royal Hussars	16th/5th The Queen's Royal Lancers	17th/21st Lancers
Queen's Own Hussars	Queen's Royal Irish Hussars	Royal Hussars
Queen's Royal Lancers (pre-1998)

=== Former Yeomanry regiments ===
Many of these belts are still worn by sub-units.

Ayrshire (Earl of Carrick's Own) Yeomanry	Bedfordshire Yeomanry	Berkshire and Westminster Dragoons
Berkshire Yeomanry	Cheshire Yeomanry	City of London Yeomanry (Rough Riders)
3rd/4th County of London Yeomanry (Sharpshooters)	Derbyshire Yeomanry	Duke of Lancaster's Own Yeomanry
East Riding Yeomanry	Essex Yeomanry	Fife and Forfar Yeomanry
Flintshire and Denbighshire Yeomanry	Glamorgan Yeomanry	Hampshire Yeomanry
Hertfordshire Yeomanry	Hertfordshire and Bedfordshire Yeomanry	Inns of Court Regiment
Inns of Court & City Yeomanry	Kent Yeomanry	Kent and Sharpshooters Yeomanry
Lanarkshire Yeomanry	Lancashire Hussars	Leicestershire Yeomanry
Leicestershire and Derbyshire Yeomanry	Lothians and Border Horse	Lovat Scouts
Middlesex Yeomanry	Norfolk Yeomanry	North Irish Horse
North Somerset Yeomanry	North Somerset and Bristol Yeomanry	Northamptonshire Yeomanry
Northumberland Hussars	Pembroke Yeomanry	Queen's Own Dorset Yeomanry
Queen's Own Dorset and West Somerset Yeomanry	Queen's Own Lowland Yeomanry	Queen's Own Mercian Yeomanry
Queen's Own Oxfordshire Hussars	Queen's Own Royal Glasgow Yeomanry	Queen's Own Warwickshire and Worcestershire Yeomanry
Queen's Own Worcestershire Hussars	Queen's Own Yorkshire Dragoons	Queen's Own Yorkshire Yeomanry
Royal Buckinghamshire Yeomanry	Royal Devon Yeomanry	Royal Gloucestershire Hussars
Royal Wiltshire Yeomanry	Scottish Horse	Scottish Yeomanry
Sherwood Rangers Yeomanry	Shropshire Yeomanry	South Nottinghamshire Hussars Yeomanry
Staffordshire Yeomanry	Staffordshire, Warwickshire and Worcestershire Yeomanry	Suffolk Yeomanry
Suffolk and Norfolk Yeomanry	Surrey Yeomanry	Sussex Yeomanry
Warwickshire Yeomanry	West Somerset Yeomanry	Westminster Dragoons
Yorkshire Hussars	Yorkshire Yeomanry	Fife and Forfar Yeomanry/Scottish Horse

=== Former infantry regiments ===
Argyll and Sutherland Highlanders	Bedfordshire and Hertfordshire Regiment	Black Watch
Border Regiment	The Buffs	The Cameronians
Douglas Tartan
Cheshire Regiment	Devonshire and Dorset Regiment	Devonshire Regiment
Dorset Regiment	Duke of Cornwall's Light Infantry	7th Duke of Edinburgh's Own Gurkha Rifles
Duke of Edinburgh's Royal Regiment	Duke of Wellington's Regiment	Durham Light Infantry
1st East Anglian Regiment	2nd East Anglian Regiment	3rd East Anglian Regiment
East Lancashire Regiment	East Surrey Regiment	East Yorkshire Regiment
Essex Regiment	Gloucestershire Regiment	Gordon Highlanders
Gordon Tartan
Green Howards	The Highlanders	Highland Light Infantry
Gordon Tartan
2nd King Edward VII's Own Gurkha Rifles	King's Own Royal Border Regiment	King's Own Royal Regiment
King's Own Scottish Borderers	King's Own Yorkshire Light Infantry	King's Regiment
Leslie Tartan
King's Regiment (Liverpool)	King's Royal Rifle Corps	King's Shropshire Light Infantry
Lancashire Fusiliers	Lancashire Regiment	The Light Infantry
Loyal Regiment	Manchester Regiment	Middlesex Regiment
Northamptonshire Regiment	North Staffordshire Regiment	Oxfordshire and Buckinghamshire Light Infantry
Prince of Wales's Own Regiment of Yorkshire	10th Princess Mary's Own Gurkha Rifles	6th Queen Elizabeth's Own Gurkha Rifles
Queen's Lancashire Regiment	Queen's Own Buffs	Queen's Own Cameron Highlanders
Queen's Own Highlanders	Queen's Own Royal West Kent Regiment	Queen's Regiment
MacKenzie Tartan
Queen's Royal Regiment (West Surrey)	Queen's Royal Surrey Regiment	The Rifle Brigade
Royal Berkshire Regiment	Royal Fusiliers	Royal Gloucestershire, Berkshire and Wiltshire Regiment
Royal Green Jackets	Royal Hampshire Regiment	Royal Highland Fusiliers
MacKenzie Tartan
Royal Inniskilling Fusiliers	Royal Irish Fusiliers	Royal Irish Rangers
Royal Leicestershire Regiment	Royal Lincolnshire Regiment	Royal Norfolk Regiment
Royal Northumberland Fusiliers	Royal Regiment of Wales	Royal Scots
Hunting Stewart Tartan
Royal Scots Fusiliers	Royal Sussex Regiment	Royal Ulster Rifles
Green Erskine Tartan
Royal Warwickshire Fusiliers	Royal Welch Fusiliers	Seaforth Highlanders
Sherwood Foresters	Somerset and Cornwall Light Infantry	Somerset Light Infantry
South Lancashire Regiment	South Staffordshire Regiment	South Wales Borderers
Staffordshire Regiment	Suffolk Regiment	Ulster Defence Regiment
Welch Regiment	West Yorkshire Regiment	Wiltshire Regiment
Worcestershire and Sherwood Foresters Regiment	Worcestershire Regiment	York and Lancaster Regiment

=== Former volunteer infantry regiments ===
These stable belts may still be worn by sub-units.

Cambridgeshire Regiment	Glasgow Highlanders	Herefordshire Light Infantry
1st Battalion, 51st Highland Volunteers	2nd Battalion, 51st Highland Volunteers	3rd Battalion, 51st Highland Volunteers
Lancastrian Volunteers	Leeds Rifles	Light Infantry and Mercian Volunteers
Liverpool Scottish	London Irish Rifles	London Regiment
London Rifle Brigade	London Scottish	1st Battalion, 52nd Lowland Volunteers
2nd Battalion, 52nd Lowland Volunteers	1st Battalion, Mercian Volunteers	2nd Battalion, Mercian Volunteers
Monmouthshire Regiment	North Irish Militia	Northumbrian Volunteers
Queen Victoria's Rifles	Queen's Westminsters	The Rangers
Suffolk and Cambridgeshire Regiment	Tower Hamlets Rifles	Tyneside Scottish
Welsh Volunteers	1st Battalion, Wessex Regiment	2nd Battalion, Wessex Regiment
1st Battalion, Yorkshire Volunteers	2nd Battalion, Yorkshire Volunteers	3rd Battalion, Yorkshire Volunteers
Princess Louise's Kensington Regiment

=== Former corps ===
Adjutant General's Corps (1st Pattern)	Army Catering Corps	Army Fire Service
Army Legal Corps	Military Provost Staff Corps	Royal Army Educational Corps
Royal Army Medical Corps (1st Pattern)	Royal Army Ordnance Corps (1st Pattern)	Royal Army Ordnance Corps (2nd Pattern)
Royal Army Pay Corps	Royal Army Service Corps	Royal Corps of Signals (1st Pattern)
Royal Corps of Transport	Royal Military Police	Royal Pioneer Corps
Women's Royal Army Corps
Gurkha Military Police	Queen's Own Gurkha Transport Regiment

=== Former sub-units ===
36 Guided Weapons Regiment RA; 47 Guided Weapons Regiment RA	95 Commando Regiment RA

=== Former training units ===
Welbeck College	Welbeck Defence Sixth Form College	Mons Officer Cadet School
Army Apprentices College, Arborfield	Army Apprentices College, Chepstow	Army Apprentices College, Harrogate
Junior Leaders Regiment, Royal Armoured Corps

=== Former civil defence organisations ===
Royal Observer Corps
