= Danish Artillery Regiment =

- Danske Artilleriregiment
- Coat of arms
- Active: 1 November 2005 – 28 February 2014; 1 January 2019 – present
- Country: Denmark
- Branch: Royal Danish Army
- Type: Artillery
- Part of: Army Staff
- Garrison/HQ: Varde Kaserne, Varde (-2014); Oksbøl Kaserne (2019-)
- Nickname: DAR
- Mottos: Officium Et Supra (Duty and a bit more)
- Mascot: Saint Barbara
- Anniversaries: Feast Day December 4
- Engagements: First Schleswig War; Battle of Nybøl; Battle of Fredericia; Battle of Isted; Battle of Mysunde (1848); Second Schleswig War; Battle of Mysunde (1864); Battle of Dybbøl
- Website: Official website

Insignia
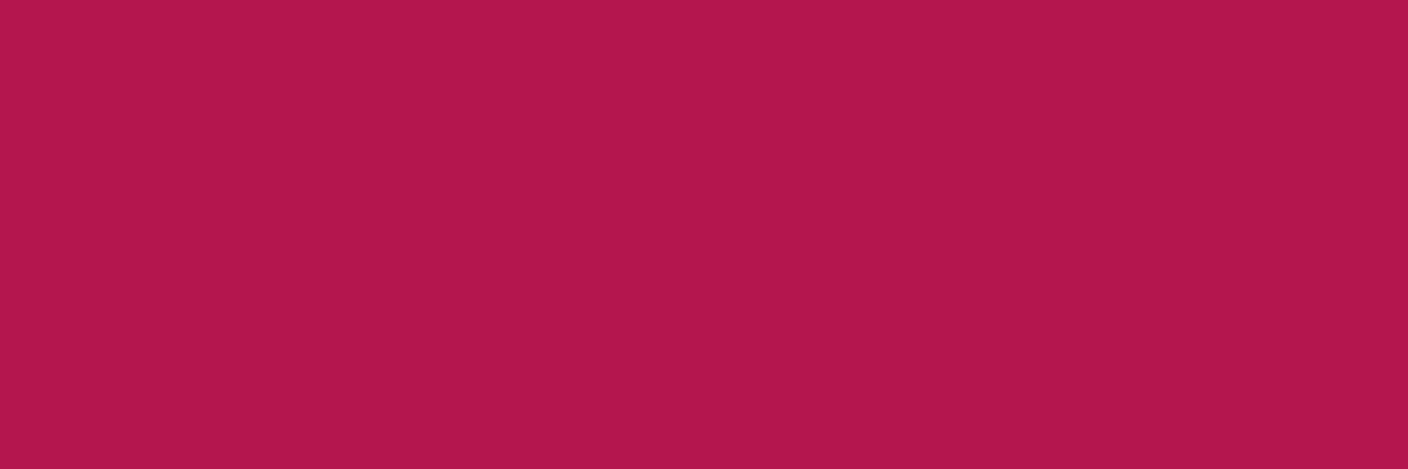
- Regimental belt

- Colours

The Danish Artillery Regiment (DAR, Danish: Danske Artilleriregiment) is an artillery unit of the Royal Danish Army, which was founded on 1 November 2005 when the two artillery regiments in Denmark, King's Artillery Regiment and Queen's Artillery Regiment were merged. The unit was disbanded in 2014 and revived in 2019.

== History ==
DAR was created administratively 1 August 2005 by merging the King's Artillery Regiment and the Queen's Artillery Regiment, with the official day creation as 1 November 2005. Danish Artillery Regiment (DAR) is Denmark's only remaining artillery regiment. The regiment was garrisoned in Varde and an artillery unit stationed in Oksbøl camp. From 2019, the revived regiment is stationed at Oksbøl Kaserne.

The regiment traces its history back to 1684 when The Royal Artillery Corps was established in Copenhagen. In 1803 the Artillery Corps divided into three brigades; referred to as "Danish Artillery Brigade", "Holstein Artillery Brigade" and "Norwegian Artillery Brigade". The latter was dissolved in 1814 with the loss of Norway. In 1842 the brigades changed to 1st Artillery Regiment (Danish) and 2nd Artillery Regiment (Holstein), respectively, but was overall called "The Royal Artillery Brigade". In connection with the Second Schleswig War between Denmark and Prussia, the second Artillery Regiment (Holstein) was dissolved, in March 1848, when the regiment joined the rebels.

Following Hærloven of 1867, the Second Artillery Regiment was restored by taking 7th-9th Battery and 12. Reinforcement Battery and 2. Train Department from 1st Artillery Regiment.

In 1895 Fortress Artillery Regiment was established, which was responsible for Copenhagen fortress artillery. This regiment was disbanded in 1920 when the Danish government admitted that there was no need for a permanent fortification around the capital. In 1909 Coastal Artillery Regiment was created.

In 1932, the responsibility for coastal artillery moved from the Army to the Navy, and thus abolished Coastal artillery as an artillery unit.

In 1951, the artillery was organized as follows:

- 1st Field Artillery Regiment (Crown Artillery Regiment) in Sjælsmark
- 2nd Field Artillery Regiment (Zealand Artillery Regiment) in Holbæk
- 3rd Field Artillery Regiment (Nørrejyske Artillery Regiment) in Aarhus
- 4th Field Artillery Regiment (Southern Jutland Artillery Regiment) in Varde
- Zealand Air Defence Regiment in Copenhagen
- Jutlandic Air Defence Regiment in Aalborg
- 12th Artillery Division on Bornholm
- Artillery Shooting School in Copenhagen (Artillery School)
- Artillery Commander School in Ringsted.

In 2014, as part of the Danish Defence Agreement 2013-2017, DAR was disbanded and reformed into Army Combat and Fire Support Center and 1st Danish Artillery Battalion (1DAA), with the later set to carry on the traditions and history of DAR.

In 2019, the regiment was revived along with Schleswig Regiment of Foot.

== Structure ==
Today the Danish Artillery Regiment has four battalions:

- 1st Artillery Battalion
  - Staff platoon
  - 1st Fire Support Battery (Army's Flank Battery)
  - 2nd Fire Support Battery (Nybøl Battery)
  - 3rd Fire Support Battery (Bardenfelth Battery)
- 2nd Combat Capacity Battalion
  - 1st Training Battery (Mysunde Battery)
  - 4th Antiaircraft Battery
  - 5th Artillery Training Battery (Dinesen Battery)
  - Combat and simulation section (KAMPSIM)
- 3rd Safety and Ballistics Battalion
  - Direct Fire Section (DSV)
  - Indirect Fire Section (ISV)
  - Shooting range inspectorate (SKBI)
- 5th Reserve Battalion
  - reactivated in 2019 as a battalion for reservists (no batteries attached)

== Amalgamation of Danish artillery regiments ==
In 1970 the Crown Artillery Regiment and the Zealand Air Defence Regiment merged, continuing as the Crown Artillery Regiment. In 1974 Nørrejyske Artillery Regiment and Jyske Air Defence Regiment merged, continuing as the Nørrejyske Artillery Regiment.

In 1982 the Crown Artillery Regiment and the Zealand Artillery Regiment was merged and reformed into the King's Artillery Regiment. In 2000 Nørrejyske Artillery Regiment and Sønderjyske Artillery Regiment was merged and reformed into the Queen Artillery Regiment. Finally, the two remaining artillery regiments amalgamated d. August 1, 2005 to the Danish Artillery Regiment, and thus all artillery was again in one unit.

1951	1961	1970	1974	1982	2000	2005-2014, 2019-
1st Field Artillery Regiment	Crown's Artillery Regiment	Crown's Artillery Regiment		King's Artillery Regiment		Danish Artillery Regiment
Zealand Air Defence Regiment		Crown's Artillery Regiment		King's Artillery Regiment		Danish Artillery Regiment
2nd Field Artillery Regiment	Zealand Artillery Regiment			King's Artillery Regiment		Danish Artillery Regiment
3rd Field Artillery Regiment	North Jutland Artillery Regiment		North Jutland Artillery Regiment		Queen's Artillery Regiment	Danish Artillery Regiment
Jutlandic Air Defence Regiment			North Jutland Artillery Regiment		Queen's Artillery Regiment	Danish Artillery Regiment
4th Field Artillery Regiment	Southern Jutland Artillery Regiment				Queen's Artillery Regiment	Danish Artillery Regiment
