= Zealand Artillery Regiment =

Artillery regiment of the Royal Danish Army

- Sjællandske Artilleriregiment
- Active: 1961
- Disbanded: August 1, 1982
- Country: Denmark
- Branch: Royal Danish Army
- Part of: Army Operational Command

The Zealand Artillery Regiment (Danish: Sjællandske Artilleriregiment) was an artillery regiment of the Royal Danish Army. On 1 August 1982 it was merged with Kronens Artilleriregiment to form Kongens Artilleriregiment.

== History ==
In 1803 the Danish artillery corps was split into three Brigades, Holstenske Artilleribrigade, Danske Artilleribrigade and Norske Artilleribrigade (disbanded in 1814). The Regiment traces its history back to Holstenske Artilleribrigade. In the First Schleswig War the Regiment (then named 2. Artilleriregiment) participated on the Schleswig-Holstein side and was afterwards disbanded.

== Units ==
- 4th Rocket Artillery Battalion (1961-1976)
- 5th Armoured Artillery Battalion (1961-1982)
- 21st Light Artillery Battalion (1961-1982)
- 22nd Light Artillery Battalion (1961-1982)
- 32nd Heavy Artillery Battalion (1961-1982)

== Names of the regiment ==
Names
Holstenske Artilleribrigade	Holstein's Artillery Brigade	1803	–	1842
2. Artilleriregiment	2nd Artillery Regiment	1842	–	1848
Disbanded	Disbanded	1848	–	1852
2. Artilleriregiment	2nd Artillery Regiment	1852	–	1865
Artilleriregiment	Artillery Regiment	1865	–	1867
2. Artilleriregiment	2nd Artillery Regiment	1867	–	1909
2. Feltartilleriregiment	2nd Field Artillery Regiment	1909	–	1961
Sjællandske Artilleriregiment	Zealand Artillery Regiment	1961	–	1982
