= Jutland Air Defence Regiment =

Jutlandic Air Defence Regiment
- Jyske Luftværnsregiment
- Coat of arms
- Active: 1951−1974 (22 years)
- Country: Denmark
- Branch: Royal Danish Army
- Type: Anti-Air
- Role: Air Defence
- Part of: Hærens Operative Kommando
- Garrison/HQ: Ålborg, from 1961 Tønder.
- Nickname: JLVR
- Motto: Suspicite Caelum (Look Up At the Sky)
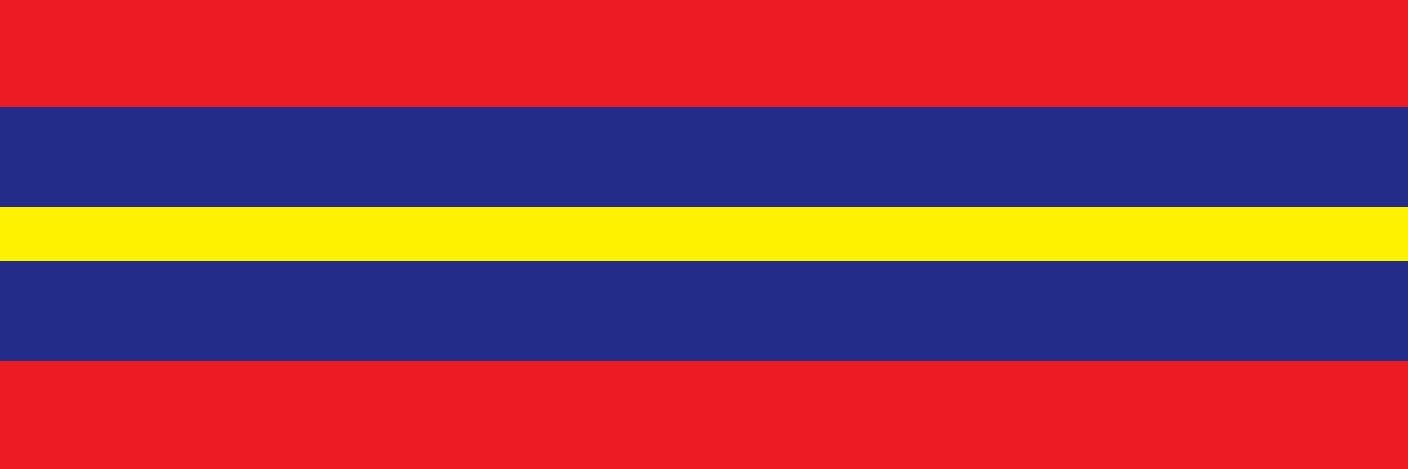
- Regimental belt
- March: Luftværnsregimentets Honnørmarch
- Mascot: Saint Barbara

The Jutlandic Air Defence Regiment (Danish: Jyske Luftværnsregiment) was a Danish Army Air defence regiment. On 1 November 1974 it was merged into North Jutland Artillery Regiment.

== History ==
The regiment was established on 3 November 1951. When 14 AA were separated from Zealand Air Defence Regiment.

The regiment traces its history even further back, through Zealand Air Defence Regiment, as it is heir to the old Kystartilleriregimentet.

== Structure ==
- 2nd Air Defence Battalion
- 3nd Air Defence Battalion
- 14th Air Defence Battalion, Part of Jutland Division

== Names of the regiment ==
Names
Jyske Luftværnsregiment	Jutlandic Air Defence Regiment	1951	–	1974
