= Holbæk Barracks =

Coordinates: 55.7144°N 11.7248°E

Holbæk Barracks (Danish: Holbæk Kaserne) is a former military facility from 1913 located in Holbæk, Denmark. The buildings have now been converted into housing, offices and facilities for local associations. Two buildings, Ridehuset (The Equestrian House) and Eksercerhuset (The Drill House), were listed in 2004.

== History ==
Holbæk Barracks was one of a series of military facilities on the island of Zealand that was created as a result of the Danish Army Act of 1909 (Hærloven). Among the others were the barracks in Ringsted, Slagelse and Vordingborg. The buildings were designed by Olaf Petri and Egil Fischer. Construction began in 1912 and it was inaugurated in 1913. It housed infantry and artillery troops. Kostforplejningen was built in 1939 and a new garage complex was built in 1951-52,

The barracks were decommissioned as a result of the Defence Agreement of 1980. The artillery regiment was merged with Sjælsmark Artillery Regiment in 1982. Some of their buildings were taken over by the local department of the Home Guard. They moved out in 2010. The Infantry Barracks were converted into housing. A number of the other buildings were taken over by Holbæk Municipality, including the Commander's House (Kommandantbygningen), the guardhouse, the Equestrian House (Ridehuset), the Drill House (Eksercerhuset), the Exercise House (Gymnastikhuset) and Kostforplejningen. The garage complex was demolished in 2004 and the area known as "Lille Fælled" was subsequently redeveloped. The Home Guard left moved out in 2010. Ridehuset and Eksercerhuset were listed in 2004.
