= Crown's Artillery Regiment =

Crown Artillery Regiment
- Kronens Artilleriregiment
- Active: 1961–1 August 1982
- Country: Denmark
- Branch: Royal Danish Army
- Type: Artillery
- Part of: Hærens Operative Kommando
- Mottos: Frisk og Frejdigt Fremad (Fresh and Boldly Forward)
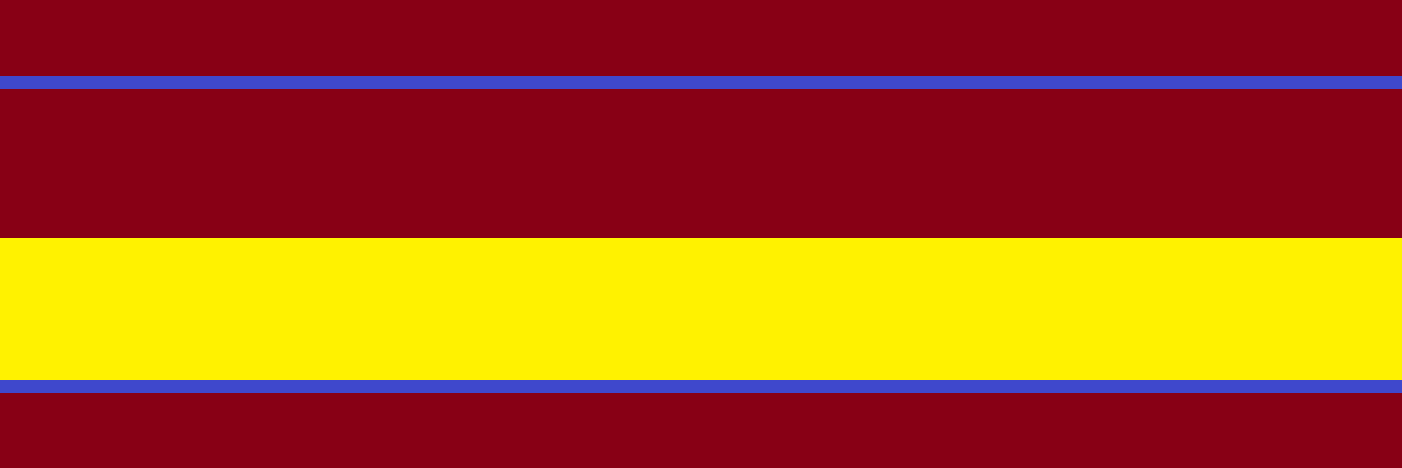
- Regimental belt
- Mascot: Saint Barbara
- Anniversaries: Feast Day December 4

The Crown Artillery Regiment (Danish: Kronens Artilleriregiment) was an artillery regiment of the Royal Danish Army. On 1 August 1982 it was merged with the Zealand Artillery Regiment to form the King's Artillery Regiment.

== History ==
In 1684 three artillery corps were formed, Danske Artillerikorps, Holstenske Artillerikorps and Norske Artillerikorps. They were merged in 1764 to one corps, Det kongelige Artillerikorps. Kronens Artilleriregiment traces its origin back to this corps. In 1803 it was split up into three brigades, Danske Artilleribrigade, Holstenske Artilleribrigade (the later Zealand Artillery Regiment) and Norske Artilleribrigade (disbanded in 1814).

== Unit ==
- 1st Armoured Artillery Battalion (1961-1982)
- 2nd Artillery Battalion (1961-1982)
- 14th Light Artillery Battalion (1961-1982)
- 16th Light Artillery Battalion (1974-1982)
- 1st Anti Air Artillery Battalion (1970-1974)
- 13th Anti Air Artillery Battalion (1970-1982)

== Names of the regiment ==
Names
Det kongelige Artillerikorps	The Royal Artillery Corps	1764	–	1803
Danske Artilleribrigade	Danish Artillery Brigade	1803	–	1842
1. Artilleriregiment	1st Artillery Regiment	1842	–	1865
Artilleriregimentet	Artillery Regiment	1865	–	1867
1. Artilleriregiment	1st Artillery Regiment	1867	–	1909
1. Feltartilleriregiment	1st Field Artillery Regiment	1909	–	1961
Kronens Artilleriregiment	Crown's Artillery Regiment	1961	–	1982
