= King's Artillery Regiment =

- Kongens Artilleriregiment
- Active: 1982 – 2005
- Disbanded: 2005
- Country: Denmark
- Branch: Royal Danish Army
- Garrison/HQ: Sjælsmark kaserne
- Nickname: KAR
- Mottos: Frisk og Frejdigt Fremad (Fresh and Boldly Forward)
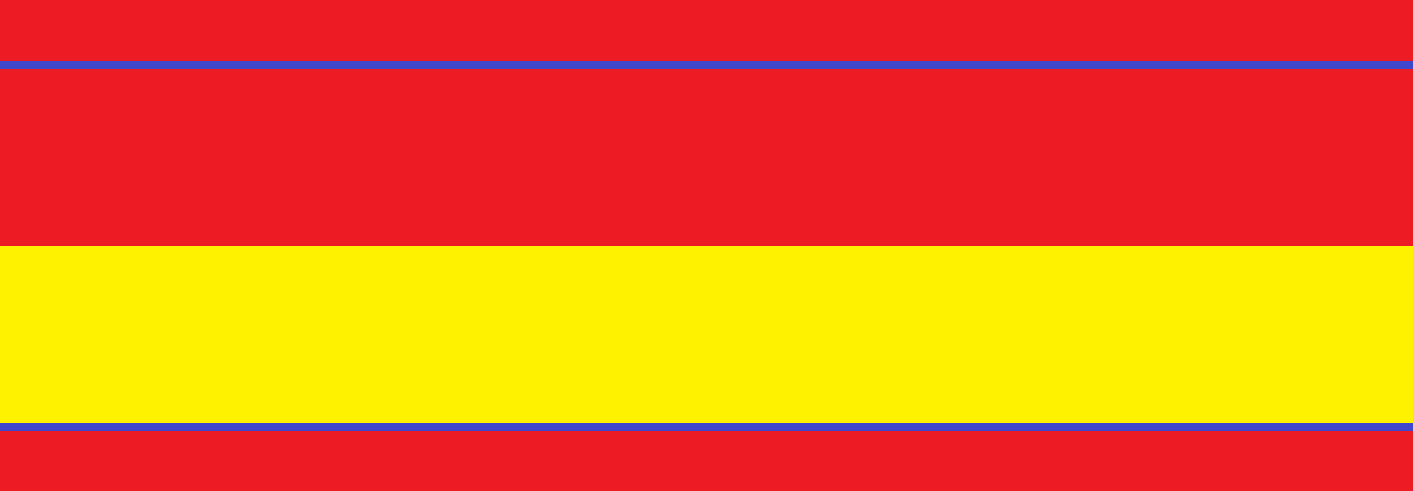
- Regimental belt

The King's Artillery Regiment (Danish: Kongens Artilleriregiment, KAR) was an artillery regiment of the Royal Danish Army.

== History ==
The Kongens Artilleriregiment was formed on 1 August 1982 by merging the Crown's Artillery Regiment (Kronens Artilleriregiment) from Sjælsmark barracks and the Zealand Artillery Regiment (Sjællandske Artilleriregiment) from Holbæk barracks. On 1 November 2005 Kongens Artilleriregiment was merged with the Queen's Artillery Regiment (Dronningens Artilleriregiment) to create the new artillery regiment, Danish Artillery Regiment (Danske Artilleriregiment). The regiment was located on Sjælsmark barracks.

== Units ==
- 1st Armoured Artillery Battalion (1982-2004) part of 1st Zealand Brigade
- 2nd Artillery Battalion (1982-2004) part of ELK/Corps Artillery
- 4th Light Artillery Battalion (1982-1996) part of 4th Zealand Battle Group,(from 1990)1st Zealand Battle Group
- 5th Armoured Artillery Battalion (1982-2004) part of 2nd Zealand Brigade (from 1994 part of Danish International Brigade)
- 13th Anti Air Artillery Battalion (1982-2000) part of LANDZEALAND/Corps Artillery
- 14th Light Artillery Battalion (1982-1985) part of LANDZEALAND/Corps Artillery
- 16th Light Artillery Battalion (1982-1990) part of 1st Zealand Battle Group. Transferred to North Jutland Artillery Regiment
- 17th Heavy Artillery Battery (1985-1996) - 17th MLRS Battery (1997-2004) part of LANDZEALAND/Corps Artillery
- 21st Light Artillery Battalion (1982-2000) part of 3rd Zealand Battle Group
- 22nd Light Artillery Battalion (1982-2000) part of 2nd Zealand Battle Group
- 32nd Heavy Artillery Battalion (1982-1985) - 32nd Artillery Battalion (1986-2000) part of LANDZEALAND/Corps Artillery, (2000-2004) part of HOK
- Staff and Target Acquisition Battery/LANDZEALAND (1982-2004) part of LANDZEALAND/Corps Artillery
