= Danish International Logistic Center =

Danish International Logistical Center
- Danske Internationale Logistik Center
- Cap badge of DANILOG
- Active: 1 January 2001 - 3 March 2014
- Country: Denmark
- Branch: Royal Danish Army
- Part of: Hærens Operative Kommando
- Garrison/HQ: Vordingborg Kaserne, Vordingborg
- Nickname: DANILOG
- Mottos: Stærk og sej (Strong and Tough)
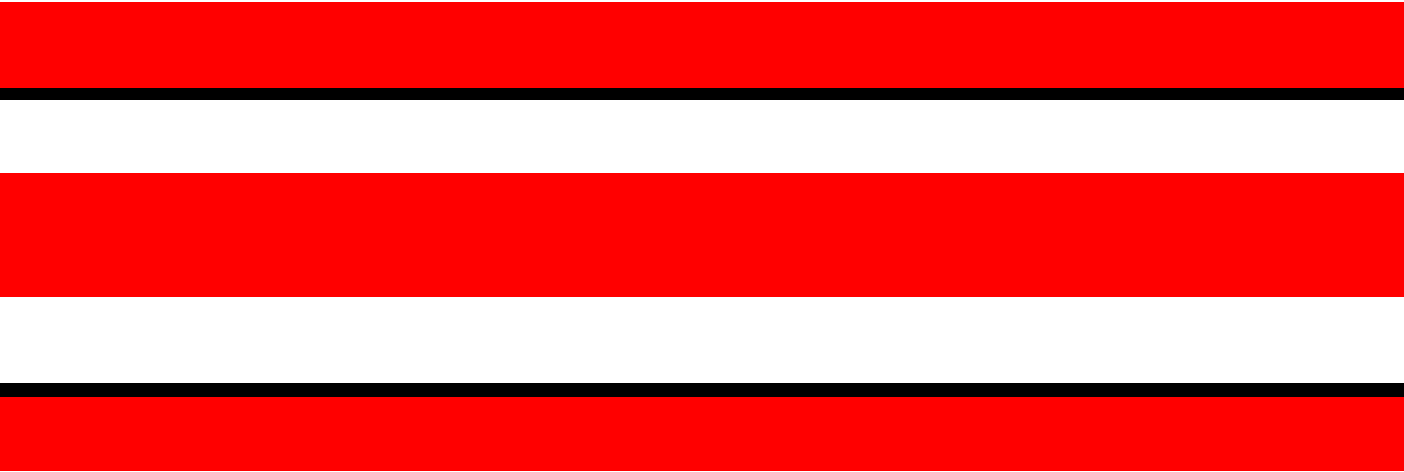
- Stable belt

Commanders
- Ceremonial chief: HM The Queen of Denmark
- Colonel of the Regiment: P.L.Hinrichsen

The Danish International Logistical Center (DANILOG) was established in 2001 as a regimental-level logistics unit that is part of the Danish Army Operational Command. It was based out of Vordingborg Kaserne.

DANILOG was part of Denmark's efforts to provide better administrative and logistical support to its personnel deployed abroad as part of humanitarian operations such as Implementation Force (IFOR), United Nations Protection Force (UNPROFOR) and United Nations Mission in Ethiopia and Eritrea (UNMEE), as well as combat environments such as the Danish Contingent/Iraq (Dancon).

IFOR is a NATO-led multinational force in Bosnia and Herzegovina. UNPROFOR is the first UN peacekeeping force in Croatia and Bosnia and Herzegovina during the Yugoslavian civil war. UNMEE was established in July 2000 to monitor a ceasefire in the border war that began in 1998 between Ethiopia and Eritrea. DANILOG also supported combat environments like the Iraq theater of operations.

== Bibliography ==
- Jakobsen, Peter Viggo (2006). Nordic Approaches to Peace Operations: A New Model in the Making?. Taylor & Francis US. p. 259. ISBN 0-415-38360-9.
