= Army Operational Command (Denmark) =

- Hærens Operative Kommando
- Coat of Arms of HOK
- Active: 1 January 1991 - 1 October 2014
- Country: Denmark
- Branch: Royal Danish Army
- Size: 190 civilian & military
- Part of: Ministry of Defence
- Headquarters: Karup
- Nickname: HOK
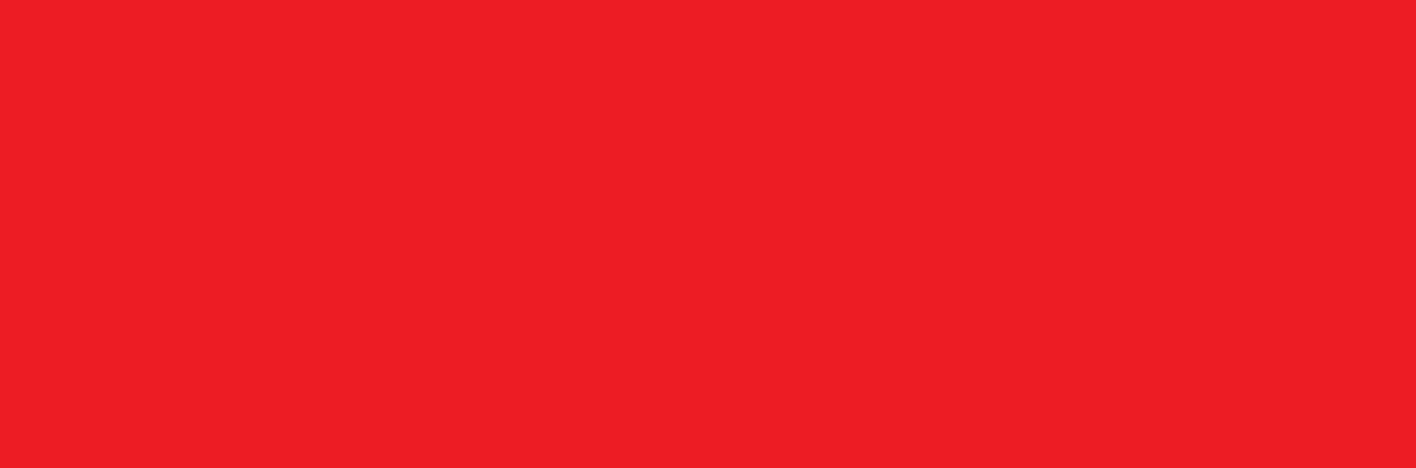
- Stable belt

Commanders
- Chief HOK: Major General Poul Kiærskou

Army Operational Command (Danish: Hærens Operative Kommando), short "HOK", was the Danish Army's top authority. It is a Level.II command authority, directly under the Defence Command. HOK was formed on 1 January 1991.

The origin of HOK can be traced back to 1808, with the forming of the General staff. Initially located in Aarhus, 1 August 1993 it had its headquarters in Karup, Denmark.

Due to the recent Defence agreement 2005-2009 many changes are currently in the process of being implemented, so the following subordinated list might not be fully complete or fully accurate. Directly subordinated is the following Level.III authorities.

== Subordinated Level.III authorities ==
- Danish Division (DDIV)
- 1.Brigade
- 2.Brigade
- Danish Operative Logistical Group (DANOPLOG)
- Local defence region - Bornholm Defence (LFR BV)
- Jægerkorpset (JGK)

=== Regiments ===
- Den Kongelige Livgarde (LG)
- Jydske Dragonregiment (JDR)
- Gardehusarregimentet (GHR)
- Ingeniørregimentet (IGR)
- Telegrafregimentet (TGR)
- Trænregimentet (TRR)
- Danske Artilleriregiment (DAR)

=== Schools ===
- Army Officers Academy (HO)
- Army Combat School (HKS)
- Army Artillery School (HILS)
- Army Engineer & ABC School (HIAS)
- Army Signal School
- Army Logistical School (HLS)
- Army Sergeant School (HSGS)

=== Camps ===
- Borrislejren
- Oksbøllejren
- Jægersprislejren

== Recent disbanded structures (since 2000) ==
- 1.Jutland Brigade (1.JBDE) 1961-2004
- 2.Jutland Brigade (2.JBDE) 1961-1996
- 3.Jutland Brigade (3.JBDE) 1961-2004
- 1.Zealand Brigade (1.SBDE) 1961-2004
- 2.Zealand Brigade (2.SBDE) 1961-1994
- 3.Zealand Brigade (3.SBDE) 1961-1974
- Danish International Brigade (DIB) 1994-2005
- 1.Zealand Combat group(1.SKG) 1983-1996
- 2.Zealand Combat group(2.SKG) 1983-2000
- 3.Zealand Combat group(3.SKG) 1983-1996
- 4.Zealand Combat group(4.SKG) 1983-1990
- Zealand Combat group(SKG) 2000-2004
- Jutland Combat group (JKG) 1983-2004
- 4.Combat group (4.KG) 1991-1996
- Danish Division Combat group 2000-2004
- Nørrejyske Artilleriregiment (NJAR)
- Sønderjydske Artilleriregiment (SJAR)
- Dronningens Livregiment (DRLR)
- Slesvigske Fodregiment (SLFR)
- Danske Livregiment (DLR)
- Sjællandske Livregiment (SLR)
- Prinsens Livregiment (PLR)
- Kongens Artilleriregiment (KAR)
- Dronningens Artilleriregiment (DAR)
- Danish International Logistical Center (DANILOG)
- Danske Artilleriregiment (DAR)

== Previous disbanded structures (since 1995) ==
- Jutland Division (JDIV)
- 2.Zealand Brigade (2.JBDE)
- 2.Jutland Brigade (2.JBDE)
- Sjællandske Ingeniørregiment
- Jyske Ingeniørregiment
- Sjællandske Trænregiment
- Jyske Trænregiment
