= List of Danish full admirals =

This is a list of full admirals in the Royal Danish Navy. The rank of admiral (or full admiral to distinguish it from the lower admiral ranks) is the highest rank currently achievable by serving officers. It ranks above vice admiral and was previously itself below Lieutenant general admiral.

Persons listed are shown with the rank of full admiral. Those who only held the rank of full admiral on an acting basis are not shown.

== List of admirals ==
=== 1500 ===
Portrait	Name (birth–death)	Appointed	Ref.
	Tile Giseler (?–c. 1532)	1523	
	Peder Skram (?–1581)		
	Herluf Trolle (1516–1565)	1559	

=== 1600 ===
Portrait	Name (birth–death)	Appointed	Ref.
	Ove Gjedde (1594–1660)	17 January 1644	
	Køn Joachim Grabow (?–1667)	17 September 1652	
	Henrik Bielke (1615–1683)	13 August 1653	
	Niels Juel (1629–1697)	14 June 1657	
	Cort Adeler (1622–1675)	15 September 1663	
	Jens Rodsteen (1633–1706)	4 May 1675	
	Markor Rodsteen (1625–1681)	14 May 1675	
	Christian Bielke (1645–1694)	2 January 1682	
	Henrik Span (1634–1694)	2 January 1682	
	Ulrik Christian Gyldenløve, Count of Samsø (1678–1719)	21 November 1695	
	Frederik Giedde (1641–1717)	29 December 1697	
	Mathias von Paulsen (?–1710)	30 December 1697	
	Christopher Ernst von Stöcken (1664–1711)	31 December 1697	

=== 1700 ===
Portrait	Name (birth–death)	Appointed	Ref.
	Niels Lauitzen Barfoed (1650–1730)	29 June 1714	
	Peter Raben (c. 1661–1727)	29 June 1714	
	Knud Reedtz (1663–1734)	29 June 1714	
	Christen Thomesen Sehested (1664–1736)	1 October 1715	
	Ole Judichær (1661–1729)	16 April 1718	
	Frantz Petersen Trojel (1666–1731)	30 December 1719	
	Andreas Rosenpalm (1679–1754)	13 October 1727	
	Ulrich Kaas (1677–1746)	20 February 1732	
	Michael Bille (1680–1756)	20 January 1734	
	Wiglas von Schindel (1684–1756)	7 May 1735	
	Ulrik Frederik Suhm (1686–1758)	27 April 1742	
	Seneca Hagedorn (1681–1750)	4 September 1747 (À la suite)	
	Frederik Hoppe (1690–1776)	11 October 1752	
	Gaspard Frédéric le Sage de Fontenay (1693–1769)	18 August 1759	
	Lensgreve; Christian Conrad Danneskiold-Laurvig (1723–1783)	28 October 1767	
	Hans Henrik Rømeling (1707–1775)	20 January 1772	
	Frederik Christian Kaas (1725–1803)	30 November 1775	
	Samuel Hooglant (1712–1789)	17 June 1782	
	Henrik Fisker (1720–1797)	24 September 1790	
	Carl Frederik le Sage de Fontenay (1723–1799)	24 September 1790	
	Conrad von Schindel (1715–1794)	24 September 1790	

=== 1800 ===
Portrait	Name (birth–death)	Appointed	Ref.
	Frederik Christian Kaas (1727–1804)	24 December 1800	
	Ulrik Christian Kaas (1729–1808)	6 April 1804	
	Jørgen Balthazar Winterfeldt (1732–1821)	6 April 1804	
	Johan Peter Wleugel (1766–1835)	28 January 1812	
	Otto Lütken (1749–1835)	4 January 1825	
	Steen Andersen Bille (1751–1833)	1 January 1829	
	Hans Holsten (1758–1849)	23 December 1835	
	Ulrich Anton Schønheyder (1775–1858)	3 August 1851 (À la suite)	
	George I of Greece (1845–1913)	11 September 1863 (Honorary)	
	Carl van Dockum (1804–1893)	4 June 1868	
	Oscar II of Sweden (1829–1907)	12 December 1872 (Honorary)	
	Jørgen Peter Frederik Wulff (1808–1881)	1 July 1873 (À la suite)	
	Frederik Laurentius Fiedler Sommer (1813–1878)	1 June 1874	
	Johan Ludvig Gottlieb (1809–1886)	1 December 1874 (À la suite)	
	Gerhard Frederik Wilhelm Wrisberg (1816–1896)	24 July 1878	
	August Christian Schultz (1813–1908)	8 March 1879 (À la suite)	

=== 1900 ===
Portrait	Name (birth–death)	Appointed	Ref.
	Wilhelm II of Germany (1859–1941)	2 April 1903 (Honorary)	
	Haakon VII of Norway (1872–1957)	20 November 1905 (Honorary)	
	Frederick VIII of Denmark (1843–1912)	29 January 1906	
	Nicholas II of Russia (1868–1918)	15 July 1909 (Honorary)	
	George V of the United Kingdom (1865–1936)	24 Maj 1910 (Honorary)	
	Christian X of Denmark (1870–1947)	15 May 1912	
	Prince Valdemar of Denmark (1858–1939)	8 April 1918 (Honorary)	
	Edward VIII of the United Kingdom (1894–1972)	29 January 1936 (Honorary)	
	Frederik IX of Denmark (1899–1972)	20 April 1947	
	Prince George of Greece and Denmark (1869–1957)	24 June 1949 (Honorary)	
	Erhard J.C. Qvistgaard (1898–1980)	1 October 1950	
	Prince Axel of Denmark (1888–1964)	29 January 1958 (Honorary)	
	Knud, Hereditary Prince of Denmark (1900–1976)	1 August 1965 (Honorary)	
	Henrik, Prince Consort of Denmark (1967–2018)	1981 (Honorary)	
	Sven Eigil Thiede (1924–2005)	1 December 1985	
	Hans Jørgen Garde (1939–1996)	1 April 1996	

=== 2000 ===
Portrait	Name (birth–death)	Appointed	Ref.
	Tim Sloth Jørgensen (born 1951)	1 August 2008	
	Frederik X of Denmark (born 1968)	14 January 2024	

== See also ==
- Admiral (Denmark)
- List of Danish vice admirals
- List of Danish full generals
