= List of Danish vice admirals =

This is a list of vice admirals in the Royal Danish Navy. The rank of vice admiral is the second highest rank currently achievable by serving officers. It ranks above counter admiral and below admiral.

Persons listed are shown with the rank of vice admiral. Those who only held the rank of vice admiral on an acting basis are not shown.

== List of vice admirals ==
=== 1600 ===
Portrait	Name (birth–death)	Appointed	Ref.
	Jørgen Biørnsen (1596–1680)	1 May 1651	
	Nicolaj Helt (?–1667)	1656	
	Peter Bredal (c. 1630–1658)	20 July 1658	
	Iver Hoppe (1649–1693)	1 July 1684	
	Cornelius de Witt (?–?)	7 October 1684	

=== 1700 ===
Portrait	Name (birth–death)	Appointed	Ref.
	Just Juel (1664–1715)	5 March 1712	
	Christian Carl Gabel (1679–1748)	15 May 1715	
	Peter Wessel Tordenskiold (1690–1720)	17 August 1719	
	Johan Anthon von Paulsen (1687–1736)	10 November 1727	
	Christian Koningh (1677–1749)	26 September 1736	
	Rasmus Krag (1680–1755)	26 September 1736	
	Hans Jacob Rostgaard (1685–1756)	28 October 1746	
	Vilhelm Lemvig (1690–1768)	4 September 1747 (À la suite)	
	Caspar von Wessel (1693–1768)	4 September 1747 (À la suite)	
	Johan Conrad Wodroff (1690–1747)	4 September 1747	
	Michael Christian Tønder (1692–1755)	11 October 1752	
	Olfert Fasvier Fischer (1700–1761)	7 September 1758	
	Christian Carl von Basballe (1732–1783)	29 May 1765	
	Jørgen Torbiørnsen (1698–1771)	22 July 1769	
	Friderich Zimmer (1702–1774)	30 September 1772	
	Johan Cornelius Krieger (1725–1797)	31 July 1790	
	Ole Stephansen (1714–1791)	24 September 1790	
	Andreas Lous (1728–1797)	23 December 1796 (À la suite)	
	Adam Gottlob Ferdinand Moltke (1748–1820)	22 December 1797 (À la suite)	

=== 1800 ===
Portrait	Name (birth–death)	Appointed	Ref.
	William Walker Stockfleth (1737–1818)	6 April 1804	
	Anton Frederik Lützow (1744–1819)	28 January 1817	
	Jens Schou Fabricius (1758–1841)	23 August 1821	
	Olfert Fischer (1747–1829)	4 January 1825	
	Adolph Tobias Herbst (1746–1825)	4 January 1825	
	Jost van Dockum (1753–1834)	16 April 1833	
	Peter Caspar Wessel Brown (1755–1840)	20 July 1834 (À la suite)	
	Frederik Christian Riisbrigh (1754–1835)	1 August 1834 (À la suite)	
	Johan Johnsen (1765–1847)	25 December 1835	
	Hans Stephensen (1773–1851)	29 March 1848	
	Jens Peter Stibolt (1774–1860)	19 October 1848 (À la suite)	
	Andreas Schifter (1779–1852)	3 August 1851	
	Christian Christopher Zahrtmann (1793–1853)	2 April 1852	
	Conrad Emil Mourier (1795–1865)	1 April 1853	
	Johan Anton Meyer (1799–1875)	28 February 1860	
	Jens Seidelin (1790–1863)	30 March 1863 (À la suite)	
	Steen Andersen Bille (1797–1883)	18 January 1864	
	Edouard Suenson (1805–1887)	5 August 1880 (À la suite)	
	Carl Irminger (1802–1888)	5 August 1880 (À la suite)	
	Julius Meldal (1827–1901)	21 February 1886	
	Niels Frederik Ravn (1826–1910)	8 July 1891 (À la suite)	
	Hans Henrik Koch (1836–1903)	19 July 1897	
	Fritz Peter Adolph Uldall (1835–1911)	2 January 1899	

=== 1900 ===
Portrait	Name (birth–death)	Appointed	Ref.
	Carl Frederik Wandel (1843–1930)	9 March 1905	
	Otto Joachim Moltke Kofoed-Hansen (1854–1918)	1 October 1911	
	Anton Ferdinand Mazanti Evers (1857–1951)	27 April 1918	
	Georg Hugh Robert Zachariae (1850–1937)	5 October 1918 (À la suite)	
	Henri Konow (1862–1939)	1 April 1923	
	Georg Carl Amdrup (1866–1947)	7 February 1927	
	Henri L. E. Wenck (1872–1933)	1 December 1931	
	Hjalmar Rechnitzer (1872–1953)	1 April 1932	
	A. H. Vedel (1894–1981)	1 August 1941	
	Hans Alfred Nyholm (1898–1964)	1 June 1958	
	Svend Erik Pontoppidan (1900–1987)	1 June 1961	
	Sven Støckel Thostrup (1915–2006)	1 December 1965	

== See also ==
- Admiral (Denmark)
- List of Danish full admirals
