= Qvistgaard =

Qvistgaard is a Danish surname. Notable people with the surname include:

- Berthe Qvistgaard (1910–1999), Danish stage and film actress
- Erhard J.C. Qvistgaard (1898–1980), Danish admiral
- Iver Qvistgaard (1767–1829), Danish mayor and landowner

== See also ==
- Quistgaard, same family, variant spelling

== Sources ==
- Fabritius, Albert. "Qvistgaard". In: Engelstoft, Povl & Svend Dahl (eds). Encyclopedic entry in Dansk Biografisk Leksikon. 2nd ed. Copenhagen: Schultz, 1932–44.
- Cedergreen Bech, Svend (red). Dansk biografisk leksikon. 3rd ed. Copenhagen: Schultz, 1979–84. Vol 11. Encyclopedic entry: "Qvistgaard (Quistgaard)".
- Qvistgaard, Erhard. Stamtavle over Slægten Qvistgaard fra Veirum, med Biografier og Billeder. 1st ed, 1893. 2nd ed, 1923.
- Qvistgaardske Slægtsforening, Den. Stamtavle over slægten Qvistgaard fra Veirum, med biografier og billeder. Full genealogy with biographies. 1974.
