= Sølvgade 20–22 =

Historic building in Copenhagen, Denmark

Sølvgade 20
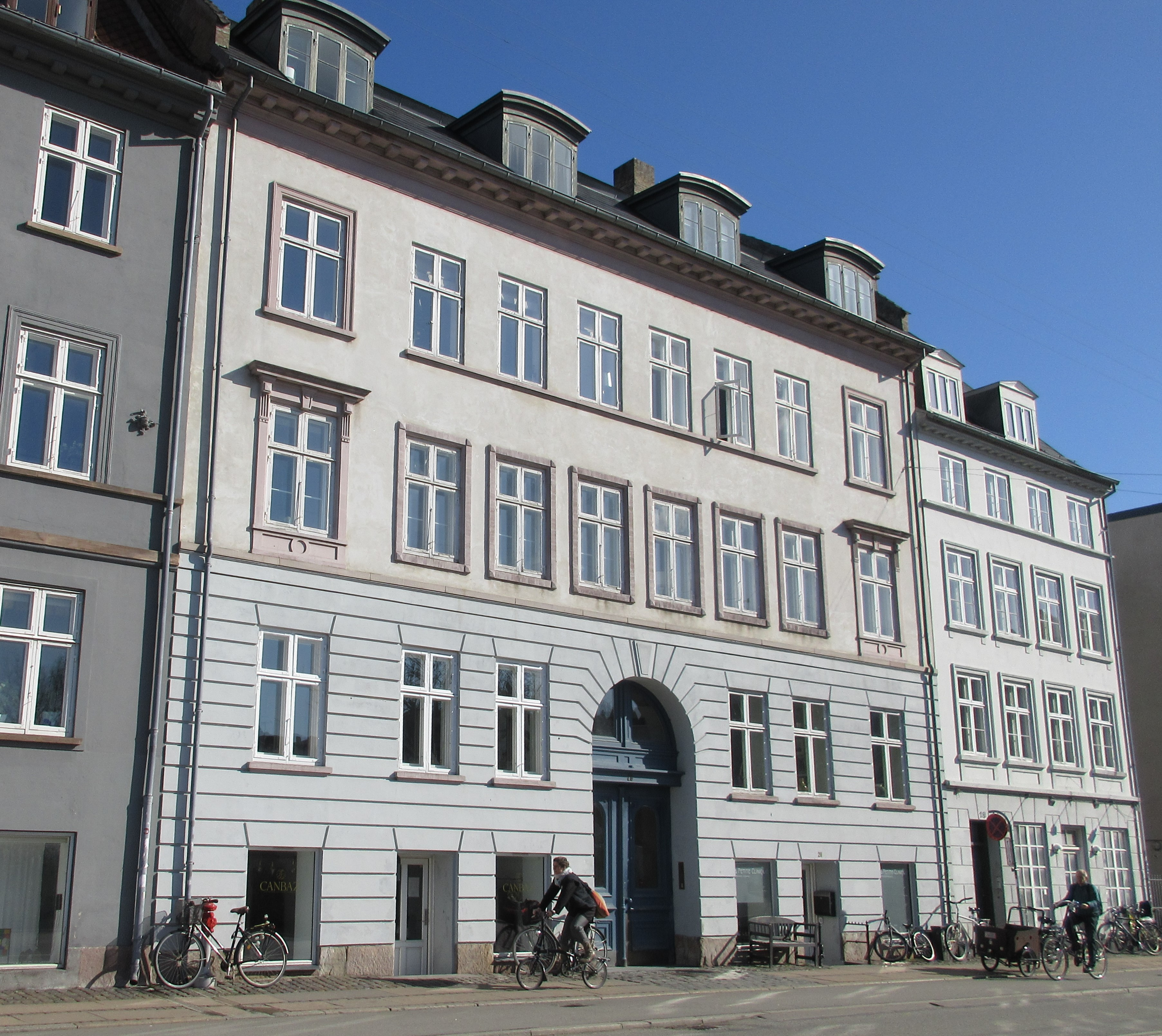
- Sølvgade 20 in 2017
- Interactive map of the Sølvgade 20 area

General information
- Architectural style: Neoclassical
- Location: Copenhagen, Denmark
- Coordinates: 55°41′11″N 12°34′58″E
- Completed: 1827 (Sølvgade 20). 1831 (Sølvgade 22)

Sølvgade 20–22 are two Neoclassical apartment buildings situated opposite Rosenborg Castle Garden in central Copenhagen, Denmark, constructed by master builder Thomas Blom between 1826 and 1831. They were individually listed in the Danish registry of protected buildings and places in 1977. Notable former residents of Sølvgade 20 include the military officer J.H. Mansa (1797-1885), politician Niels Møller Spandet, naval officer Carl van Dockum, army officer Olaf Rye, archaeologist Jens Jacob Asmussen Worsaae, journalist Gustav Esmann, historian and politician Niels Neergaard and actress Karen Lykkehus. Notable former residents of Sølcgade 22 include the military officer Carl Julius Flensborg.

== History ==
=== 17th century ===
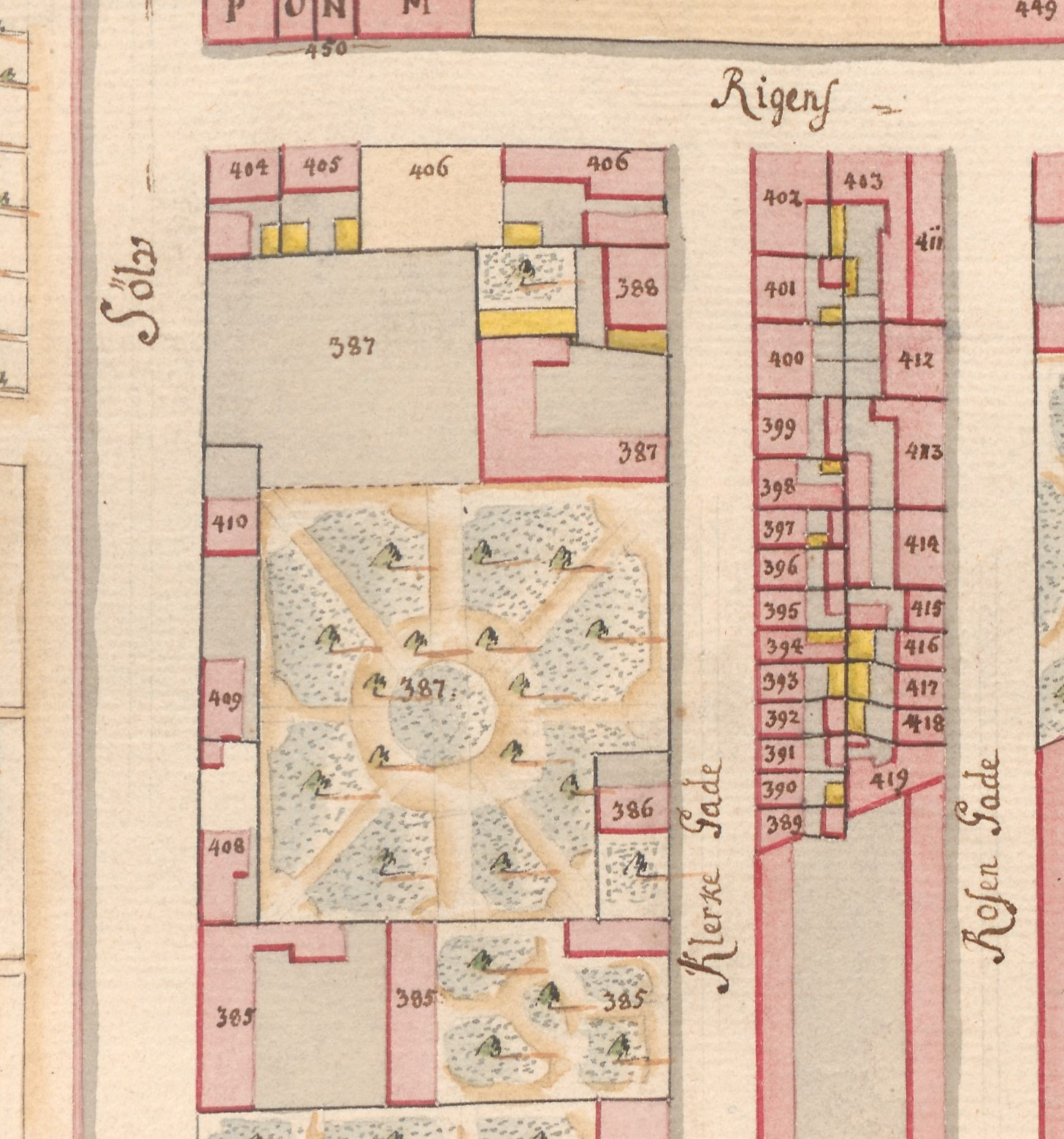
No. 398 seen on a detail from Christian Gedde's map of St. Ann's West Quarter, 1757.

A much larger property on the site was owned by dyer Gerhardt Andreas Gøbel from 1741. The property continued all the way to Klerkegade on the other side of the block, comprising what is now Klergegade 25–29. His property was listed in the new cadastre of 1756 as No. 387 in St. Ann's West Quarter. Gøbel was married to Sophie Hedevig Gøbel. She was after his death in the 1750s second time married to dyer Jean Louis Nourell. The property featured a large garden complex. An adjacent area was for a while let out to the Royal Copenhagen Shooting Society for use as a shooting range. In the 1780s, it relocated to a site outside the city's Western City Gate, The former shooting range was subsequently for a while used by haulier eter Petersen Carstensen. In 1800, Carstensen moved away after purchasing a house in nearby Rigensgade (now Rigensgade 28, demolished).

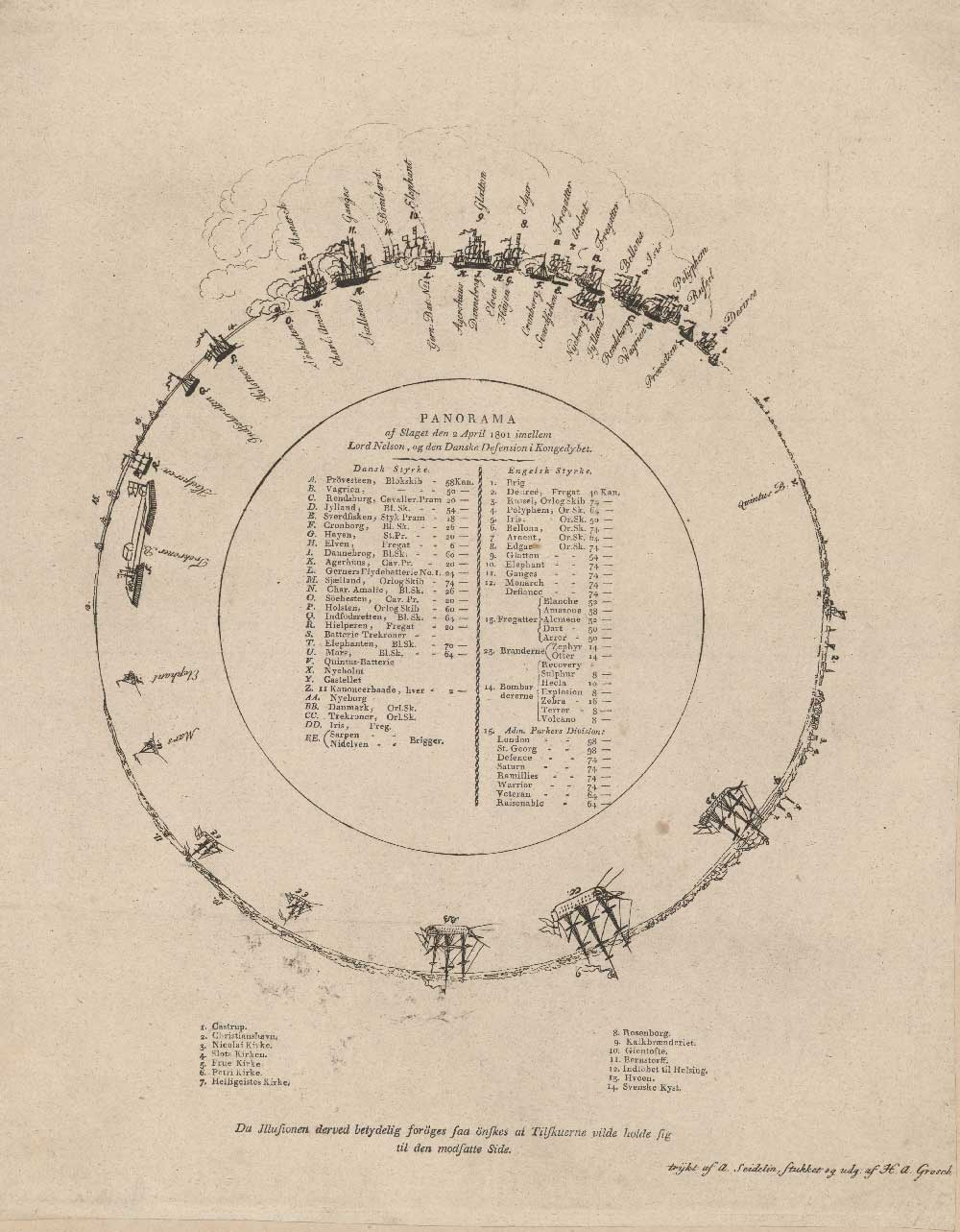
Heinrich Grosch's panoramic painting of the 1801 Battle of Copenhagen.

In 1783, No. 387 was sold to barkeeper Christen Schaarup. In 1788, it came into the possession of Københavns Overformynderi and was the same day ceded to controller at the Danish West India Company Peter Schmidt. In 1791, it was acquired by master tailor Jens Schønberg. The property was after his death passed to his widow Helene Chatrine Nørsing (1756-1842). She was second time married to the priest Andreas Tamdrup Rachlou, owner of Nygård at Snoldelev.

=== 1799–1724 ===
In 1800, Andreas Kirkerup purchased the property. A rotunda for exhibition of panoramic paintings was subsequently constructed on the site of the former shooting range, probably in timber to Kirkerup's own design. It was only used for the exhibition of a single panoramic painting. It was created by printmaker and stage painter Heinrich August Grosch (1763-1843) with public funding and depicted the 1801 naval battle of Copenhagen. The exhibition opened in 1802 but was already closed the following year.

Kirkerup owned the property until his death in 1810. It was listed in the new cadastre of 1806 as No. 416. In 1814, part of the property was sold at auction to the merchants Moses Martin Meyer and Ludvig Fürst. In 1816, it was acquired by textile manufacturer Christorph Prøsilius (1743-1823).

=== Thomas Blom and the new building ===
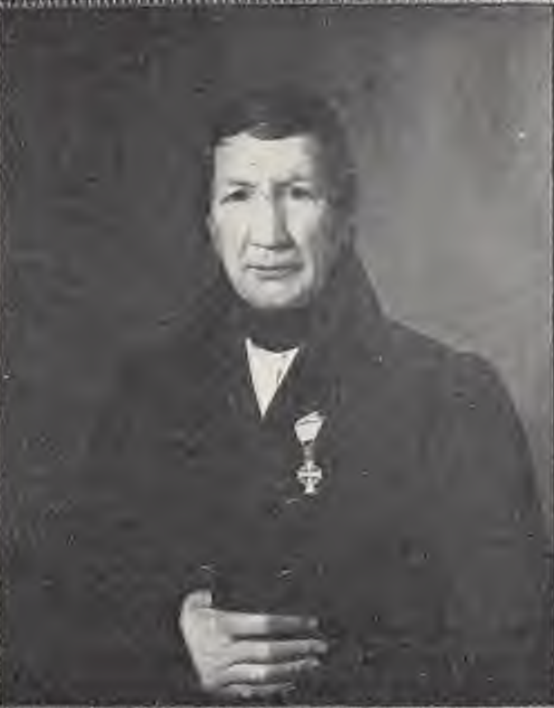
Thomas Blom

In 1824, Prøsilius' property was sold to the master mason Thomas Blom. He was familiar with the area since he had already built up the two corners of nearby Kronprinsessegade and Dronningens Tværgade with residential buildings in the 1800s and 1810s. In the meantime, he had worked on the reconstruction of Christiansborg Palace and Church of Our Ladym both of them to designs by Christian Frederik Hansen, following their fires in 1794 and 1807. In 1826, he sold part of his new property and divided the remaining land into two properties. He embarked on the construction of Sølvgade 20 (then No. 416 C) immediately thereafter and the building was completed the following year. The property contained two five-room apartments on each floor as well as two retail spaces in the basement. In 1830–31, he proceeded with the construction of the property at Sølvgade 22 (then No. 416 D). Blom did not sell Sølvgade 20 until 1847. Sølvgade 22 was not sold until 1849.

=== Sølvgade 20, 1827–present ===
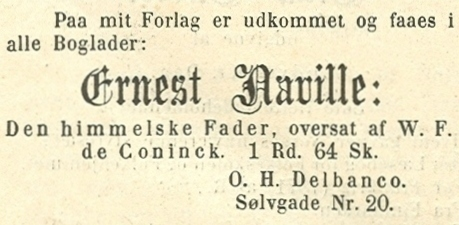
Advert for O.H. Delbanco's publishing business published in Illustreret Tidende on No. 68, 1 December 1872.

J.H. Mansa (1797-1885), a military officer and carteographer, resided in one of the apartments from 1828 to 1831. Niels Møller Spandet, a politician and former judge, resided in another apartment from 1830 until his death 28 years later. Carl van Dockum, a naval officer, resided in the building before moving to the Danish West Indies in 1839. Olaf Rye, an army officer, then with rank of lieutenant-colonel, was a resident of the building in 1843–44, just five years before he was killed in the Battle of Fredericia. Jens Jacob Asmussen Worsaae, an archaeologist and the second director of the National Museum of Denmark, resided in the building in 1858–1859. Otto Herman Delbanco, a bookseller, publisher and editor, resided in the building in the early 1870s and also ran his publishing business from the premises. Gustav Esmann, a journalist, author and screenwriter, resided in the building from 1892 to 1899. Niels Neergaard, a historian and politician, resided in the building in around 1891. The actress Karen Lykkehus (1904-1992) resided in the building from 1911 to 1928. The central courtyard was closed by the construction of a new gumnastics building for Sølvgade School in 1883.

=== Sølvgade 20, 1831–present ===
Carl Julius Flensborg, military officer, was among the residents of Sølvgade 22 from 1844 to 1848.

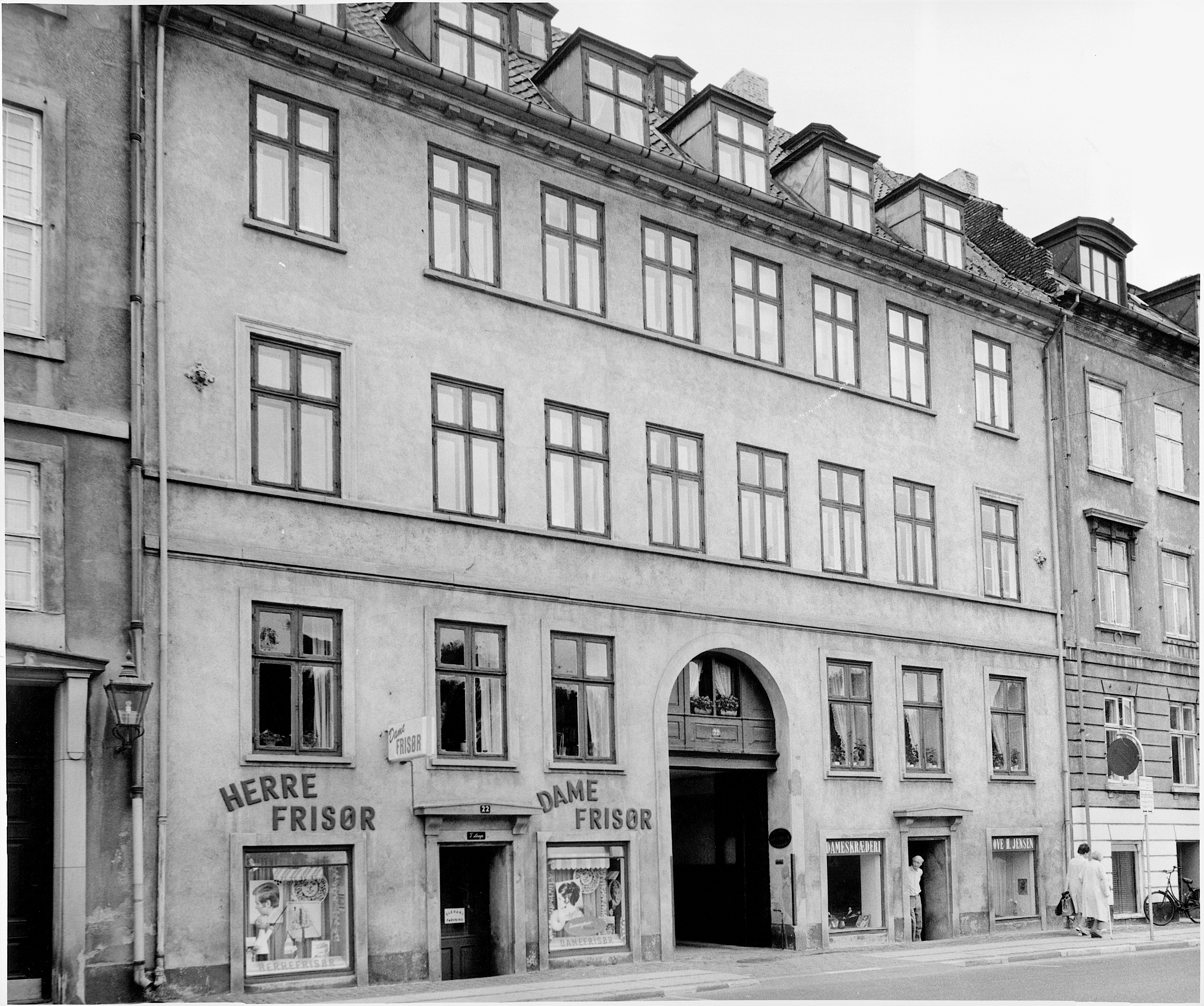
Sølvgade 22 in 1970.

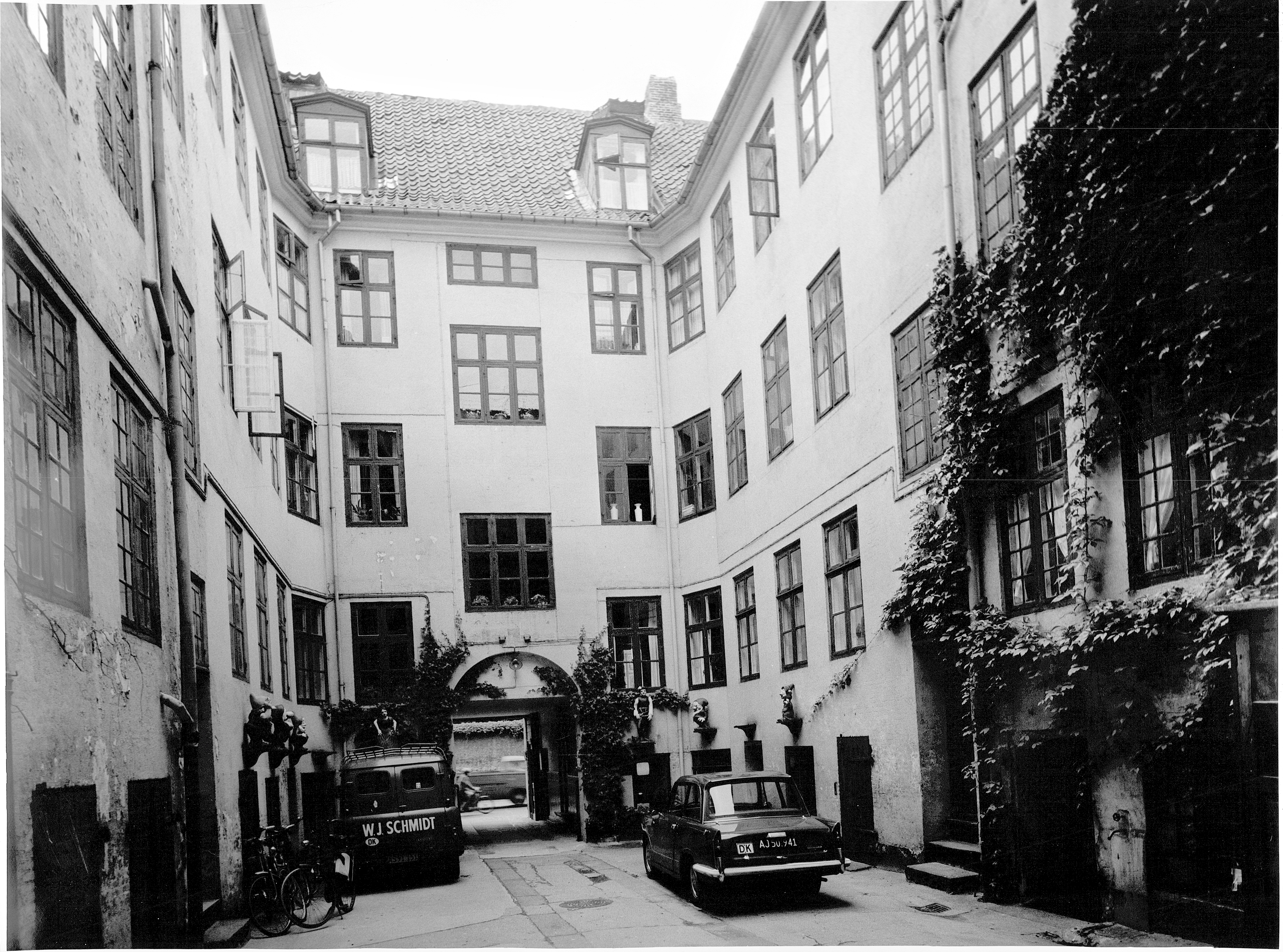
The front wing viewed from the yard, 1970.

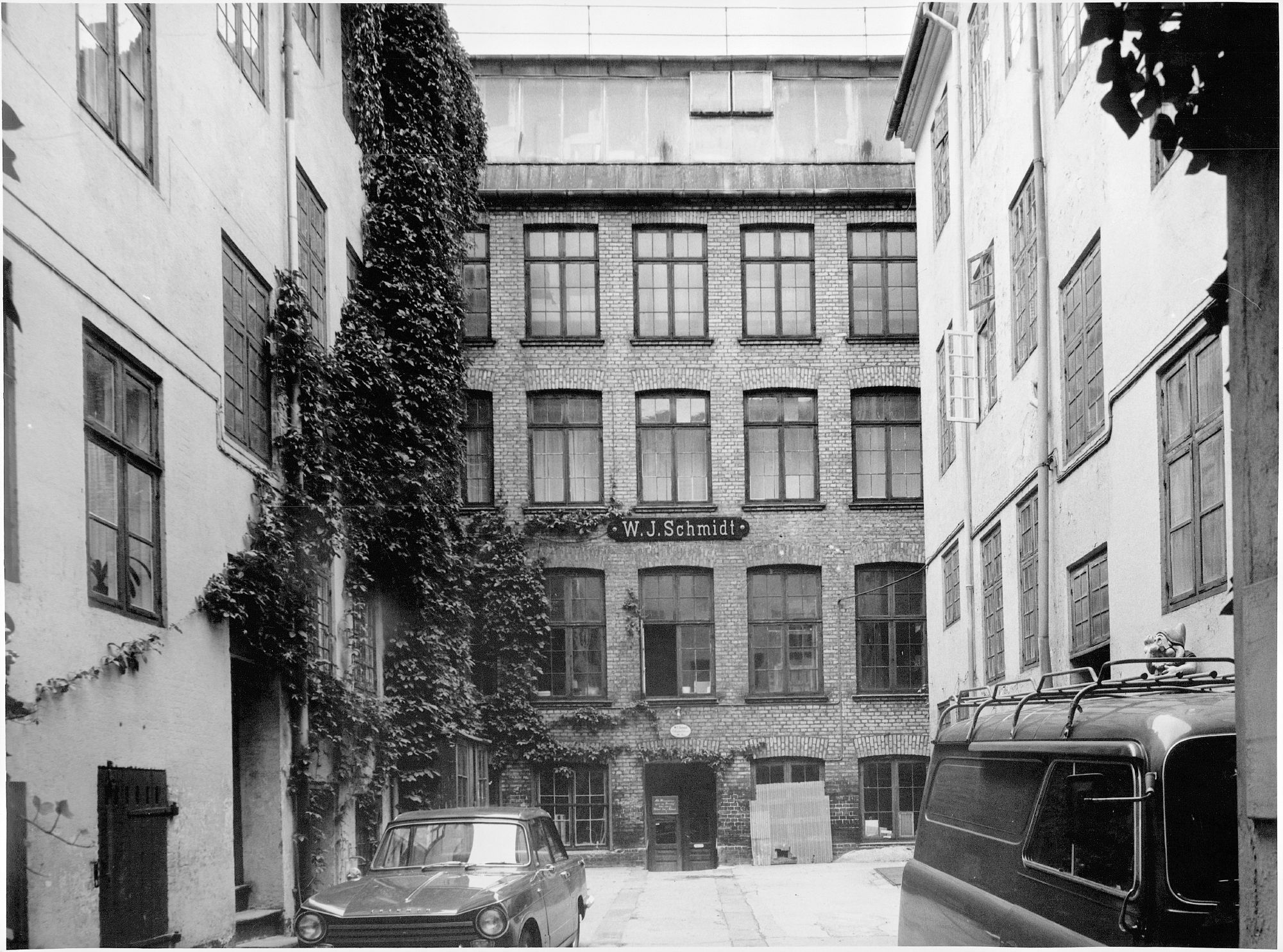
The rear wing of Sølvgade 22, 1970.

== Architecture ==
=== Sølvgade 20 ===
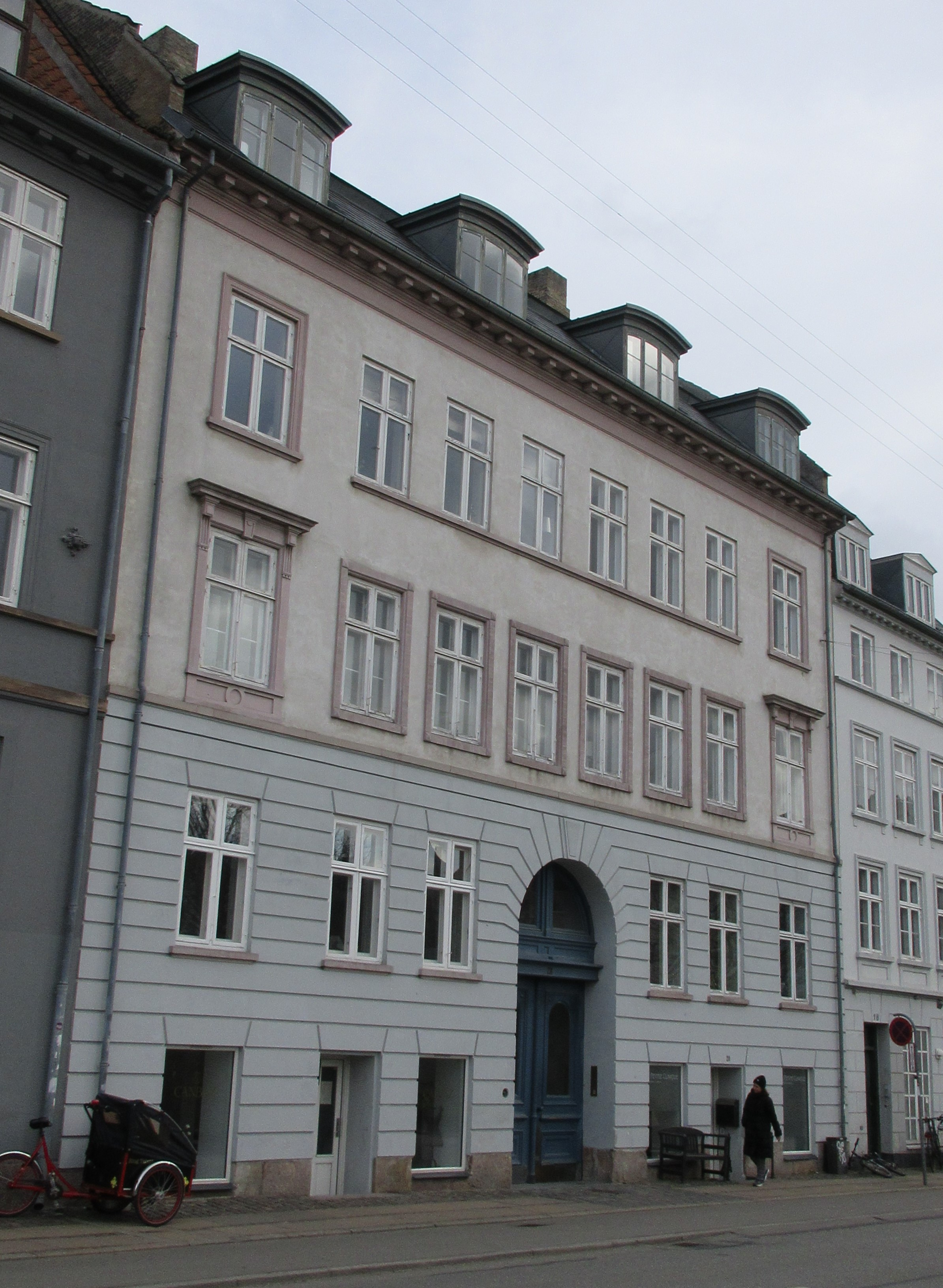
Sølvgade 20.

Sølvgade 20 is constructed in brick on a low sandstone plinth with three storeys over a walk-out basement. The eight-bays-long plastered facade is finished with shadow joints on the ground floor and the exposed part of the basement. The smooth upper part of the facade is finished with a modillion cornice. The first-floor windows are accented with robust framing and the two outer ones also with hood moulds supported by fluted corbels. The six central windows of the second floor are visually brought together by a sill course. An arched gateway in the two central bays provides access to the central courtyard as well as to the main staircase via a door in one side of the gateway. The gate is flanked by two basement entrances in the second and seventh bay. Two seven-bays-long side wings extend from the rear side of the front wing along each their side of the central courtyard. They are integrated with the front wing by two outwardly curved corner bays. They both feature a gabled wall dormer with the remains of a pulley in the sixth bay. The pitched roof is clad with black slate towards the street and red tile towards the courtyard.

=== Sølvgade 22 ===
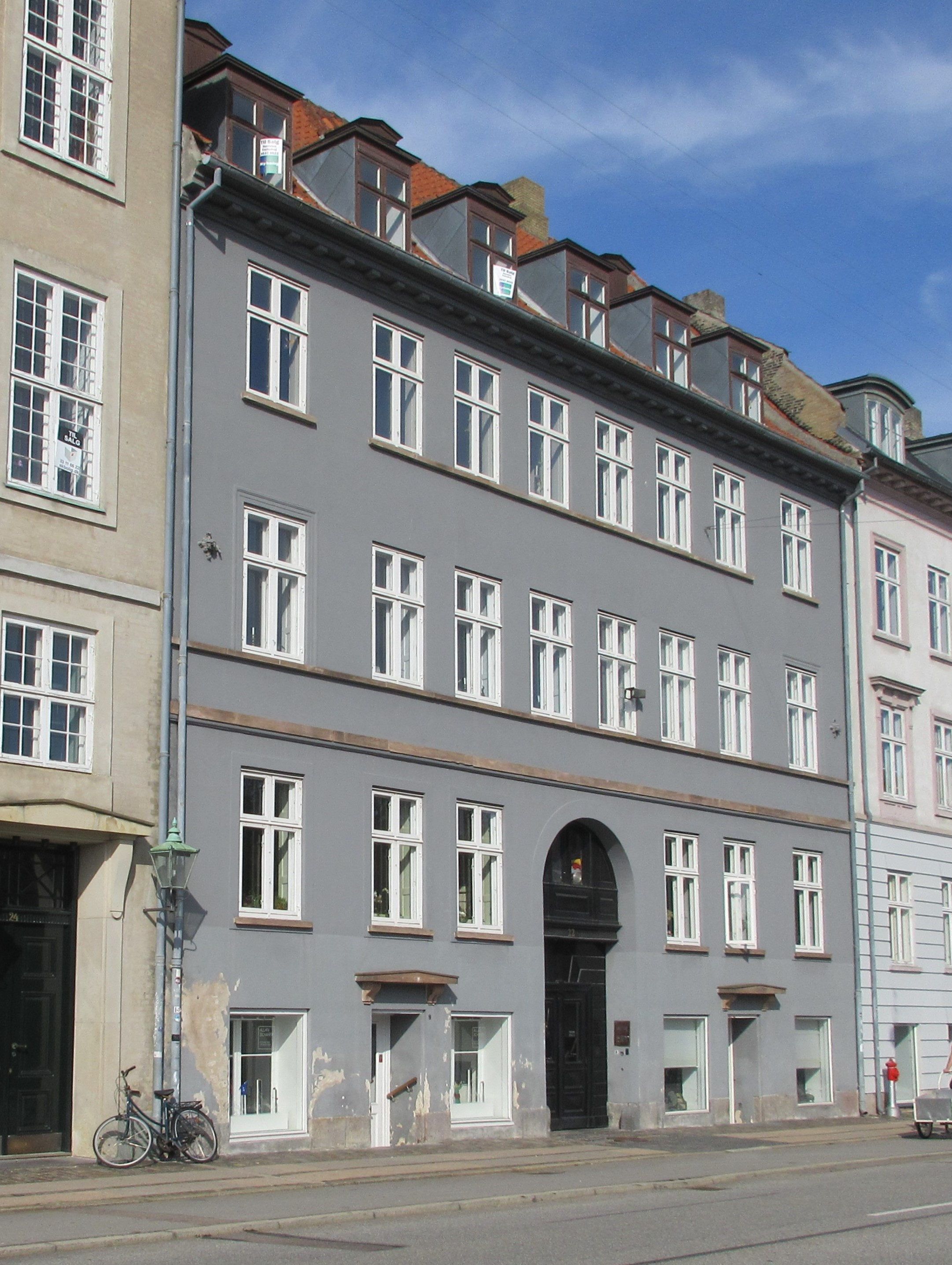
Sølvgade 22.

Sølvgade 22 was originally built to a largely similar design to that of Sølcgade 20 but appears today with a quite different facade. It has no shadow joints on the ground floor and exposed part of the basement and the details around the first-floor windows are also lacking. The facade is instead finished with a narrow belt course above the ground floor, a sill course in the full length of the building on the first floor and below the six central windows on the second floor as well as a modillioned cornice. The two basement entrances are topped by hood moulds. The modillioned cornice and the details around the outer first floor windows are on the other hand lacking. The courtyard of No. to is on its rear closed by a wall.

== Today ==
Sølvgade 22 is today owned by E/F Sølvgade 22. It contains two condominiums on each of the upper floors and two shops in the basement.

== See also ==
- Søtorvet
