= Ranks and insignia of the Royal Danish Navy =

The Royal Danish Navy ranks follows the NATO system of ranks and insignia, as does the rest of the Danish Defence. Outside this ranking system there are physicians (who may wear the same insignia in the Army/Air Force but with a slight variation in the Navy), nurses and veterinarians, while priests and judicial personnel wear completely different insignia and are without rank.

== Current ranks ==
Besides the NATO-system, the Danish defence utilizes its own system, which for the navy is as follows:

- Military personnel, level 400 (M400, chef-gruppen) Executive level: OF-4 through OF-9
- Military personnel, level 300 (M300, officers-gruppen) Operational level: OF-1 through OF-3
- Military personnel, level 200 (M200, sergent-gruppen) NCO level: OR-5 through OR-9
- Military personnel, level 100 (M100, konstabel-gruppen) Seamen level: OR-1 through OR-4

=== Officers ===
The highest officer's rank is OF-9 (Admiral) which is reserved for the Chief of Defence (only when this seat is occupied by a naval officer) and the King of Denmark. The Prince Consort of Denmark held the rank of Admiral (à la suite). Similarly, OF-8 (Vice-admiral) is reserved for the Vice Chief of Defence). OF-7 (Kontreadmiral) is used by the Chief of the Royal Danish Navy and OF-6 (Flotilleadmiral) by the chief of Danish Task Group as well as keepers of high-office positions. OF-4 and OF-5 are mainly chiefs of squadrons, schools and larger vessels. OF-1 through OF-3 are used in a variety of positions.

NATO code	OF-10	OF-9	OF-8	OF-7	OF-6	OF-5	OF-4	OF-3	OF-2	OF-1
Royal Danish Navy
Royal Danish Navy		Admiral	Viceadmiral	Kontreadmiral	Flotilleadmiral	Kommandør	Kommandørkaptajn	Orlogskaptajn	Kaptajnløjtnant	Premierløjtnant	Løjtnant
Medical
Medical					Generallæge	Stabslæge I Stabstandlæge I Stabsdyrlæge I	Stabslæge II; Stabstandlæge II; Stabsdyrlæge II	Overlæge; Overtandlæge; Overdyrlæge; Afdelingslæge; Afdelingstandlæge; Afdelingsdyrlæge	Reservelæge I Reservetandlæge I Reservedyrlæge I	Reservelæge II; Reservetandlæge II; Reservedyrlæge II		Reservelæge III; Reservetandlæge III; Reservedyrlæge III
Danish Pay Grade		M406	M405	M404	M403	M402	M401	M332 M331 M322	M321	M312		M311

==== Rank flags ====
Rank	Admiral	Viceadmiral	Kontreadmiral	Flotilleadmiral	Eskadrechef
1625–	on main-mast	on fore-mast			
1858–1882				—	
1882–c. 1900				—	
c. 1900–1979				—	
1979–present					

=== Enlisted ===
The Danish OR's also follow the NATO system, though there are no OR-6's. OR-4 (Korporal) is the highest of the M100-level ranks is and not considered a NCO-rank.

NATO code	OR-9	OR-8	OR-7	OR-6	OR-5		OR-4	OR-3	OR-2	OR-1
Slip-on insignia
Royal Danish Navy
Royal Danish Navy	Chefsergent	Seniorsergent	Oversergent		Sergent	Sergent SØ	Korporal	Marinespecialist	Marineoverkonstabel	Marinekonstabel
Danish Pay Grade	M232	M231	M221		M212	M211	M113	M112

==== Branch of service ====
The branch of service emblems are worn by all NCOs and enlisted, except for Chefsergent who wears a crown.

Våben, artilleri	Våben, torpedo	Militærpoliti	Våben, mine
Kampinformation	Elektronik	DATA (Informatik)	Automatik
Kommunikation	Maskin	Administration (Intendantur)	Sanitet
Proviant/forplejning	Tamburkorps	Chefsergent	Sergentelev

=== Additional ranks ===
NATO Code	OR-9		OR-8	OR-1
Rank
Danish	Søværnschefsergent	Myndighedschefsergent	Myndighedsseniorsergent	Stampersonel SØ	Værnepligtig SØ
English	Master chief petty officer of the Navy	Command master chief petty officer	Command senior chief petty officer	Junior rating/Trainee	Conscript

=== Mechanics ===
Rank group	Mechanics
Shoulder insignia
Sleeve insignia
	Seniormekaniker	Overmekaniker af 1. grad	Overmekaniker af 2. grad	Mekaniker

=== Clerical personnel ===
Rank group	Clerical personnel
Shoulder insignia
Sleeve insignia
	Orlogsprovst	Orlogspræst

== Types of rank insignia ==
Rank (example)	Shoulder	Sleeve	INTOPS	Epaulette
Chefsergent				None
Orlogskaptajn				

== Historical ranks ==
The sleeve insignia was first introduced in the Royal Navy in 1871 and was based around the British Royal Navy. In order to become more standard, the admiral ranks were changed in 1951.

=== Timeline of changes ===
==== Modern ranks 1858-present ====
Rank group	General / flag officers					Senior officers			Junior officers
1801–1812
1801–1812		Admiral	Vice-admiral	Contre-admiral		Commandeur	Commandeur-capitain	Capitain	Capitain-lieutenant	Premier-lieutenant		Second-lieutenant
1812–1822
1812–1822		Admiral	Vice-admiral	Contre-admiral		Commandeur	Commandeur-capitain	Capitain	Capitain-lieutenant	Premier-lieutenant		Second-lieutenant
1841–1856
1841–1856		Admiral	Viceadmiral	Kontreadmiral		Kommandør	Kommandørkaptajn	Kaptajn	Kaptajnløjtnant	Premierløjtnant		Sekondløjtnant
1858–1868
1858–1868		Admiral	Viceadmiral	Kontreadmiral				Orlogskaptajn	Kaptajnløjtnant	Løjtnant
1868–1871
1868–1871		Admiral				Kommandør			Kaptajn	Premierløjtnant		Sekondløjtnant
1871–1880
1871–1880		Admiral				Kommandør			Kaptajn	Premierløjtnant		Sekondløjtnant
1909–1922
1909–1922		Admiral	Viceadmiral	Kontreadmiral		Kommandør			Kaptajn	Premierløjtnant	Løjtnant	Sekondløjtnant
1922–1937
1922–1937		Admiral	Viceadmiral	Kontreadmiral		Kommandør	Kommandørkaptajn	Orlogskaptajn	Kaptajnløjtnant	Søløjtnant af 1. grad		Søløjtnant af 2. grad
1937–1951
1937–1951		Admiral	Viceadmiral	Kontreadmiral		Kommandør	Kommandørkaptajn	Orlogskaptajn	Kaptajnløjtnant	Søløjtnant af 1. grad		Søløjtnant af 2. grad
1951–1970
1951–1970		Admiral	Viceadmiral	Kontreadmiral		Kommandør	Kommandørkaptajn	Orlogskaptajn	Kaptajnløjtnant	Søløjtnant af 1. grad	Løjtnant	Søløjtnant af 2. grad
1970–1983
1970–1983		Admiral	Viceadmiral	Kontreadmiral		Kommandør	Kommandørkaptajn	Orlogskaptajn	Kaptajnløjtnant	Premierløjtnant	Løjtnant	Sekondløjtnant
1983–2000
1983–2000		Admiral	Viceadmiral	Kontreadmiral	Flotilleadmiral	Kommandør	Kommandørkaptajn	Orlogskaptajn	Kaptajnløjtnant	Premierløjtnant	Løjtnant	Sekondløjtnant
2000–2011
2000–2011		Admiral	Viceadmiral	Kontreadmiral	Flotilleadmiral	Kommandør	Kommandørkaptajn	Orlogskaptajn	Kaptajnløjtnant	Premierløjtnant	Løjtnant
2011–present
2011–present		Admiral	Viceadmiral	Kontreadmiral	Flotilleadmiral	Kommandør	Kommandørkaptajn	Orlogskaptajn	Kaptajnløjtnant	Premierløjtnant	Løjtnant
NATO code	OF-10	OF-9	OF-8	OF-7	OF-6	OF-5	OF-4	OF-3	OF-2	OF-1

=== Other ranks ===
Rank group	NCOs						Enlisted
1923–1951
1923–1951	Overbaadsmand	Baadsmand	Underbaadsmand	Matrosoverkonstabel		Overmatros		Matroskonstabel 1. klasse	Matroskonstabel 2. klasse	Matroskonstabel 3. klasse
1959–1962
1959–1962			Oversergent	Sergent		Korporal		Sergentelev		Math	Mathelev
1962–1965
1962–1965	Seniorsergent af 1. grad	Seniorsergent af 2. grad	Oversergent	Sergent		Korporal			Overkonstabel	Konstable	Konstabelelev
1965–1982
1965–1982	Seniorsergent af 1. grad	Seniorsergent af 2. grad	Oversergent	Sergent	Sergent (conscript)	Korporal	Korporal (conscript)	Overkonstabel af 1. grad	Overkonstabel af 2. grad	Konstable	Konstabelelev
1982–2008
1982–2008	Chefsergent	Seniorsergent	Oversergent	Sergent	Sergent (conscript)	Korporal		Marinespecialist	Marineoverkonstabel	Marinekonstable	Marinekonstabelelev
2008–present
2008–present	Chefsergent	Seniorsergent	Oversergent	Sergent	Sergent SØ		Korporal	Marinespecialist	Marineoverkonstabel	Marinekonstable	Marinekonstabelelev
NATO code	OR-9	OR-8	OR-7	OR-5		OR-4		OR-3	OR-2	OR-1

==== Warrant officers ====
Rank group	Branch officers/Special duty officers
1951–1963
1951–1963	Orlogskaptajn af specialgruppen	Kaptajnløjtnant af specialgruppen	Søløjtnant af 1. grad af specialgruppen	Overfenrik	Fenrik
1963–1970
1963–1970	Orlogskaptajn af specialgruppen	Kaptajnløjtnant af specialgruppen	Søløjtnant af 1. grad af specialgruppen	Overfenrik	Fenrik
