= Chief of the Royal Danish Navy =

Chief of the Naval Command
- Chef for Søværnskommandoen (Danish)
- Coat of Arms

- Rank flag for Rear admirals

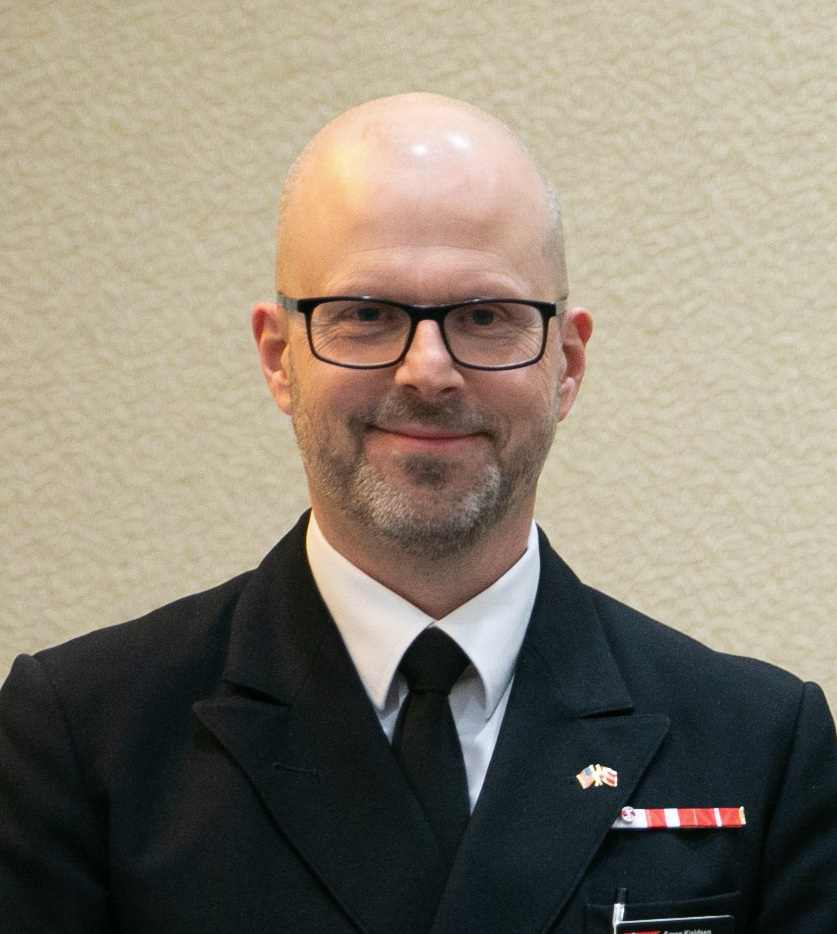
- Incumbent; Counter admiral Søren Kjeldsen since 1 December 2024
- Royal Danish Navy
- Member of: Defence Command
- Reports to: Chief of Defence
- Term length: No fixed length
- Formation: 2 April 1852
- First holder: Christian Christopher Zahrtmann

The Chief of the Royal Danish Navy is the professional head of the Royal Danish Navy.

== History ==
Originally the commander of the navy was the King, with daily control given to the Admiralty and Commissioners College. The Admiralty existed from 1660 until the end of absolute monarchy in 1848. In 1852, the position of Navy Inspector (Danish: Flådeinspektør) is established as the commander of the navy. Following the Naval Law of 1909, the position was renamed the General Inspector for the Navy (Danish: Generalinspektør for søværnet). After the Naval Law of 1932, the vice admiral would become Chief of the Naval Command (Danish: Chef for Søværnskommandoen) and director of the Ministry of the Navy. In 1960, the position was renamed to Chief of the Navy (Danish: Chef for Søværnet). Following major reductions in the 1980s, the name was again changed, this time to Inspector of the Navy (Danish: Inspektøren for Søværnet). In 1990, the Marine staff and the position of Inspector of the Navy were abolished, resulting in all areas of responsibility being transferred to the Admiral Danish Fleet. Following the Danish Defence Agreement 2013–17, the Admiral Danish Fleet was disbanded and reorganised into the Naval Staff. On 1 January 2019, as part of the Danish Defence Agreement 2018–23, the name was changed to Chief of the Naval Command (Danish: Chef for Søværnskommandoen).

== List of chiefs ==
=== Navy Inspector ===
No.	Portrait	Name (Birth–Death)	Term of office			Ref.
No.	Portrait	Name (Birth–Death)	Took office	Left office	Time in office	Ref.
1	Christian Christopher Zahrtmann [da]	Vice admiral Christian Christopher Zahrtmann (1793–1853)	2 April 1852	1 April 1853	364 days	
2	Conrad Emil Mourier	Vice admiral Conrad Emil Mourier (1795–1865)	1 April 1853	28 February 1860	6 years, 333 days	
3	Johan Anton Meyer	Vice admiral Johan Anton Meyer (1799–1875)	28 February 1860	28 December 1862	2 years, 303 days	
4	Carl Edvard van Dockum	Vice admiral Carl Edvard van Dockum (1804–1893)	28 December 1862	17 September 1866	3 years, 263 days	
5	Steen Andersen Bille	Vice admiral Steen Andersen Bille (1797–1883)	24 September 1866	27 January 1868	1 year, 125 days	
(4)	Carl Edvard van Dockum	Vice admiral Carl Edvard van Dockum (1804–1893)	27 January 1868	27 March 1869	1 year, 59 days	
6	Jørgen Peter Frederik Wulff	Vice admiral Jørgen Peter Frederik Wulff (1808–1881)	27 March 1869	19 June 1873	4 years, 84 days	
7	Frederik Laurentius Fiedler Sommer	Vice admiral Frederik Laurentius Fiedler Sommer (1813–1878)	19 June 1873	20 July 1878 †	5 years, 31 days	
–	August Christian Schultz	Vice admiral August Christian Schultz (1813–1908); Acting	20 July 1878	24 July 1878	4 days	
8	Gerhard Frederik Wilhelm Wrisberg	Vice admiral Gerhard Frederik Wilhelm Wrisberg (1816–1896)	24 July 1878	20 February 1886	7 years, 211 days	
9	Julius Meldal [da]	Vice admiral Julius Meldal (1827–1901)	21 February 1886	19 July 1897	11 years, 148 days	
10	Hans Henrik Koch	Vice admiral Hans Henrik Koch (1836–1903)	19 July 1897	2 January 1899	1 year, 167 days	
11	Fritz Peter Adolph Uldall	Vice admiral Fritz Peter Adolph Uldall (1835–1911)	2 January 1899	9 March 1905	6 years, 66 days	
12	Carl Frederik Wandel	Vice admiral Carl Frederik Wandel (1843–1930)	9 March 1905	5 March 1909	3 years, 361 days	

=== General Inspector for the Navy ===
No.	Portrait	Name (Birth–Death)	Term of office			Ref.
No.	Portrait	Name (Birth–Death)	Took office	Left office	Time in office	Ref.
1	Carl Frederik Wandel	Vice admiral Carl Frederik Wandel (1843–1930)	5 March 1909	1 August 1911	2 years, 180 days	
2	Otto Joachim Moltke Kofoed-Hansen	Vice admiral Otto Joachim Moltke Kofoed-Hansen (1854–1918)	1 August 1911	11 April 1918 †	6 years, 222 days	
3	Anton Ferdinand Mazanti Evers	Vice admiral Anton Ferdinand Mazanti Evers (1857–1951)	27 April 1918	31 March 1923	4 years, 338 days	
4	Henri Konow	Vice admiral Henri Konow (1862–1939)	1 April 1923	7 February 1927	3 years, 313 days	
5	Georg Carl Amdrup	Vice admiral Georg Carl Amdrup (1866–1947)	7 February 1927	30 November 1931	4 years, 296 days	
6	Henri L. E. Wenck	Vice admiral Henri L. E. Wenck (1872–1933)	1 December 1931	31 March 1932	121 days	

=== Chiefs of the Naval Command ===
No.	Portrait	Name (Birth–Death)	Term of office			Ref.
No.	Portrait	Name (Birth–Death)	Took office	Left office	Time in office	Ref.
1	Hjalmar Rechnitzer	Vice admiral Hjalmar Rechnitzer (1872–1953)	1 April 1932	10 May 1940	8 years, 39 days	
–	Emmanuel Briand de Crèvecoeur	Counter admiral Emmanuel Briand de Crèvecoeur (1882–1968); Acting	10 May 1940	25 July 1941	1 year, 76 days	
–	A. H. Vedel	Counter admiral A. H. Vedel (1894–1981); Acting	25 July 1941	31 July 1941	6 days	
2	A. H. Vedel	Vice admiral A. H. Vedel (1894–1981)	1 August 1941	29 August 1943	2 years, 28 days	
Vacant; No chief following Operation Safari
(2)	A. H. Vedel	Vice admiral A. H. Vedel (1894–1981)	5 May 1945	31 May 1958	13 years, 26 days	

=== Chiefs of the Navy ===
No.	Portrait	Name (Birth–Death)	Term of office			Ref.
No.	Portrait	Name (Birth–Death)	Took office	Left office	Time in office	Ref.
1	Hans Alfred Nyholm	Vice admiral Hans Alfred Nyholm (1898–1964)	1 June 1958	31 May 1961	2 years, 364 days	
2	Svend Erik Pontoppidan	Vice admiral Svend Erik Pontoppidan (1900–1987)	1 June 1961	30 November 1965	4 years, 182 days	
3	Sven Støckel Thostrup	Vice admiral Sven Støckel Thostrup (1915–2006)	1 December 1965	31 January 1980	14 years, 62 days	
4	Niels Færgemann Lange	Counter admiral Niels Færgemann Lange (1919–2006)	1 February 1980	30 June 1982	2 years, 150 days	

=== Inspector of the Navy ===
No.	Portrait	Name (Birth–Death)	Term of office			Ref.
No.	Portrait	Name (Birth–Death)	Took office	Left office	Time in office	Ref.
1	Niels Færgemann Lange	Counter admiral Niels Færgemann Lange (1919–2006)	1 July 1982	1984	1–2 years	
2	Jørgen Philip Rasmussen	Counter admiral Jørgen Philip Rasmussen (1925–2017)	1984	1986	1–2 years	–
3	Mogens Michael Telling	Counter admiral Mogens Michael Telling (1927–2011)	1986	1989	2–3 years	
4	Johan Andersen Ruth	Counter admiral Johan Andersen Ruth (born 1930)	1989	31 December 1990	0–1 years	–

=== Chiefs of the Admiral Danish Fleet ===
No.	Portrait	Name (Birth–Death)	Term of office			Ref.
No.	Portrait	Name (Birth–Death)	Took office	Left office	Time in office	Ref.
1	Knud Erik Johan Borck	Counter admiral Knud Erik Johan Borck (1940–2011)	1 January 1991	30 April 1995	4 years, 119 days	
2	Kristen Husted Winther	Counter admiral Kristen Husted Winther (born 1946)	1 May 1995	30 June 2000	5 years, 60 days	
3	Tim Sloth Jørgensen	Counter admiral Tim Sloth Jørgensen (born 1951)	1 July 2000	31 July 2002	2 years, 30 days	
4	Kurt Birger Jensen	Counter admiral Kurt Birger Jensen (born 1949)	1 August 2002	31 July 2005	2 years, 364 days	
5	Nils Christian Wang [da]	Counter admiral Nils Christian Wang (born 1958)	1 August 2005	31 August 2010	5 years, 30 days	
6	Finn Hansen [da]	Counter admiral Finn Hansen (born 1957)	1 September 2010	1 April 2013	2 years, 212 days	
–	Jan Leisborch	Flotilla admiral Jan Leisborch (born 1954); Acting	1 April 2013	15 April 2013	14 days	
7	Frank Trojahn	Counter admiral Frank Trojahn (born 1963)	15 April 2013	30 September 2014	1 year, 168 days	

=== Chiefs of the Naval Staff ===
No.	Portrait	Name (Birth–Death)	Term of office			Ref.
No.	Portrait	Name (Birth–Death)	Took office	Left office	Time in office	Ref.
1	Frank Trojahn	Counter admiral Frank Trojahn (born 1963)	1 October 2014	31 March 2017	2 years, 242 days	
2	Torben Mikkelsen	Counter admiral Torben Mikkelsen (born 1963)	1 June 2017	31 December 2018	1 year, 213 days	

=== Chiefs of the Naval Command ===
No.	Portrait	Name (Birth–Death)	Term of office			Ref.
No.	Portrait	Name (Birth–Death)	Took office	Left office	Time in office	Ref.
1	Torben Mikkelsen	Counter admiral Torben Mikkelsen (born 1963)	1 January 2019	1 June 2022	3 years, 151 days	
–	Carsten Fjord-Larsen	Flotilla admiral Carsten Fjord-Larsen; Acting	1 June 2022	1 April 2023	304 days	
2		Counter admiral Henrik Ryberg (born 1963)	1 April 2023	1 December 2024	1 year, 244 days	
3		Counter admiral Søren Kjeldsen (born 1971)	1 December 2024	Incumbent	1 year, 280 days	

== See also ==
- Chief of Defence (Denmark)
- Chief of the Royal Danish Army
- Chief of the Royal Danish Air Force
