= Battle of Isefjord =

Naval battle during World War II

Coordinates: 55.914°N 11.816°E

- Part of Operation Safari
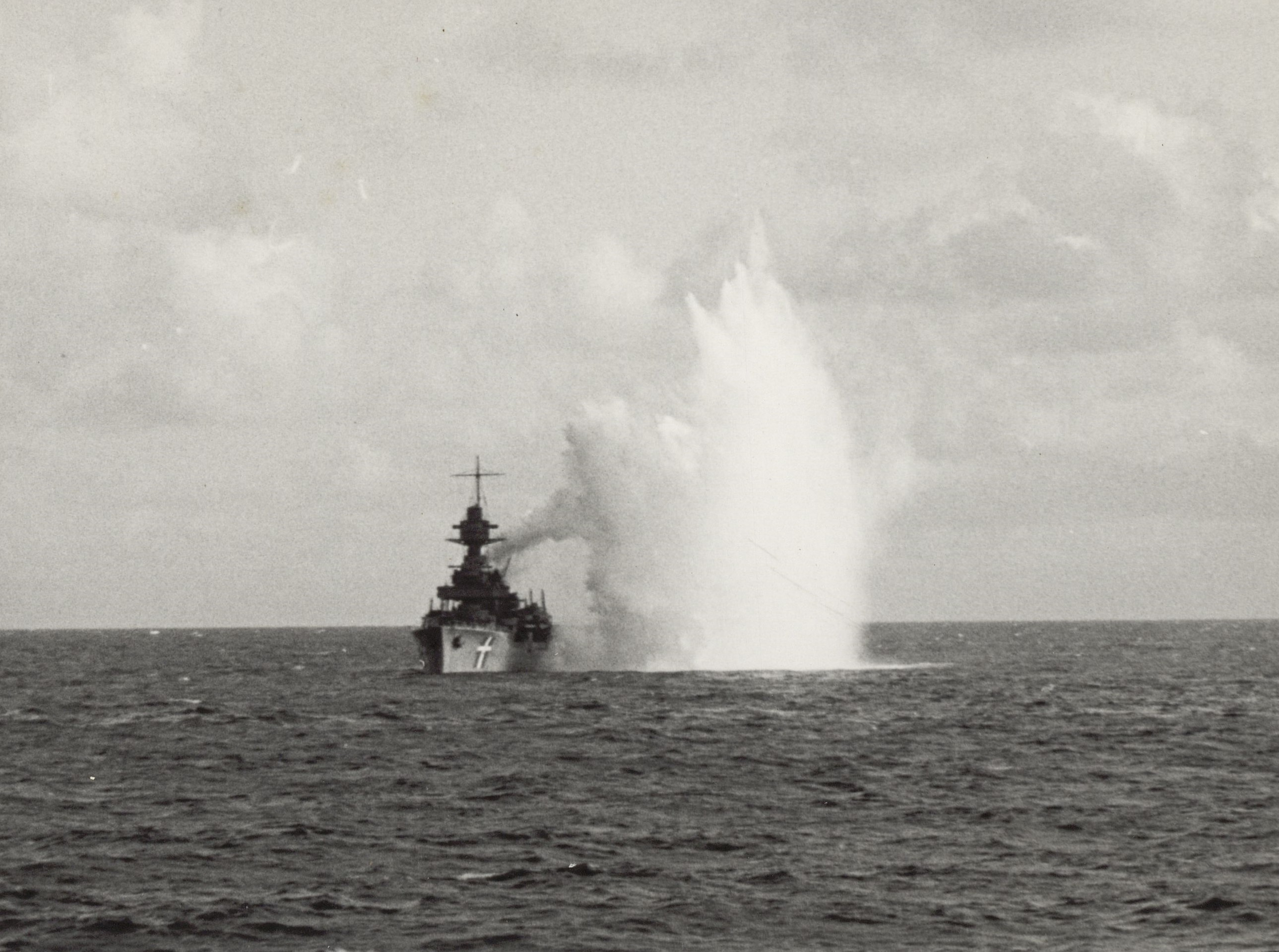
- Niels Juel under German Stuka attack in the Isefjord
Date	29 August 1943
Location	Isefjord, Denmark
Result	German victory

Belligerents
Denmark	(Nazi Germany) Germany

Commanders and leaders
(Denmark) Carl Westermann	(Nazi Germany) Unknown

Units involved
HDMS Niels Juel	

Strength
1 coastal defence ship ~300 sailors	1 mine warfare vessel 2 torpedo boats Unknown number of aircraft

Casualties and losses
1 killed 4 wounded Remainder captured 1 coastal defence ship grounded	At least 1 aircraft damaged

The Battle of Isefjord was a clash that occurred when the coastal defence ship HDMS Niels Juel was attacked by German forces as she tried to escape to neutral Sweden.

== Background ==
=== Danish political situation ===
By late August 1943, the political situation in Denmark was growing tense. Initially accepting their fate as a German protectorate, Danish actions against the German occupation were growing increasingly bold and disruptive after Axis defeats in the Soviet Union and the Mediterranean. On 28 August Germany issued an ultimatum to the Danish government, requiring them to suspend many civil liberties of the public and allow more German oversight into affairs concerning resistance activities. The Parliament deemed the demands unconstitutional, flatly refused, and subsequently handed in their resignations to King Christian X. The next day the Germans imposed martial law over the country and launched Operation Safari, aimed at seizing the Danish military assets.

However, the Royal Danish Navy had predicted this, and were under orders from Vice Admiral A. H. Vedel to make a run for Sweden, and if not possible, scuttle their ships.

=== Niels Juel ===
Niels Juel had spent the summer of 1943 on a training cruise in the Isefjord, the only place the Germans allowed the Danish Navy to operate unsupervised. On 27 August she received an order from Naval Command to be on alert and be prepared to lie on short notice to the Germans. The following evening Commander Carl Westermann held a meeting with the ship's officers. It was agreed that all sailors were to remain aboard and be ready to depart on short notice. On the morning of 29 August she was anchored in Holbæk.

== Attempted escape ==
=== Flight ===
Between 04:10 and 04:20 Niels Juel received three panicked messages from a secret radio transmitter in Copenhagen. General alarm was sounded, and the ship prepared to get under way. During this time a German aircraft reported the crew milling about the deck and steam coming from her funnels, well aware that Niels Juel intended to leave. After about an hour and a half delay caused by the weather, she made it out of Holbæk harbour.

Just before she departed, a local police officer came aboard to inform Commander Westermann that the Germans had occupied two local army barracks and two police stations, and that the naval units in Copenhagen had been scuttled.

Niels Juel headed north at a full steam of 15 knots, with her gun crews at the ready.

South of Lynæs Sand three German ships were spotted guarding the fjord. Also at this time several Stukas and other bombers began circling the ship's position. As she passed Hundested, she was relayed information that further orders were on the way from Naval Command. Commander Westermann ordered his crew to reduce speed and linger long enough to receive these new orders. These orders had in fact been forced by the Germans upon the Danes, and were on their way over to the port.

Before these new orders could be passed on, the local German commander in Hundested had received word that Niels Juel had, guns manned, been heading at full speed for the mouth of the fjord. He ordered the Luftwaffe to attack.

=== Battle ===
At 08:55, a German aircraft dropped two bombs off the starboard side and fired its machine guns. Believing this to be nothing more than a scare tactic, Commander Westermann told his crew to refrain from firing. As the ship turned south another aircraft made a strafing run, to which the Danes responded, damaging its right wing.

Westermann then denied a request from his senior gunnery officer to open fire on the German ships, and ordered his anti-aircraft artillery crews to seek shelter below deck.

The ship faced further attacks, reaching their climax at 09:35 when the German aircraft started dropping bombs again. Commander Westermann realized that the Germans were now trying to disable the ship, and called his anti-aircraft crews back. Reports from bystanders on land stated that a German aircraft later crashed after being hit by Danish anti-aircraft fire.

Finally, two bombs landed less than ten meters off the side of the ship, lifting her partially out of the water and spraying shrapnel up towards the anti-aircraft gunners. This last attack left five sailors wounded, one fatally, and knocked out the ship's electricity and fire control systems.

== Aftermath ==
Seeing as escape was now nearly impossible, Commander Westermann had the ship beached south of Nykøbing Sjælland. After an attempt to blow her up failed, all crucial supplies and equipment was thrown overboard or destroyed, and the sea valves were opened, flooding the lower decks.

The next day two torpedo boats carrying Wehrmacht soldiers seized the scuttled ship. The naval ensign was stricken, and Commander Westermann was informed that he would be facing sabotage charges in a German military court. The remaining crew was interned in Copenhagen.

The ship was later re-floated by the Germans and recommissioned under the name Nordland, before being scuttled by them in 1945.
