= Admiral Danish Fleet =

Coordinates: 56°09′15″N 10°05′41″E

- Søværnets Operative Kommando
- Active: 1 June 1961–30 September 2014
- Branch: Royal Danish Navy

The Admiral Danish Fleet (ADMDANFLT) (Danish: Søværnets Operative Kommando lit. 'The Navy's Operational Command') was the operationally supreme organisation of the Royal Danish Navy between 1 January 1991 and 30 September 2014.

== History ==
In 1961, following major restructuring of the Danish Navy, it was decide to collect all daily operational tasks under one command.

Following the 1988 Defence Commission, it was decided that the positions of Inspector of the Navy would be removed and the chief of the Admiral Danish Fleet would become the new Chief of the Royal Danish Navy.

== Commanders ==
No.	Portrait	Name (born–died)	Term of office			Ref.
No.	Portrait	Name (born–died)	Took office	Left office	Time in office	Ref.
1	Aage Linde	Rear admiral Aage Linde (1904–1980)	1 June 1961	31 March 1965	3 years, 303 days	
2	Adam Helms	Rear admiral Adam Helms (1912–2011)	1 April 1965	31 December 1969	4 years, 274 days	
3	Ole Brinck-Lund	Rear admiral Ole Brinck-Lund (1918–2008)	1 January 1970	30 April 1973	3 years, 119 days	
4	Niels Færgemann Lange	Rear admiral Niels Færgemann Lange (1919–2006)	1 May 1973	30 September 1974	1 year, 153 days	
5	Henrik Marius Petersen	Rear admiral Henrik Marius Petersen (1919–1978)	1 October 1974	2 May 1978 #	3 years, 213 days	
–	Helge Nielsen [da]	Commodore; Helge Nielsen (1921–2013); Acting	2 May 1978	31 May 1978	29 days	
6	Fritz Carl Heisterberg-Andersen	Rear admiral Fritz Carl Heisterberg-Andersen (1918–1984)	1 June 1978	30 September 1979	1 year, 121 days	
–	Tage Nikolaj Laursen	Commodore; Tage Nikolaj Laursen (1920–?); Acting	1 October 1979	31 October 1979	30 days	
–	Niels Færgemann Lange	Rear admiral Niels Færgemann Lange (1919–2006); Acting	1 November 1979	31 January 1980	91 days	
7	Sven Eigil Thiede [da]	Rear admiral Sven Eigil Thiede (1924–2005)	1 February 1980	30 April 1983	3 years, 88 days	
8	Johan Olfert Fischer	Rear admiral Johan Olfert Fischer (1925–?)	1 May 1983	30 September 1984	1 year, 153 days	
9	Jørgen Frits Bork	Rear admiral Jørgen Frits Bork (1927–2017)	1 October 1984	31 March 1988	3 years, 182 days	
10	Jørgen Garde	Rear admiral Jørgen Garde (1939–1996)	1 April 1988	31 October 1989	1 year, 213 days	
11	Knud Erik Johan Borck	Rear admiral Knud Erik Johan Borck (1940–2011)	1 November 1989	30 April 1995	5 years, 119 days	
12	Kristen Husted Winther	Rear admiral Kristen Husted Winther (born 1946)	1 May 1995	30 June 2000	5 years, 60 days	
13	Tim Sloth Jørgensen	Rear admiral Tim Sloth Jørgensen (born 1951)	1 July 2000	31 July 2002	2 years, 30 days	
14	Kurt Birger Jensen	Rear admiral Kurt Birger Jensen (born 1949)	1 August 2002	31 July 2005	2 years, 364 days	
15	Nils Christian Wang [da]	Rear admiral Nils Christian Wang (born 1958)	1 August 2005	31 August 2010	5 years, 30 days	
16	Finn Hansen [da]	Rear admiral Finn Hansen (born 1957)	1 September 2010	1 April 2013	2 years, 212 days	
–	Jan Leisborch	Flotilla admiral Jan Leisborch (born 1954); Acting	1 April 2013	15 April 2013	14 days	
17	Frank Trojahn	Rear admiral Frank Trojahn (born 1963)	15 April 2013	30 September 2014	1 year, 168 days	
