= Danish Brigade in Sweden =

Danish Brigade in Exile
- Den Danske Brigade
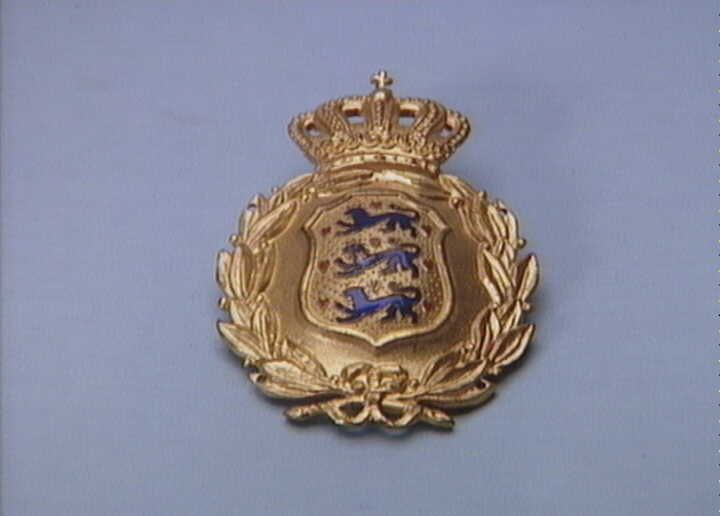
- Shield of the Danish Brigade.
- Active: 1943–1945
- Countries: Denmark; Sweden
- Allegiance: Denmark
- Branch: Royal Danish Army
- Engagements: Liberation of Denmark

Commanders
- Commander: Major general Kristian Knudtzon
- Deputy commander: Lieutenant colonel Frode Lund Hvalkof

Insignia
- War flag

- Roundel

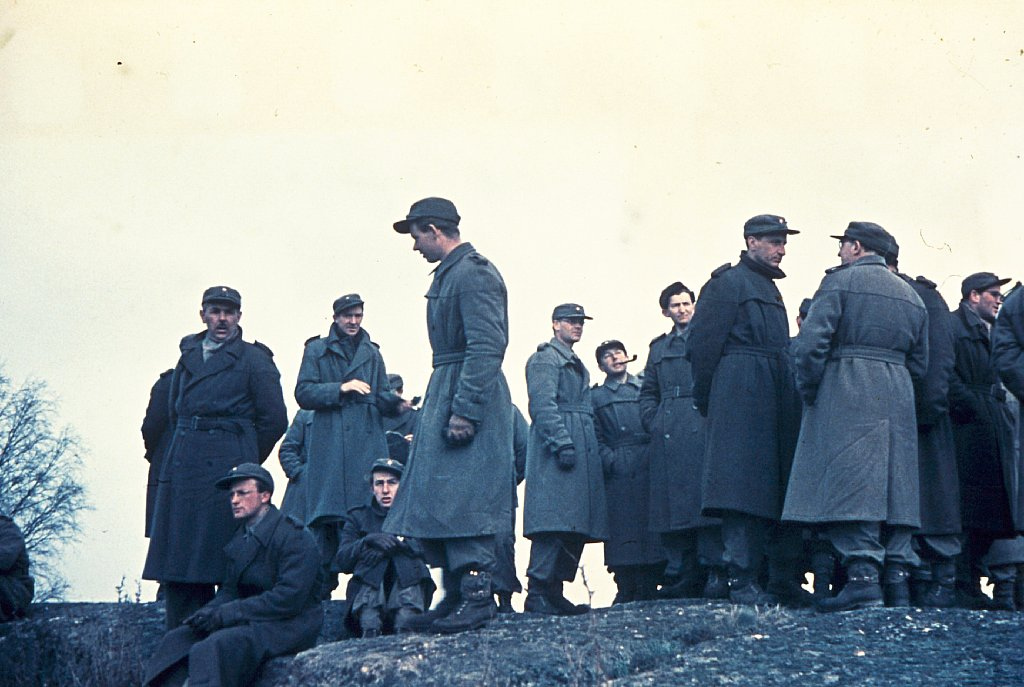
Soldiers of the Danish Brigade in Sweden, March 1945

The Danish Brigade in Sweden (Danish: Den Danske Brigade i Sverige) or in short, the Danish Brigade (Den Danske Brigade/DDB) (also referred to as Danforce) was a military unit made up of Danish refugees during World War II. Trained and supplied by Sweden, the brigade was created to help liberate Denmark. Ultimately it was only deployed on the day of the German surrender in the country and was involved in minimal fighting.

== Background ==
On 9 April 1940 Denmark was invaded by Nazi Germany and quickly surrendered. Most of the Danish Army followed the order to capitulate. Colonel Helge Bennike, the commander of the 4th Regiment based at Roskilde, believed that the order to surrender had been forced on the government by the Germans and that Sweden had also been attacked. Instead of surrendering, Bennike and his unit boarded the ferry in Elsinore to Sweden and went into exile. After the misunderstanding was later cleared up, most Danish soldiers stayed in Sweden while others returned to Denmark.

Following the transit of German troops through Sweden, Prime Minister Per Albin Hansson pushed for the training and equipping of 7,500 Danish "police troops." This was met with opposition in his cabinet, but a plan was eventually agreed upon in December 1943.

== History ==
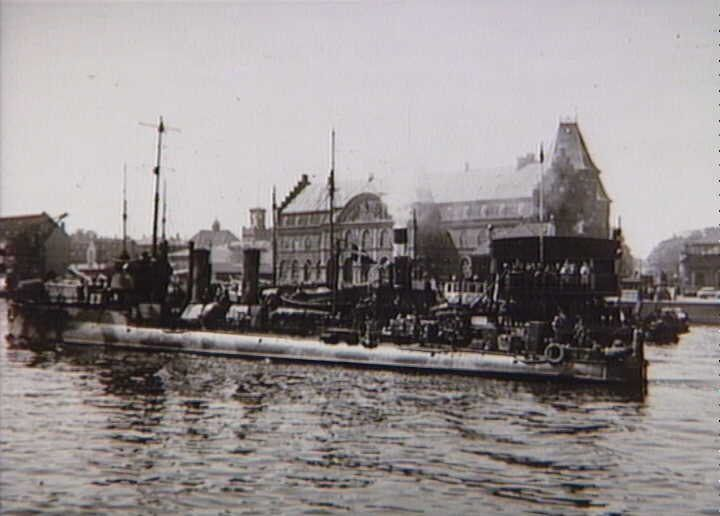
HDMS Havkatten of the Danish Flotilla in Copenhagen, May 1945

The Swedish government loaned 25 million kroner to the Danish legation to fund the training and arming of the Brigade. Enrollment was on a voluntary basis. The Danish soldiers from Roskilde formed the nucleus of the new force. Almost 5,000 Danes, including around 750 Jews who had escaped occupied Denmark, enlisted. The Danish soldiers were equipped with Swedish Mauser m/96 long rifles and bayonets.

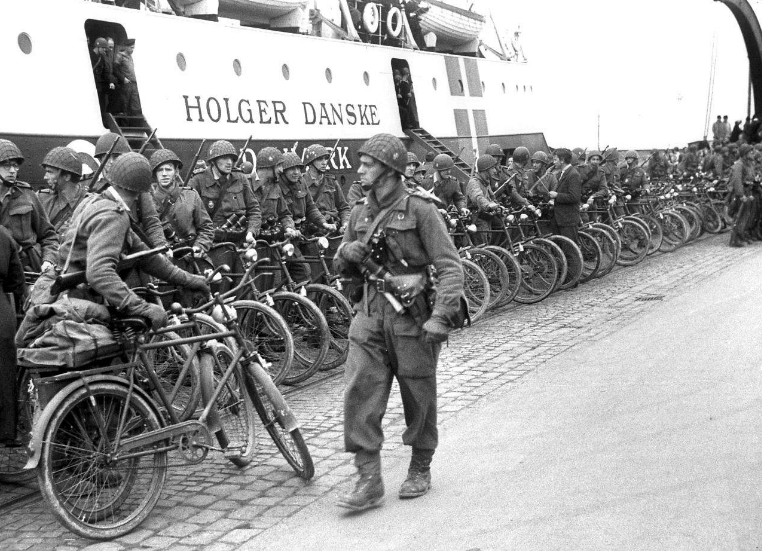
The Danish Brigade arrives in Helsingør, 5 May 1945

In the fall of 1944 the Swedish Air Force oversaw the training of Danish pilots at Såtenäs, who were subsequently organized into a squadron equipped with Saab 17 bomber-reconnaissance aircraft.

=== The Danish Flotilla ===
The Danish Flotilla (Danish: Den Danske Flotille) was formed with ships of the Danish Royal Navy that had escaped to Sweden.

=== Liberation of Denmark ===
The Swedish government delayed the deployment of the Brigade to Denmark so as to not complicate the surrender of German forces there. Most of the German occupation force surrendered without incident to Allied troops on 5 May. However, three Danish soldiers were killed, and 26 were wounded by snipers and ambushes, as they marched into Copenhagen.

== Legacy ==
Most of the officers of the Brigade were influenced by the Swedish military doctrine (which was based on German strategy) they learned during their exile and carried their knowledge over into the restructured Danish Army following the war. On the anniversary of Operation Safari in 1947, veterans of the Brigade erected a monument to the three soldiers killed during liberation near the Provincial Archive of Zealand in Copenhagen.

== Notable members ==
- Jørgen Hviid
- Gregers Münter
- Herbert Pundik

== See also ==
- Norwegian police troops in Sweden during World War II
