= Gustav Esmann =

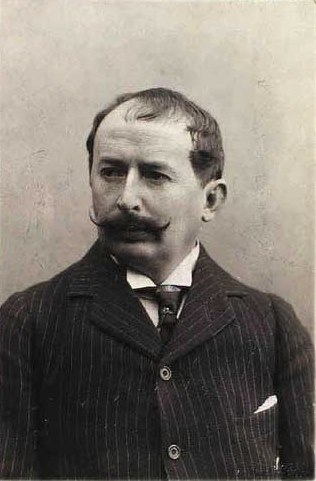
- Born: August 17, 1860; Copenhagen, Denmark
- Died: September 4, 1904 (aged 44); Copenhagen, Denmark
- Occupations: Journalist and author
- Spouse: Fanny Drewsen
- Parents: Niels Christian Esmann (father); Adelheid Nathalie Weber (mother)

Gustav Frederik Esmann (August 17, 1860 – September 4, 1904) was a Danish journalist, author, scriptwriter, and master of ceremonies.

Esmann was among those who joined Herman Bang's circle, and in the 1880s he attracted attention as a feature writer in the newspapers. He made his debut as an author in 1885 with Gammel Gæld (Old Debt), two short stories written in a blasé and ironic tone, and he wrote a dozen plays that were noted for their great technical stage finesse, including Den kjære Familje (The Dear Family, 1892) and Alexander den Store (Alexander the Great, 1900). Most of his plays were performed at the Royal Danish Theatre, and his last two were also performed in Sweden. In his lifestyle, Esmann was a typical representative of the "Copenhagen boulevard intelligentsia."

On September 4, 1904, Esmann was shot and killed at a hotel in Copenhagen by his mistress Karen Hammerich (1875–1904).
