= Erhard J.C. Qvistgaard =

HOMEMODE/ADMIRALSTATUS

Erhard J.C. Qvistgaard S.K.
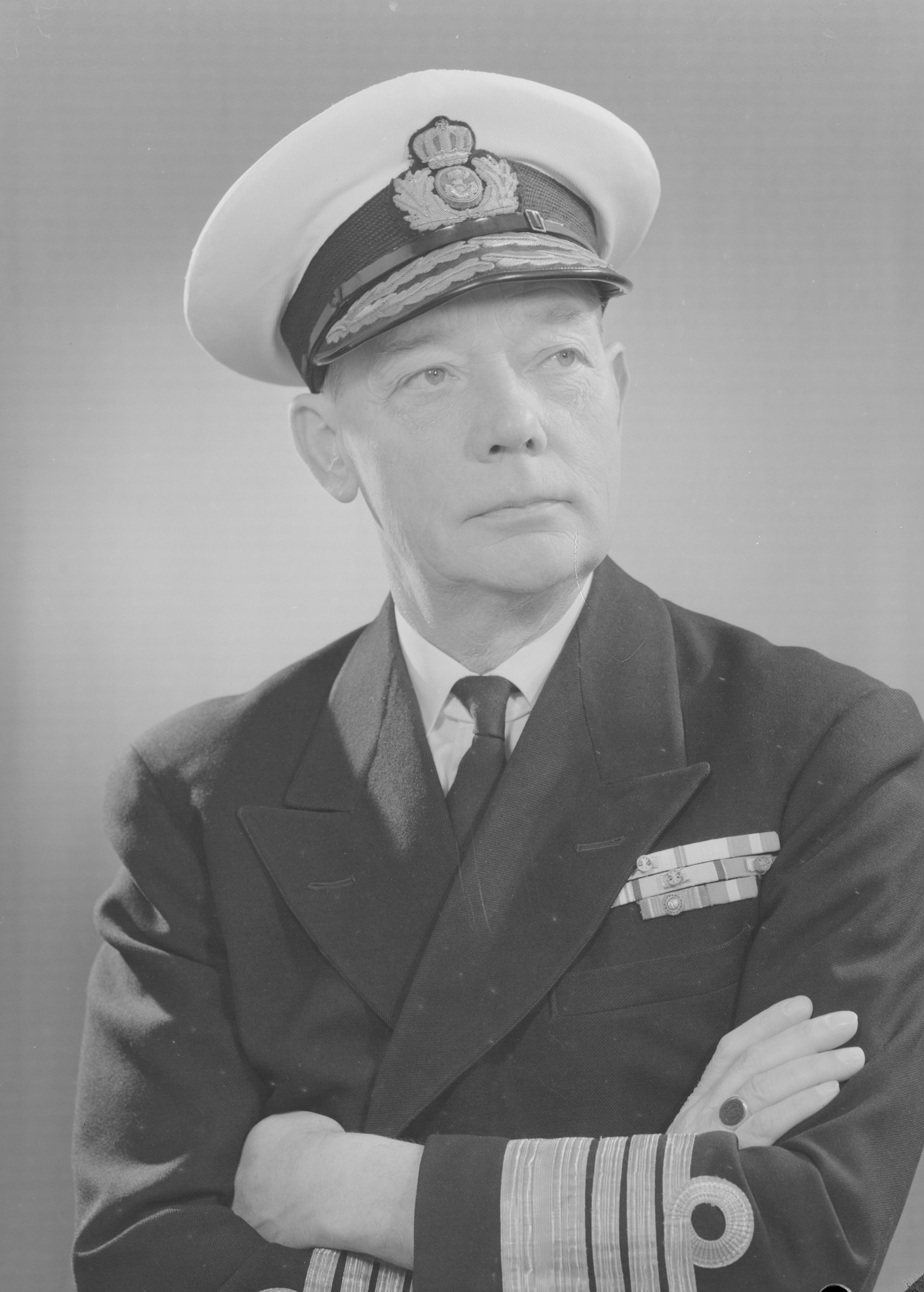

Chief of Defence
- In office 1 October 1950 – 30 September 1962
- Preceded by: Office established
- Succeeded by: Kurt Ramberg

Chairman of the NATO Military Committee
- In office 1953–1954
- Preceded by: Charles Foulkes
- Succeeded by: Augustin Guillaume

Personal details
- Born: Erhard Jørgen Carl Qvistgaard; 11 May 1898 Rorup, Denmark
- Died: 8 May 1980 (aged 81) Copenhagen, Denmark
- Resting place: Gilleleje Cemetery
- Later work: Board member of IBM Denmark

Military service
- Allegiance: Denmark
- Branch/service: Royal Danish Navy
- Years of service: 1919–1962
- Rank: Admiral
- Battles/wars: World War II

Admiral Erhard Jørgen Carl Qvistgaard (1898–1980) was a Danish admiral who was the first Danish Chief of Defence, from 1950 to 1962, and also Chairman of the NATO Military Committee from 1953 to 1954.

After training at the Naval Officers' School, Qvistgaard became a second lieutenant in 1919, a first lieutenant in 1920 and a lieutenant captain in 1928. In 1925-31 and again in 1935–38, he was commander of several of Denmark's submarines. In 1931-35 he was a teacher at the Naval Officers' School, and 1936-38 was a teacher at the submarine school for naval officers. In 1937 he became a naval captain, and from 1938 to 1945 he was an adjutant to King Christian X. In 1946, he was appointed Marine and Air Attaché at the Danish Embassy in London - a task he served in sufficiently such that the then-Minister of Defense Hans Rasmus Hansen sent him on to the United States in 1949 with the temporary rank of Rear Admiral to act as a naval attaché and to lead the Danish delegation to the Washington group that was planning and setting up NATO.

Qvistgaard was given the job as the first Danish Chief of Defence in 1950. He was given the task of uniting the armed forces after the war, where there had been major friction between the three branches. He is the longest serving CoD to date.

== Literature ==
- Bjerg, Hans Christian. "Qvistgaard, Erhard Jørgen Carl". In Svend Cedergreen Bech (ed). Danish biographical lexicon. 3rd edition. Copenhagen: Schultz, 1979–84. Volume 11.
- Lidegaard, Bo. In The King's Name: Henrik Kaufmann in Danish Diplomacy 1919-1958. Copenhagen: Samleren, 1996. ISBN 87-568-1377-5.

Military offices
| Preceded by Charles Foulkes | Chairperson of the Nato Military Committee; 1953–1954 | Succeeded by Augustin Guillaume |
| Preceded by None | Chief of Defence (Denmark); 1950–1962 | Succeeded by Kurt Rudolph Ramberg |
