= Operation Safari =

German military operation during World War II

- Part of the Occupation of Denmark
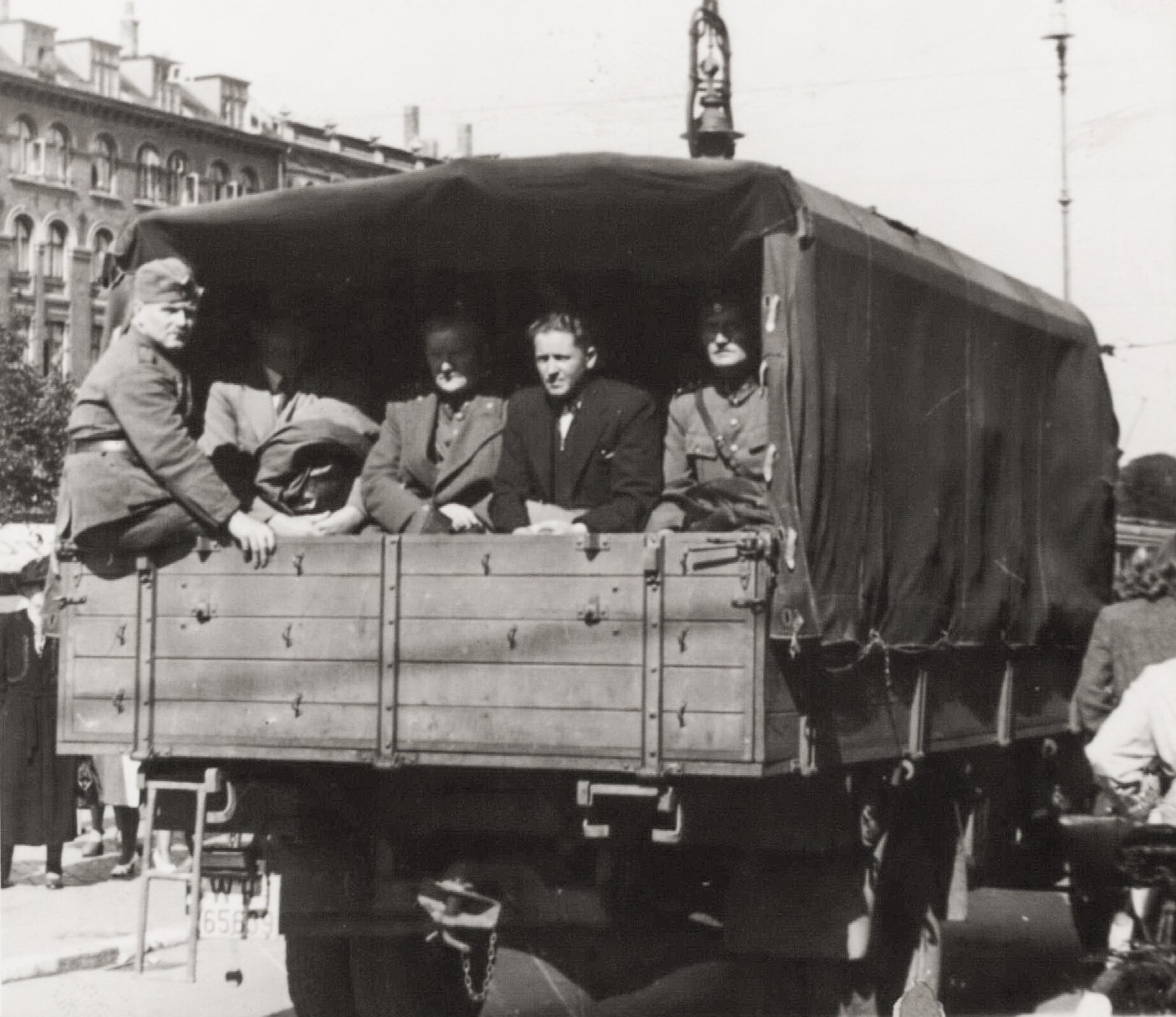
- Danish officers being detained on 29 August 1943
Date	29 August 1943
Location	Denmark
Result	German victory: Most Royal Danish Navy ships scuttled

Belligerents
Germany	Denmark

Commanders and leaders
(Nazi Germany) Hermann von Hanneken (Nazi Germany) Hans-Heinrich Wurmbach	(Denmark) Aage H. Vedel (Denmark) Ebbe Gørtz

Strength
9,000 soldiers 1 mine warfare ship 2 torpedo boats	2,200 soldiers 1,100 auxiliary troops 4,300 sailors 2 coastal defence ships 10 torpedo boats 7 minelayers 18 minesweepers 2 floating workshops 12 submarines 4 large patrol ships 2 survey ships 2 station vessels 1 royal yacht 59 patrol cutters 1 transport ship

Casualties and losses
1–11 killed 8–59 wounded At least 1 aircraft damaged	23–26 killed 40–50 wounded Other losses: 1 coastal defence ship grounded; 1 coastal defence ship scuttled; 4 torpedo boats scuttled; 1 torpedo boat blown up; 4 torpedo boats captured; 7 minelayers scuttled; 6 minesweepers scuttled; 9 minesweepers captured; 1 floating workshop torched; 9 submarines scuttled; 3 submarines captured; 1 large patrol ship scuttled; 3 large patrol ships captured; 1 survey ship captured; 2 station vessels captured; 50 patrol cutters captured; 1 transport ship captured

Operation Safari (German: Unternehmen Safari) was a German military operation during World War II aimed at disarming the Danish military. It led to the scuttling of the Royal Danish Navy and the internment of all Danish soldiers. Danish forces suffered 23–26 dead, around 40–50 injured, and 4,600 captured. Of the roughly 9,000 Germans involved, one was killed and eight wounded, although the number may have been 11 killed and 59 wounded.

== Background ==
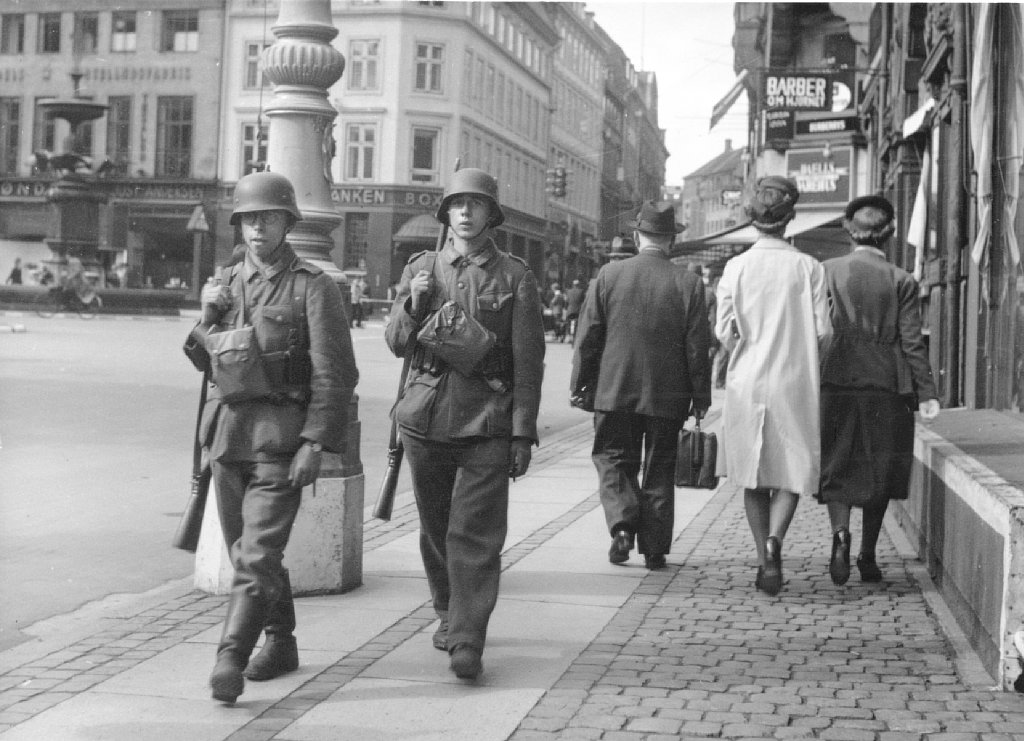
Germans on patrol at Højbro Plads following the declaration of martial law, 29 August 1943

During the early years of the war, Denmark had been known as the model protectorate, earning the nickname the Cream Front (German: Sahnefront), due to the relative ease of the occupation and copious amount of dairy products. General Hermann von Hanneken, the head of German land forces in Denmark, had wanted the Danish Army to be disarmed; if the Allies invaded, Danish forces could interfere with German supplies and communications. Plans to disarm the Danish Army were initially drafted in June 1943 and by July they were nearly ready.

Vice Admiral Hans-Heinrich Wurmbach, the senior German naval officer in Denmark, was opposed to the plan. The Danes were cooperative and the Danish Navy met many maritime responsibilities that would cost the Kriegsmarine resources and manpower to replace. The situation in Denmark deteriorated over the summer; on 28 July a Danish worker bombed a German freighter at the Odense shipyard. Tensions between the Germans—who had wanted to guard the ship—and Danish labourers increased, culminating in the "August uprising"; by the end of the month German and Danish authorities were unable to control the civil unrest in many cities across the country.

The Germans resolved at a late stage to disarm the Danish Navy; Wurmbach was unable to inform his subordinates of the operation until 16 August. Planning lasted until 26 August. The Germans declared Denmark "enemy territory" on 28 August. The Danish government was dissolved, Hanneken's plan was implemented and martial law was imposed.

== Operation ==
The objective of the operation was simultaneously to capture and disarm the entire Danish military, to prevent them from assisting a possible Allied invasion.

=== Army ===
The operation started at 04:00 and saw action taking place at every army base in Denmark. The Danes were taken by surprise and resistance was sporadic. At many places the soldiers surrendered peacefully but at others there was fighting. At the barracks in Næstved, where future Prime Minister Anker Jørgensen was stationed, two Danish soldiers lost their lives. When German forces tried to enter the armoury at the Shooting School for Handguns, an exchange of fire took place and three Germans were killed. The Danish royal family was at Sorgenfri Palace when the Germans, under the command of Lieutenant General Eduard Ritter von Schleich, attacked the palace, resulting in another skirmish and the death of seven Germans.

=== Navy ===
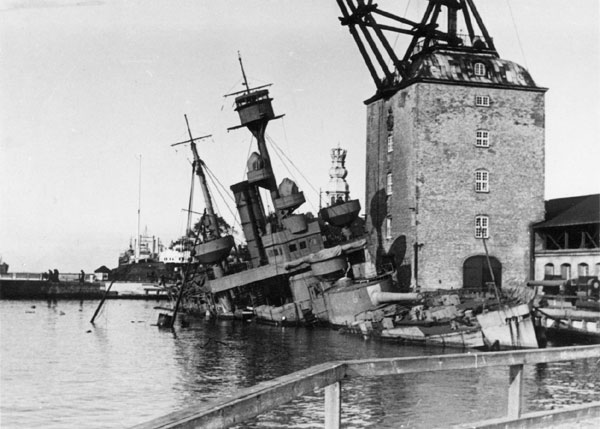
Peder Skram sunk in Copenhagen harbour

Following an incident, where the navy were forced to give six torpedo-boats to the Germans, the navy had planned the scuttling of its ships on 5 February 1941. Vice Admiral A. H. Vedel, the chief Danish naval officer, issued orders that in the event the Germans attempted to seize the fleet, crews were to attempt to sail for neutral Sweden or—if this was not possible—scuttle their ships. At 04:08, the message K N U was sent from the Danish Naval High Command, warning their crews that the German operation was about to begin. The first explosion occurred at 04:13 as the navy scuttled their ships in harbour, while ships at sea tried to escape to neutral or Allied waters. Niels Juel was intercepted and led to the Battle of Isefjord. Following their capture most naval personnel were interned at KB Hallen. Of the fifty-two vessels in the Danish Navy on 29 August, two were in Greenland, thirty-two were scuttled, four reached Sweden and fourteen were taken undamaged by the Germans. Nine Danish sailors were killed and ten were wounded, although the number may have been more.

== Bases and facilities attacked ==
- Hærens Geværfabrik/Ny Tøjhus
- Ammunitionsarsenalet
- Amager Barracks
- Bådsmandsstrædes Barracks
- Herluf Trollesgades Barracks
- Skydeskolen for Håndvåben
- Gernersgades Barracks
- Rosenborg Barracks
- Jægersborg Barracks
- Guard Hussar Barracks in Næstved
- Odense Barracks
- Nyborg Vandrehjem
- Hotel Nyborg Strand
- Gernersgades Barracks
- Sorgenfri Palace
- Holmen, Copenhagen
- Kongelundsfortet
- Middelgrundsfortet
- Flådestation Korsør
- Flådestation Nyborg

== Aftermath ==
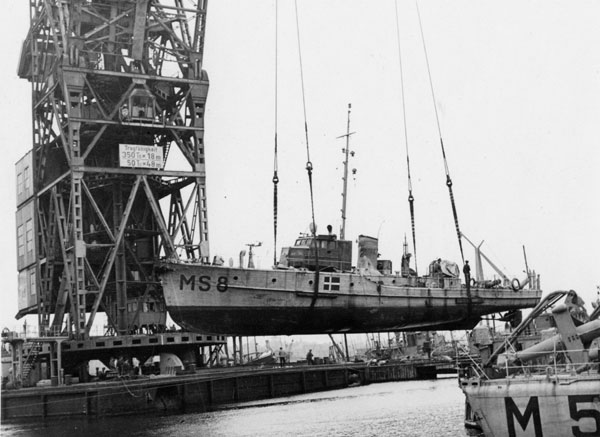
Salvaging of minesweeper MS 8

A total of 4,600 Danish personnel were captured, although some were later able to escape. Between 23 and 26 Danish personnel were killed and another 40 to 50 were injured. The Danes were able to scuttle 32 vessels, while six to thirteen escaped and fourteen were captured by the Germans. The Germans reported their own losses as one killed and eight wounded, although they may have been as high as 11 killed and 59 wounded.

"The Danish fleet has been sunk with honour. Long live the Danish Fleet"

— Commander Paul Ipsen, Head of the Danish Coastal Forces

The Germans had taken control of Denmark and could extend the Final Solution to the country, leading to the deportation and eventual rescue of the Danish Jews. Vice Admiral Vedel continued his service as Director of the Ministry of the Navy in the permanent secretaries' administration until liberation in 1945.

The Small General Staff was created, a Danish resistance movement composed of officers, with the aim of intelligence gathering. The soldiers that escaped to Sweden created the Danish Brigade in Exile, where they trained until the end of the war and returned to fight during the liberation. The ships that managed to escape became a part of the Danish Flotilla, while the Germans managed to refloat many of the ships sunk. The Germans also captured Horserød camp, where Danish communists were imprisoned. Approximately 150 of these were sent to Stutthof concentration camp in Germany.

=== Legacy ===
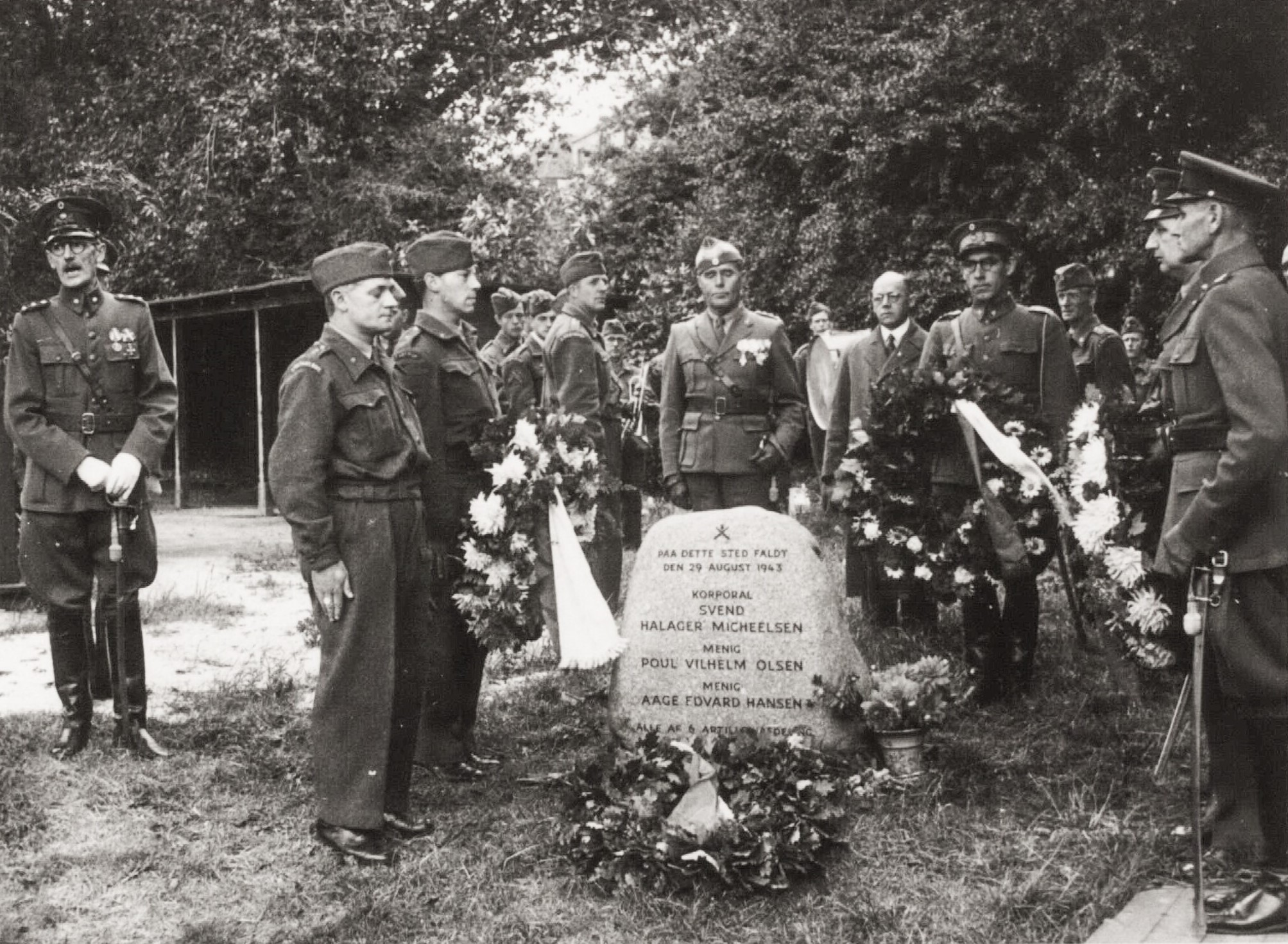
Commemoration at Ballonparken, 29 August 1946

On 29 August 2003, the Danish Prime Minister Anders Fogh Rasmussen delivered a speech before staff and students of the Royal Danish Naval Academy. He praised the scuttling of the navy and the resignation of the government during Operation Safari, asserting that the actions elevated the Allies' opinions of Denmark.

== See also ==
- Denmark in World War II
- Danish resistance movement
- Danish Brigade in Sweden
- Operation Anton
