= Quistgaard =

Quistgaard is a Danish surname. Notable people with the surname include:

- Georg Quistgaard (1915–1944), member of the Danish resistance movement
- Jens Quistgaard (1919–2008), Danish sculptor and designer
- Erik Quistgaard (1921-2013), Director-General of ESA
- Jacob Quistgaard, Danish guitarist
