= Admiral (Denmark) =

Highest military rank of the Royal Danish Navy

Admiral Admiral
- Admiral's rank flag (1979–present)

- Sleeve insignia (1951–present)

- Vehicle Star Plate
- Country: Denmark
- Service branch: Royal Danish Navy
- Abbreviation: Adm.
- Rank group: Flag officer
- Rank: Four-star
- NATO rank code: OF-9
- Pay grade: M406
- Formation: 1523
- Next lower rank: Viceadmiral
- Equivalent ranks: General

Admiral is the highest rank of the Royal Danish Navy. As a four-star rank it is the equivalent to the rank of general in the Royal Danish Army and Air Force.

The rank is rated OF-9 within NATO. It has the grade of M406 within the Ministry of Defence's pay structure. The rank of Admiral is reserved for the Chief of Defence and the King À la suite.

== History ==
Originally, admiral was not a rank, but rather a title given to the commander of any given naval force. It soon, however, changed to become an actual rank. On 25 May 1671, the rank was codified, by King Christian V, with the publication of the Danish order of precedence. Here admiral was placed below Lieutenant general admirals (Danish: General-Admiral-Lieutenant), and above Vice admirals (Danish: Vice-Admiral). In 1868, following the defeat in the Second Schleswig War, it was decided to collect all admiral ranks into one "Admiral", as part of the major cuts made to the Danish military. This new rank was only allowed for the King and the chief of the Naval Officers' Corps. In 1880, the ranks of vice admiral and counter admiral were reintroduced. At the same time, the rank of admiral was made exclusively for royalty. The rank was reintroduce for fleet officers in 1950, following the decision to award the rank to naval officers promoted to Chief of Defence.

== Insignia ==
The first uniforms for the Navy was introduced in 1722, though they did not have any insignia. In 1771, the first insignia was introduced for admirals. These were gold rings on the cuffs, with three for full admirals, two for vice admirals, and one for counter admirals. This insignia was however removed before proper introduction as Christian VII wished to introduce epaulettes. However, after the fall of Johann Friedrich Struensee, the old ranks were reintroduced promptly.

In 1801, epaulettes were introduced for all officers of the Navy. In 1841, new insignia was introduced for all officers. With the advent of steamship, epaulettes quickly became dirty and were in general cumbersome. As a result, they were removed for daily wear, and were replaced by smaller lace epaulettes. In 1871, sleeve insignia was introduce in favour of epaulettes.

Following the end of World War II, the navy began more international cooperation, the admiral ranks were seen as excessive compared to other nations and its relative size. Sleeve insignia was changed to look more like the insignia of the Royal Navy.

=== Rank insignia ===
Rank insignia for Admiral

Sleeve insignia (1871–1880)

... (1880–1951)

... (1951–present)
Rank flag for Admiral

?–1979

1979–present

== See also ==
- List of Danish full admirals
- Ranks and insignia of Royal Danish Navy
- Admiral (Sweden)
