= A. H. Vedel =

Danish naval officer and geographer (1894–1981)

Aage Helgesen Vedel
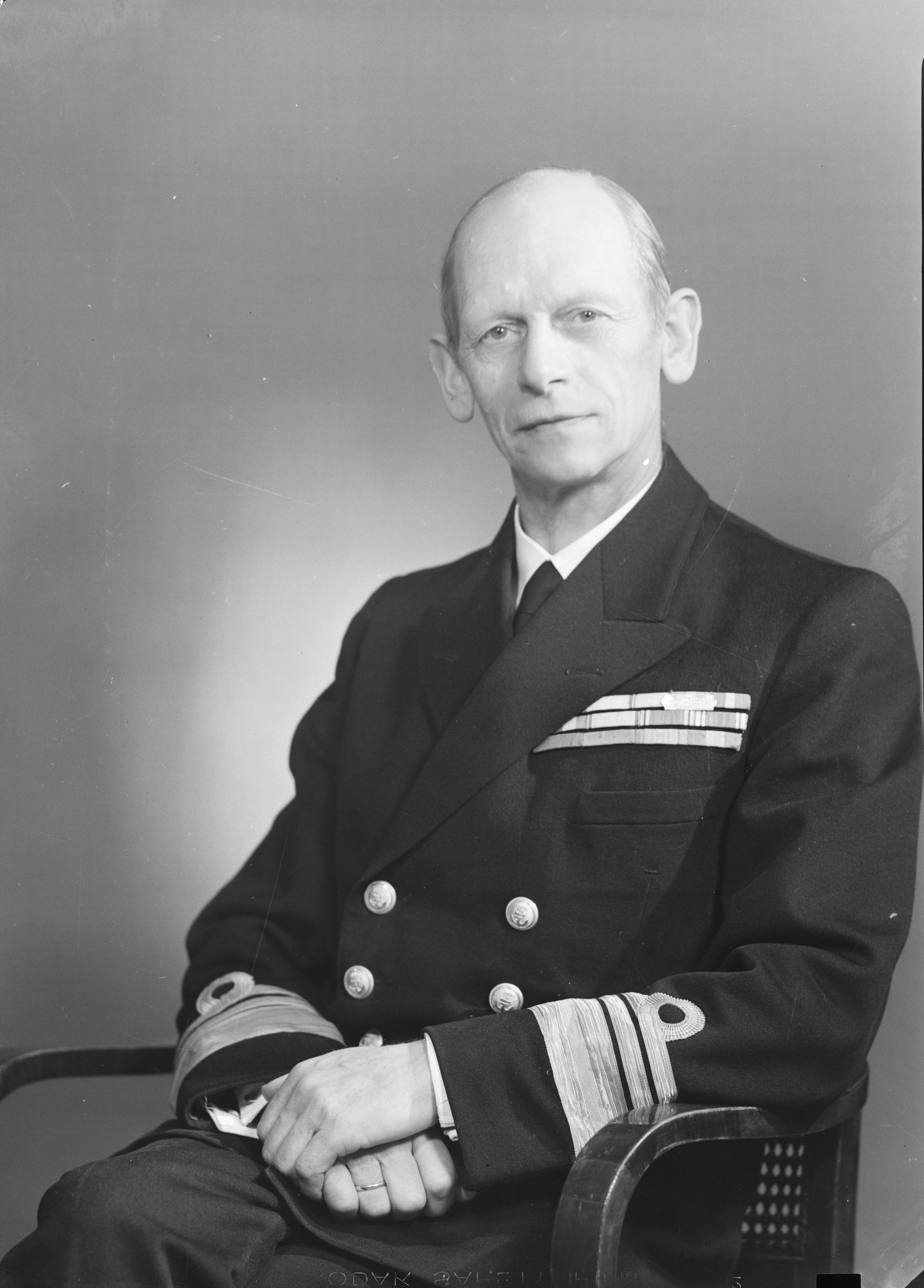
- Born: 1 September 1894; Copenhagen, Denmark
- Died: 9 February 1981 (aged 86); Hellerup, Denmark
- Burial place: Hørsholm Churchyard, Hørsholm
- Military career
- Allegiance: Denmark
- Branch: Royal Danish Navy
- Service years: 1912–1958
- Rank: Vice-Admiral
- Commands: HDMS Delfinen; HDMS Lindormen; HDMS Nordkaperen; HDMS Henrik Gerner; HDMS Nordstjernen; HDMS Flyvefisken; HDMS Argus; HDMS Godthaab; HDMS Høgen; Deputy Head of Marine Staff; Chief of Navy Command; Director General of Ministry of Marine; Commander-in-chief of the Navy; Danish Flag Officer to NATO
- Conflicts: Second World War: Operation Safari
- Awards: Gerner medal, Medal of Merit (2nd class), Knight Grand Commander of the Order of the Dannebrog, Galathea Commemoration Medal, Vitus Bering Commemoration Medal

Vice-Admiral Aage Helgesen Vedel (1 September 1894 – 6 February 1981) was a Royal Danish Navy officer who served as chief of the Naval Command from 1941 until 1958. During World War II, he succeeded in scuttling most of the Danish navy's ships before they could fall into German hands.

== Personal biography ==
Aage Helgesen Vedel was born to Helge Vedel and Charlotte Serene on 1 September 1894 in Copenhagen, Denmark. Helge Vedel was a lieutenant in the Danish Navy and deputy director of the Naval Dockyard.

On 18 December 1921, Vedel married Kirsten Lützen.

He died on 9 February 1981 and was buried at the Hørsholm Churchyard.

== Military service ==
A. H. Vedel joined the Danish Navy as a cadet in 1912.

=== World War II ===
At the time of the German invasion of Denmark, Vedel was the Deputy Head of Marine Staff. The navy did not take part in the fighting, and was left in place by the Germans after the conflict. From 25 July 1941, Vedel served as acting Chief of Navy Command and Director General of the Ministry of Marine until both these positions were affirmed to him on 1 September, making him the commander-in-chief of the Royal Danish Navy.

Though initially peaceful, the occupation of Denmark began to turn more turbulent as the Danish Resistance increased its activities. With relations between Germany and Denmark breaking down, Admiral Vedel summoned high-ranking Danish naval officers to the Naval Ministry at 22:00 on 27 August 1943. He briefed them on the political situation and went through several plans of action for the Danish Navy, in the event it were attacked by the Germans. The next day the Danish Parliament responded to a demanding German ultimatum by resigning. With no government over the country, the Germans moved quickly to gain total control in Denmark. On 29 August, the Germans launched Operation Safari in an attempt to seize the Danish Navy and intern all Danish military personnel. Admiral Vedel ordered all ships to head to neutral Sweden or—if escape was not possible—be sunk at their moorings. Danish sailors managed to successfully scuttle the majority of the fleet before they were interned. Following the operation, the senior-most German naval officer in Denmark, Vizeadmiral Hans-Heinrich Wurmbach, told Vedel, "We have both done our duty." The Germans temporarily dissolved the Danish military.

With the Danish government and navy gone, Vedel established contact with the Danish Resistance and began supplying them intelligence. In early 1945 he began secret talks with the British Admiralty on post-war plans for the Danish navy. On 5 May the German forces in Denmark capitulated to the British, and Admiral Vedel immediately began working with British Vice-Admiral Reginald Vesey Holt to supervise German disarmament and minesweeping work. The Germans, unwilling to recognize the Danes as victors, chose to only take orders from the British, outraging Vedel and his staff.

=== Later career ===
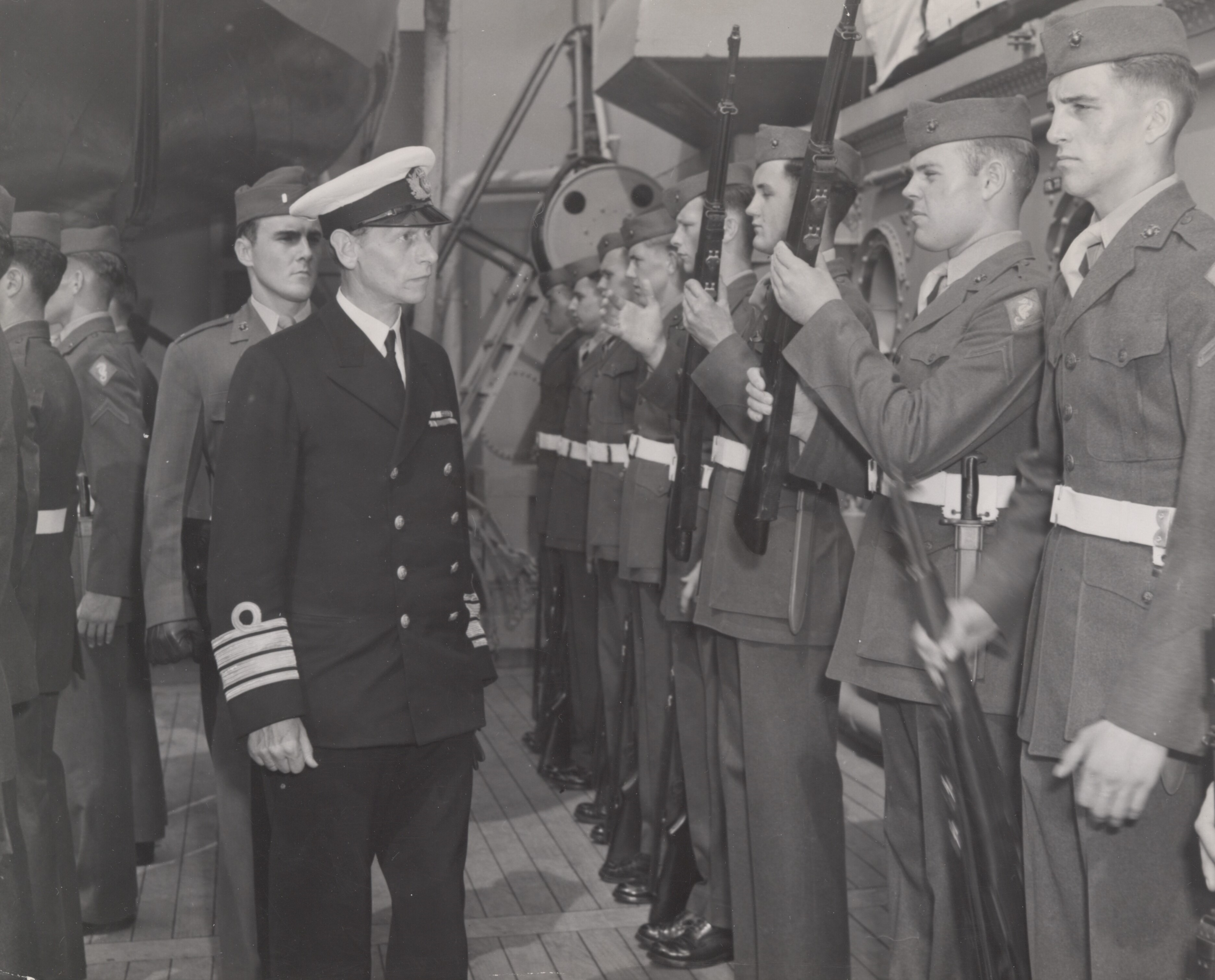
A. H. Vedel on board the USS Houston (CL-81), 1946

In January 1947, Vedel served as chair of the committee that oversaw Denmark's resumption of control over Greenland from the United States. Also that year the Danish government became increasingly worried that Cold War tensions could compromise the openness of the Danish Straits, so Admiral Vedel initiated conversation with Norway and Sweden about a potential defense pact. Vedel secretly traveled to the United Kingdom in May to discuss the ongoing talks.

In 1950, A. H. Vedel became Denmark's representing flag officer to NATO. In 1952 he commanded the royal yacht HDMY Dannebrog on a cruise to Greenland with King Frederik IX and Queen Consort Ingrid. Vedel retired from the navy on 31 May 1958.
