= Frank Trojahn =

Frank Trojahn Rear Admiral
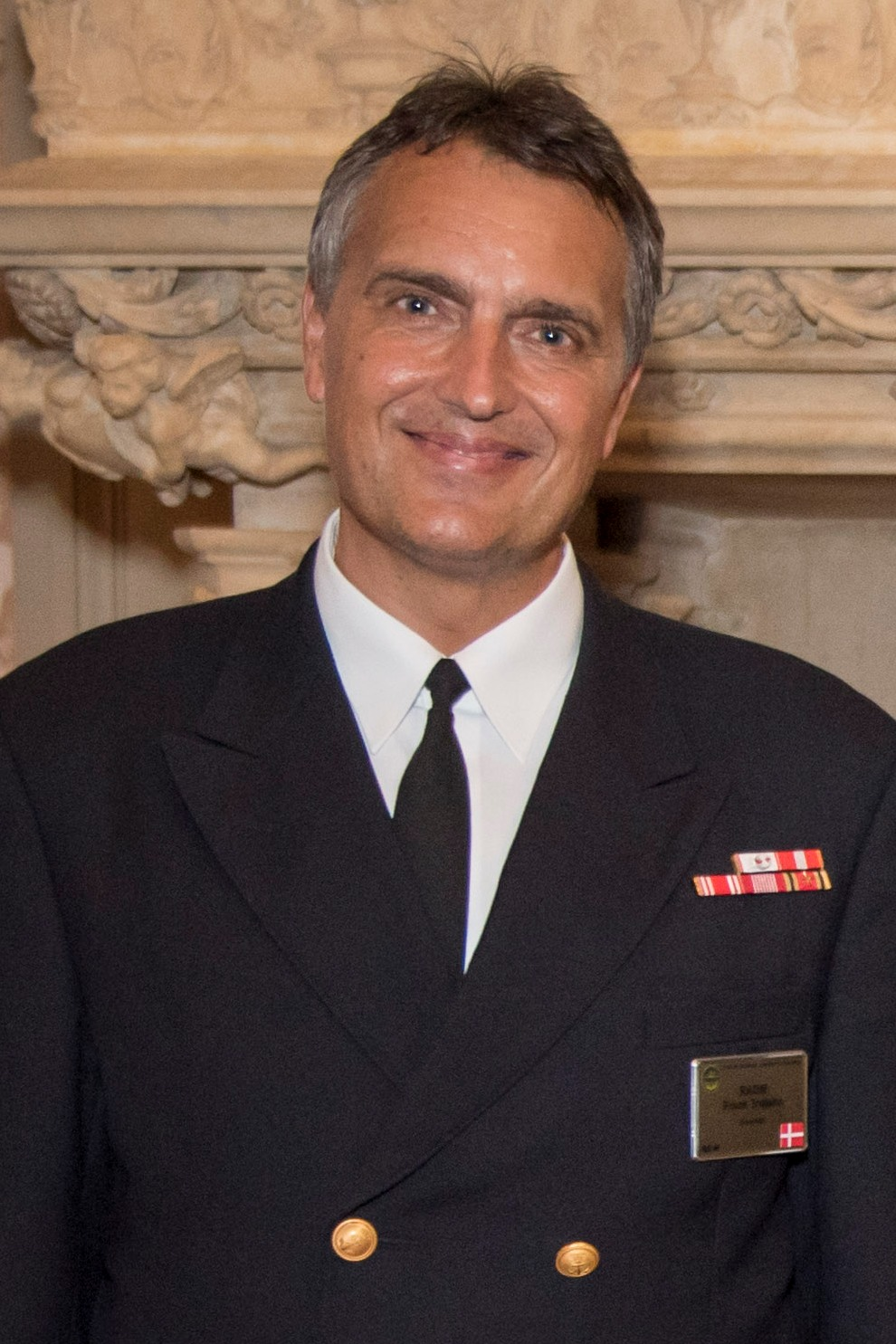
- Born: 20 August 1963 (age 62); Sønderborg, Denmark
- Allegiance: Denmark
- Branch: Royal Danish Navy
- Service years: 1983-
- Rank: Rear admiral
- Commands: Defence attaché at the Royal Danish Embassy in Washington D.C; Chief of Staff Plans and Capabilities; Chief of the Royal Danish Navy; Support Ship ABSALON; 2nd Squadron, Royal Danish Navy
- Awards: Order of the Dannebrog; Order of Merit of the Federal Republic of Germany; Ordre National de la Légion D´Honneur

Frank Trojahn (born 20 August 1963) is a Danish naval officer and Rear admiral in the Royal Danish Navy.

As of 2021, Trojahn is defence attaché at the Royal Danish Embassy in Washington D.C. The defence attaché reports to the Danish Ministry of Defence, other military authorities, and the Danish Ministry of Foreign Affairs on the position of the United States and Canada with regards to defence and national security policy. Other responsibilities include assisting in foreign military sales.

== Biography ==
Trojahn is from Sønderborg, close to the Danish-German border. He graduated from the Royal Danish Naval Academy in 1986. He went on to complete the Junior Staff Course of the Danish Defence Academy, a Maritime tactical Course in the United Kingdom, and a Mine Warfare Staff Officers Course in Belgium. He completed the German Staff Course in 1999 and was promoted to Flag Rank in 2013 when he was appointed Admiral Danish Fleet.

At sea, Trojahn began his career in minelayers and minesweepers serving as Executive and Commanding Officer. In 2007 he was appointed Commanding Officer of the frigate HDMS Absalon. During his tour as Commanding Officer, the Absalon was deployed on its first operational deployment when it served as Flag Ship of Task Force 150 under the Combined Maritime Forces in Bahrain. The mission was primarily counter piracy operations near the Horn of Africa. Upon completion of his tour of duty as Commanding Officer, he was promoted to captain and assumed command of the 2nd Danish Squadron, where the Iver Huitfeldt and Absalon-class frigates are organized.

Ashore, Trojahn has served in the Danish Ministry of Defence and as Deputy Defence Attaché at the Royal Danish Embassy in Berlin, Germany. He has served as both Branch and Division head within Defence Planning in the Danish Defence Command.

In 2013 he was promoted to Rear Admiral and was appointed Admiral Danish Fleet (Chief of the Royal Danish Navy). During his time in command, a new training regime was incorporated within the Royal Danish Navy, when it was decided to use the British Royal Navy's Flag Officer Sea Training syllabus to improve the combat effectiveness of the major Danish warships. Furthermore, an agreement was reached to deploy an Iver Huitfeldt-class frigate to a US Carrier Strike Group.

During his time as Admiral Danish Fleet, Trojahn also served as Commander of a Danish-Norwegian-UK Task Force, which was the maritime part of the operation to remove and destroy Syria's chemical weapon stockpiles in 2013–2014.

In 2017, Trojahn transferred to the Danish Defence Command as Chief of Staff Plans and Capabilities. In this capacity he has overseen defence planning, policy, strategy and capability development including implementation of defence agreements.

In addition to campaign medals, Trojahn's personal awards include French and German awards as well as the Danish Commander of the order of Dannebrog.

Trojahn is married to Christina Trojahn; they have two adult daughters.

== Awards and decorations ==
- Commander of the Order of the Dannebrog (2014)
- Medal of Merit, 25 years of service in the Navy
- Defence Medal for International Service
- Defence Medal for International Service (1948-2009)
- Medal of Merit of the Home Guard
- Order of Merit of the Federal Republic of Germany, 1st class
- Class of The Nordic Blue Berets Medal of Honour, Silver
- Ordre National de la Légion D´Honneur, Officer
