= Carl van Dockum =

Danish admiral and politician (1804–1893)

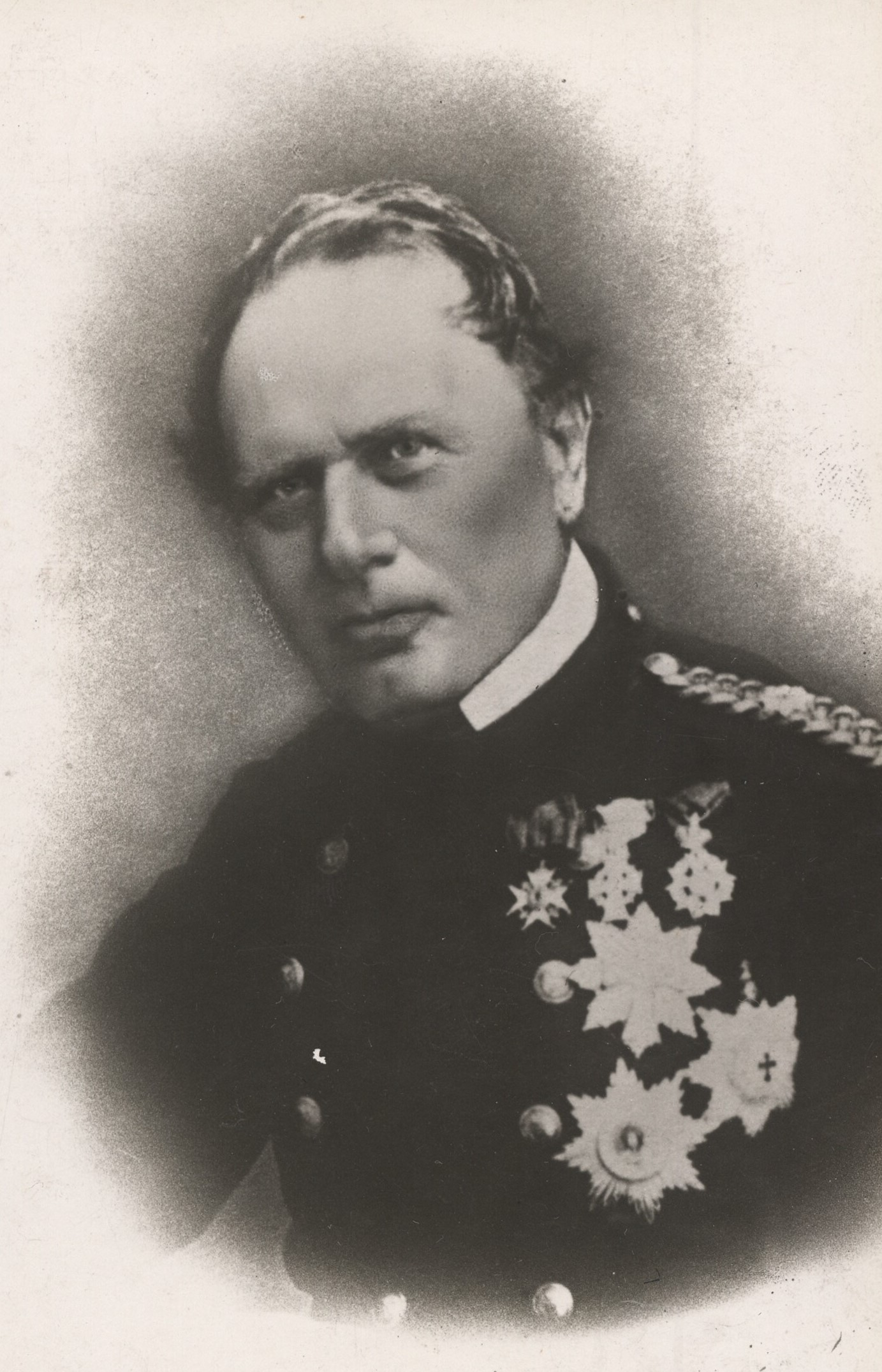
- Born: 28 February 1804; Copenhagen, Denmark-Norway
- Died: 29 January 1893 (aged 88); Helsingør, Helsingør Municipality, Denmark
- Burial place: Holmen Cemetery, Østerbro, Copenhagen, Denmark
- Military career
- Allegiance: Denmark; Kingdom of France
- Branch: Royal Danish Navy
- Service years: 1821–1874
- Rank: Vice-Admiral
- Conflicts: Greek War of Independence: Battle of Navarino; First Schleswig War; Second Schleswig War: Battle of Jasmund

Vice-Admiral Carl Edvard van Dockum (28 February 1804 – 29 January 1893) was a Danish naval officer and politician best known for his participation in the Battle of Jasmund in the Second Schleswig War.

== Biography ==
Carl Edvard van Dockum was the son of Vice Admiral Jost van Dockum and his wife. He began as early as 1815 at the Søofficersuddannelsen, which he completed as a second lieutenant with HM the King's Honorary Saber in 1821. After a voyage to the West Indies, van Dockum went, with a passport, into French service, where he excelled in several battles such as the Battle of Navarino, and ended up being decorated with the Legion of Honor. At the end of 1829, he returned to Denmark, where he had been promoted to first lieutenant the year before.

After service as an enlistment officer, and on various ships, he became adjutant to the Governor-General of the Danish West Indies possessions in 1840, as well as the harbor master at St. Croix and military secretary at the General Government. It was under Peter von Scholten, where van Dockum proved to be a capable and tactful negotiator, during a dispute with the government of the island of Puerto Rico, which he got settled in a way that satisfied both parties.

After returning home in 1846, he was appointed head of the Royal Danish Naval Academy, and in 1847, he became captain. During the First Schleswig War, in 1848, van Dockum led the corvette Flora on a blockade in the Baltic Sea, but was recalled to participate in the Danish Constituent Assembly as a member appointed by the king.

On 25 November 1850, van Dockum was briefly appointed Minister of the Navy in the Ministry of Moltke IV, a post he regained in 1866-1867 in the Ministry of Frijs.

From 1855 to 1857, van Dockum was a Member of Parliament representing Aarhus, after which he was sent to England in 1857. In 1859, he was again offered the post of Minister of the Navy, but refused, and in 1860, he rejoined the Navy as counter admiral. At the outbreak of Second Schleswig War, he was commander-in-chief of the navy in the eastern part of the Baltic Sea.

Shortly after his most recent ministry, van Dockum was appointed Chief of the Naval Officers Corps and Vice Admiral, which he remained until his retirement on 1 June 1874.

He settled in Strandgade Helsingør and in 1888, published a book entitled Gamle Minder fra Tjenesteaarene om Bord i franske Skibe 1823-29, Ernst Bojesens Forlag København written down in 1877 by C. van Dockum.

Dockum was promoted to squire in 1823, Chamberlain in 1851, became a Knight of the Dannebrog in 1843, Commander of the Dannebrog in 1853 and the Grand Cross in 1860.

He is buried in Holmen Cemetery. His surviving papers are in the Danish National Archives.

There is a portrait painting by August Schiøtt in 1850 in the Frederiksborg Museum, a Miniature of wife Louise van Dockum b. Bauditz made by F.C. Camradt in June 1833 in family ownership, a Portrait of Frederik Christian Lund's painting Paa Søen 1853 on board "Dannebrog" ( lithograph hereafter) and woodcut drawings by Henrik Olrik in 1864, 1871, and 1893.
