= À la suite =

German honorary military officer

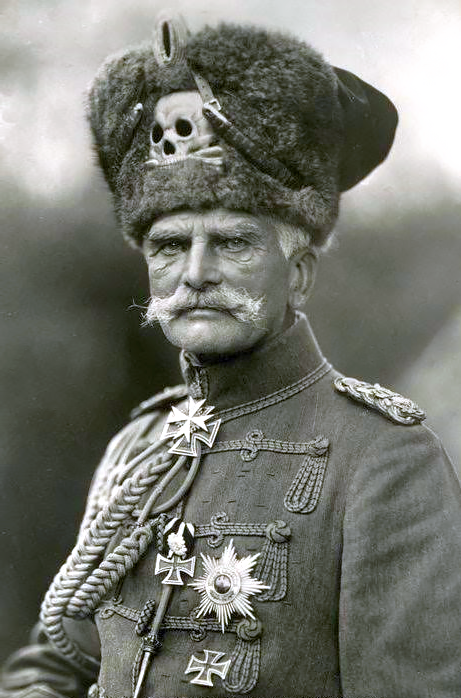
Field marshal August von Mackensen wearing à la suite the uniform of the 1st Life Hussars Regiment of the Prussian Army.

À la suite (French pronunciation: [a la sɥit], in the entourage [of]) was a military title given to those who were allotted to the army or a particular unit for honour's sake and were entitled to wear a regimental uniform but otherwise had no official position.

In Prussia, these were:

- À la suite of the army - such as those granted to such officers who came to command non-Prussian battalions at certain higher ranks to guarantee their advancement in the Prussian army
- À la suite of regiments - such as princes and generals as a special honour or officers who commanded non-Prussian battalions.

Officers and others (for example, surgeons were "à la suite of a Sanitätskorps") were thus not inserted into the military command structure but rather had roles in the administration, military direction (war ministry or similar positions) or military education. Also, men could be "à la suite of his majesty" if they directly worked for the ruler.

For example, German Fieldmarshal August von Mackensen was granted à la suite the distinctive death's head uniform of the 1st Life Hussars Regiment (Leib-Husaren-Regiment Nr. 1), which he commanded between 1893 and 1898.
