= Allied leaders of World War II =

Political and military leaders of the Allied nations during World War II

The final leaders of the Allies at the Potsdam Conference in 1945: Clement Attlee, Harry S. Truman, and Joseph Stalin.

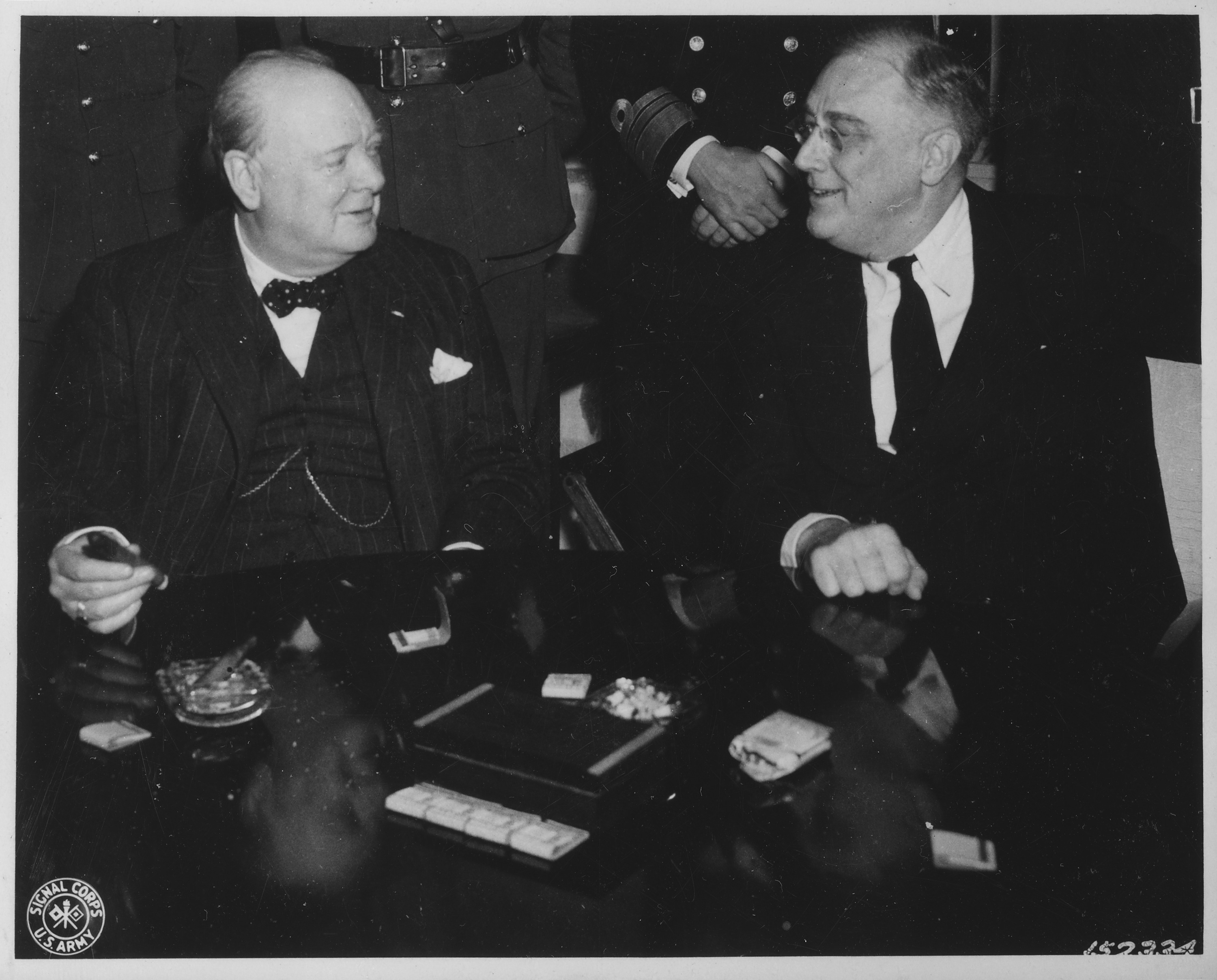
US President Franklin D. Roosevelt and British Prime Minister Winston Churchill during the Casablanca Conference, January 1943.

Chiang Kai-shek, Roosevelt, and Churchill at the Cairo Conference, 25 November 1943.

The Allied leaders of World War II listed below comprise the important political and military figures who fought for or supported the Allies during World War II. Engaged in total war, they had to adapt to new types of modern warfare, on the military, psychological and economic fronts.

== Free Albania ==
- Enver Hoxha was the leader of the Communist Party of Albania, which led the Albanian National Liberation Movement to a struggle in Albania under Italy and Germany.

== Kingdom of Belgium ==
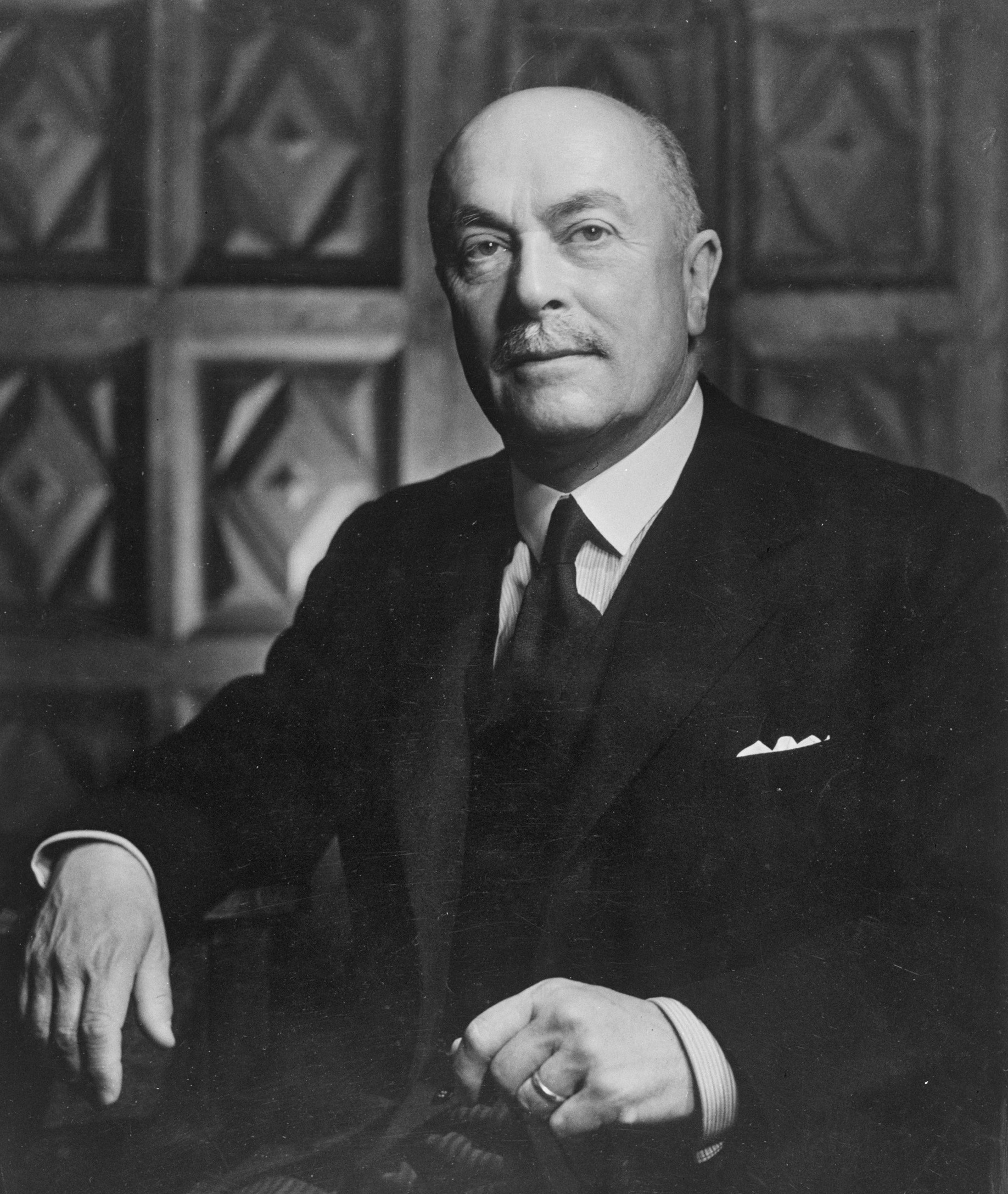
Hubert Pierlot, the prime minister of Belgium between 1939 and 1945, and leader of the Belgian government in exile

- Leopold III of Belgium reigned as King of the Belgians from 1934 until 1951. Prior to the war Leopold had made extensive preparations against such an invasion of his country. After Belgium's surrender Leopold stayed to face the invaders, while his entire government had fled to Great Britain but, although he rejected cooperation with the German occupiers he also refused to actively resist many of their policies. He was held under house-arrest in Belgium for much of the war. Because the refusal to follow the orders of his government violated the Constitution, he was declared "unable to rule" and the issue sparked a post-war political crisis.
- Hubert Pierlot was the prime minister of Belgium from 1939 until 1945. Pierlot became the leader of the government during the Phoney War until the German invasion. Pierlot fled to Britain where he led the Belgian government in exile and presided over the formation of the Free Belgian forces. Despite his conservative politics, Pierlot denounced the surrender of Leopold III and officially suspended his reign in 1940 by invoking a clause in the Belgian Constitution. The disagreement created a lasting animosity between the Royalist faction in Belgium and the exiled government in London.
- Pierre Ryckmans was Governor-General of Belgium's principal African colony, the Belgian Congo, for the duration of the war. Along with the Minister of the Colonies, Albert de Vleeschauwer, Ryckmans brought the Congo into the war on the Allied side, amid worries that the colony might follow the lead of Leopold III in Belgium and attempt to remain neutral. During Ryckmans' period in office, Congolese troops were sent to support British forces in East Africa and the Congo made a substantial economic contribution to the Allied war effort.
- Victor van Strydonck de Burkel was a general of the Belgian Army who commanded the 1st Military Zone during the invasion of Belgium. After Belgium's surrender in 1940, he became the Commander of Belgian forces in Great Britain, and presided over the formation of the Free Belgian forces. After the liberation of Belgium he became the Chief of the Belgian Military Mission to Supreme Headquarters Allied Expeditionary Force.

== Brazil (1942–1945) ==
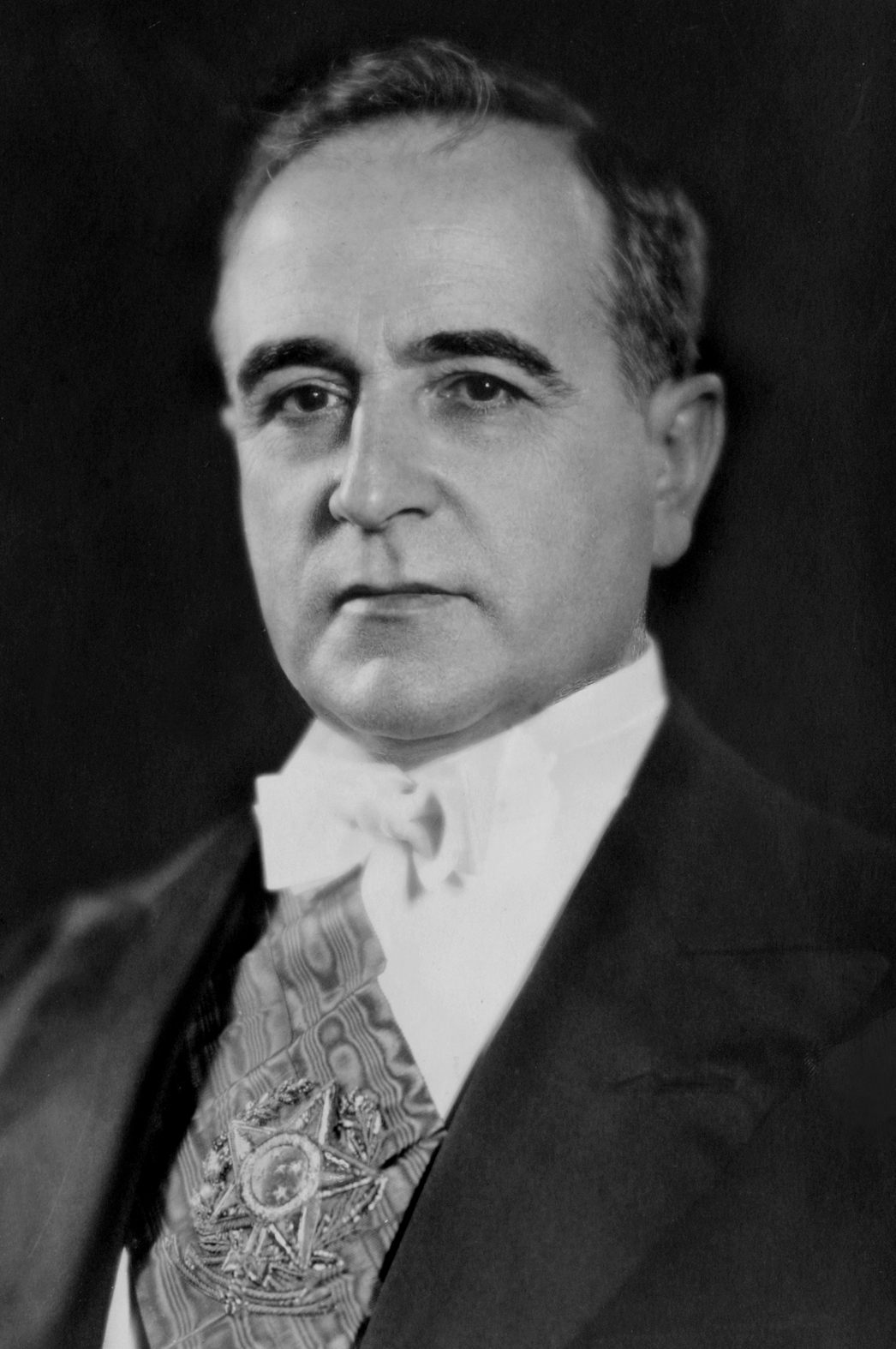
Getúlio Vargas

- Getúlio Vargas was the president of Brazil for two periods, first from 1930 to 1945. Between 1937 and 1945 he ruled as dictator under the Estado Novo regime. Despite Brazil's strong economic ties with Nazi Germany, Vargas sided with the Allies after the sinking of Brazilian merchant ships by German U-boats, and declared war against Nazi Germany and Fascist Italy in August 1942. Vargas gave economic and military support (Brazilian Expeditionary Force) to the Allies.
- João Baptista Mascarenhas de Morais was the commander of the Brazilian Expeditionary Force. He arrived in Italy with the first Brazilian troops in 1944 and commanded the Brazilian forces until the surrender of the Axis forces in Italy. After the end of the war he was given the rank of Field Marshal.
- Euclides Zenóbio da Costa was the Commander of the first contingent of Brazilian troops to arrive at Italy, the 6th infantry RCT.

== British Empire and Commonwealth ==
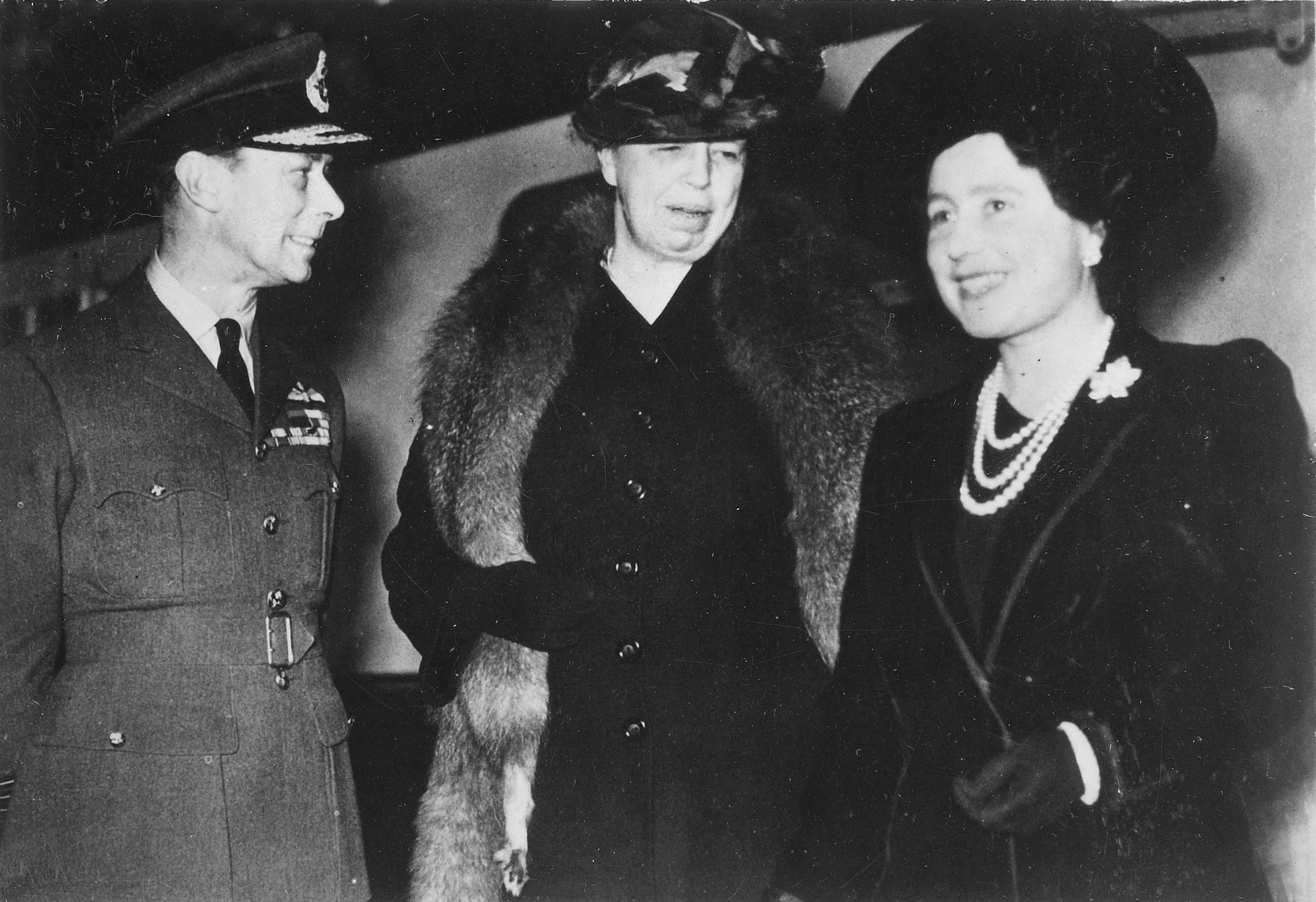
King George VI, and Queen Elizabeth with Eleanor Roosevelt in London.

- King George VI was the reigning monarch of the British Commonwealth during the war, and thus acted as Commander-in-Chief of a number of states within that organisation, including the United Kingdom, Canada, Australia, and New Zealand. The King was, further, a symbol of national and Commonwealth unity during the war, he and his family visiting bomb sites, munitions factories, and with Commonwealth soldiers. Several members of the Royal Family, including the Princess Elizabeth (later Queen Elizabeth II), served in the forces.

=== Australia ===
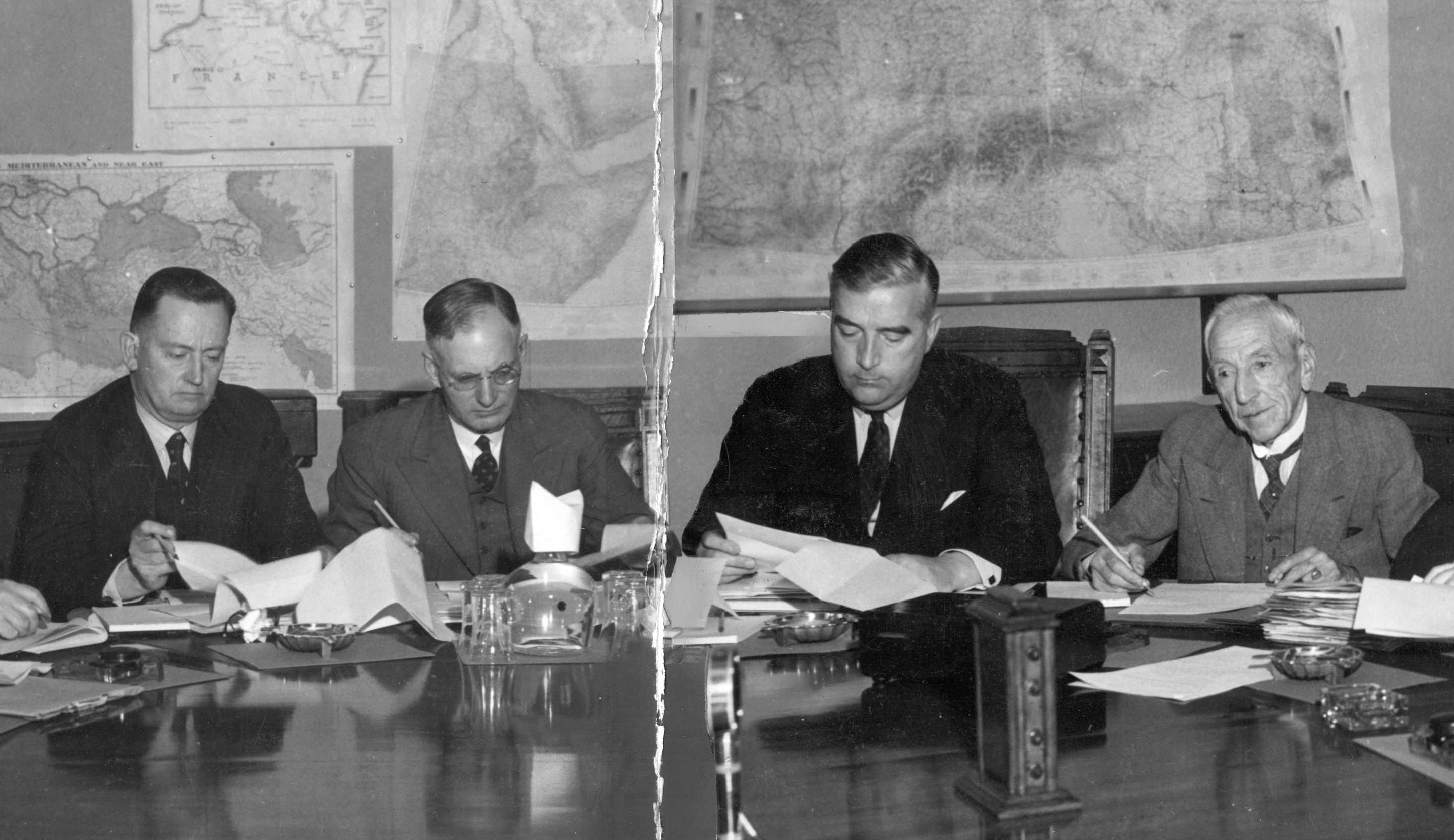
Three of Australia's World War II prime ministers – Forde, Curtin and Menzies – plus World War I prime minister Billy Hughes

- Robert Menzies was the prime minister of Australia from 26 April 1939 until 29 August 1941. He served a second term as prime minister between 1949 and 1966.
- Arthur Fadden replaced Menzies as prime minister but was forced from office when his government collapsed on 7 October 1941. He had previously served as acting prime minister for long periods while Menzies was out of the country.
- John Curtin was prime minister from 7 October 1941 until his death on 5 July 1945. In January 1942, facing Japanese attacks, he wrote in a historic New Year message that Australia looked to the US for its security, rather than the UK. Curtin also formed a close working relationship with General MacArthur and directed the Australian military to follow MacArthur's orders as if they were his own. Curtin had several disagreements over defense policy with British prime minister Winston Churchill.
- Frank Forde was appointed prime minister after Curtin's death, but lost the position on 12 July to a leadership challenge. He had served as acting prime minister during periods when Curtin was out of the country or unwell during 1944 and 1945.
- Ben Chifley replaced Forde and served as prime minister until 1949.
- Sir Thomas Blamey (Field Marshal) was the Commander-in-Chief of the Australian Military Forces and Commander of Allied Land Forces in the South West Pacific Area during the war. Commander of Allied land forces in the South West Pacific, 1942–45. He became Australia's first and only Field Marshal after the war. In 1945 he signed the Japanese surrender document on behalf of Australia.
- Ernest Squires (Lieutenant General) was the 14th Chief of the General Staff from 1939 to 1940.
- John Northcott (Lieutenant General) was the 15th & 18th Chief of the General Staff from 1940 to 1940 and 1942 to 1945.
- Sir Brudenell White (General) was the 9th & 16th Chief of the General Staff from 1920 to 1923 and 1940 to 1940 (Killed during the 1940 Canberra air disaster).
- Vernon Sturdee (Lieutenant General) was the 17th Chief of the General Staff from 1940 to 1942.
- Sir Ragnar Colvin (Admiral) was the 8th First Naval Member, Australian Commonwealth Naval Board from 1937 to 1941.
- Sir Guy Royle (Admiral) was the 9th First Naval Member, Australian Commonwealth Naval Board from 1941 to 1945.
- Sir Louis Hamilton (Admiral) was the 10th First Naval Member, Australian Commonwealth Naval Board from 1941 to 1945.

=== Canada ===
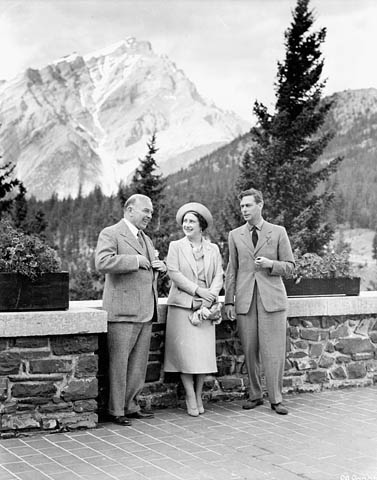
King George VI and Queen Elizabeth with Prime Minister of Canada William Lyon Mackenzie King at the Banff Springs Hotel just prior to the outbreak of war in Europe, 27 May 1939

- William Lyon Mackenzie King was the prime minister of Canada during the war. After helping to secure nearly full legislative autonomy for the Dominions, Canada was free to enter the war on its own accord. Despite initially favouring appeasement of Adolf Hitler, King asked the opinion of the Canadian parliament before advising George VI, as King of Canada, to declare war on Germany after the Invasion of Poland.
- Harry Crerar was a general and the de facto commander of the Canadian military during the war. Crerar led the Canadian military during the Invasion of Normandy. He was described as an able administrator and politically astute.
- Guy Simonds was an army officer who commanded the II Canadian Corps. He served as acting commander of the First Canadian Army, leading the Allied forces to victory in the Battle of the Scheldt. After the war he was appointed Chief of the General Staff. He was the youngest officer in the Canadian army to be promoted to the rank of General.
- E. L. M. Burns and Charles Foulkes successively commanded the I Canadian Corps during the war on the Western Front.
- Andrew McNaughton was the original commanding officer of the Canadian Expeditionary Forces at the beginning of the war, but was recalled to Canada to serve as Minister of National Defence. He was often attributed responsibility for the Dieppe Raid and he was one of the inventors of radar.

=== New Zealand ===
- Michael Joseph Savage was Prime Minister of New Zealand from 6 December 1935 until his death on 27 March 1940. His government joined Britain in declaring war against Germany in 1939.
- Peter Fraser became prime minister (27 March 1940 until 13 December 1949) after the death of Michael Savage. He led the country during the Second World War when he mobilised New Zealand supplies and volunteers to support Britain while boosting the economy and maintaining home front morale. He formed a war cabinet which included several erstwhile political opponents.
- Bernard Freyberg, 1st Baron Freyberg (Lieutenant General), a veteran of the First World War where he won the Victoria Cross and three Distinguished Service Orders, he led the New Zealand Expeditionary Force in the Battle of Crete, the North African Campaign and the Italian Campaign.

=== British Raj India ===
- The Marquess of Linlithgow was the Viceroy of India from 1936 until 1943. During the war he made an appeal for unity among the people of India.
- Muhammad Ali Jinnah, later Founder of Pakistan, was a major political Muslim leader of the All India Muslim League. When the world war broke out he asked all Indians to join the British Army against Nazi Germany.
- Archibald Wavell, 1st Earl Wavell at the start of the war was in charge of the Middle East Command. The Italian forces in North Africa greatly outnumbered the Allies. Wavell, however, was able not only to repel Italian attacks, but to defeat them and occupy their colonies. Wavell was replaced by Claude Auchinleck in 1941 and became Commander-in-Chief, India, heading the British Indian Army. During early 1942, he led the short-lived American-British-Dutch-Australian Command in South East Asia and the Pacific, before resuming his previous position. In 1943 Wavell succeeded Linlithgow as Viceroy of India.
- Claude Auchinleck nicknamed "The Auk" was appointed Commander-in-Chief, India in January 1941 after commanding the Allied forces during the fall of Norway. He had previously in 1938, when a Major-General, chaired a committee the recommendations of which formed the basis of the 1939 Chatfield Report on the modernisation, re-equipment and expansion of the British Indian Army (which by the end of the war had grown to 2,250,000 men from 183,000 in 1939). In 1941 he replaced Archibald Wavell as Commander-in-Chief Middle East Command but returned as C-in-C India in 1943 when Wavell became Viceroy.
- Vinayak Damodar Savarkar, leader of Hindu Mahasabha, recruited over 100,000 Hindus and Sikhs for helping the British in the world war.

=== Union of South Africa ===
- Jan Smuts was the prime minister of the Union of South Africa from 1939 till 1948. He had served in the Imperial War Cabinet in the First World War and did so again as the most senior South African in favor of war and became South Africa's first Field Marshal in 1941. After the war he represented South Africa at the drafting of the United Nations Charter.
- George Brink was a lieutenant-general in the South African military who commanded the 1st Infantry Division during the war. Brink successfully led the 1st Infantry Division during the East African Campaign. After the war he was responsible for the demobilization.
- Isaac Pierre de Villiers was a major-general in the South African military who commanded the 2nd Infantry Division. Prior to the war, de Villiers served as a lieutenant in the South African Police and so the 2nd Infantry Division was responsible for internal security operations at the beginning of the war.

=== United Kingdom of Great Britain and Northern Ireland ===
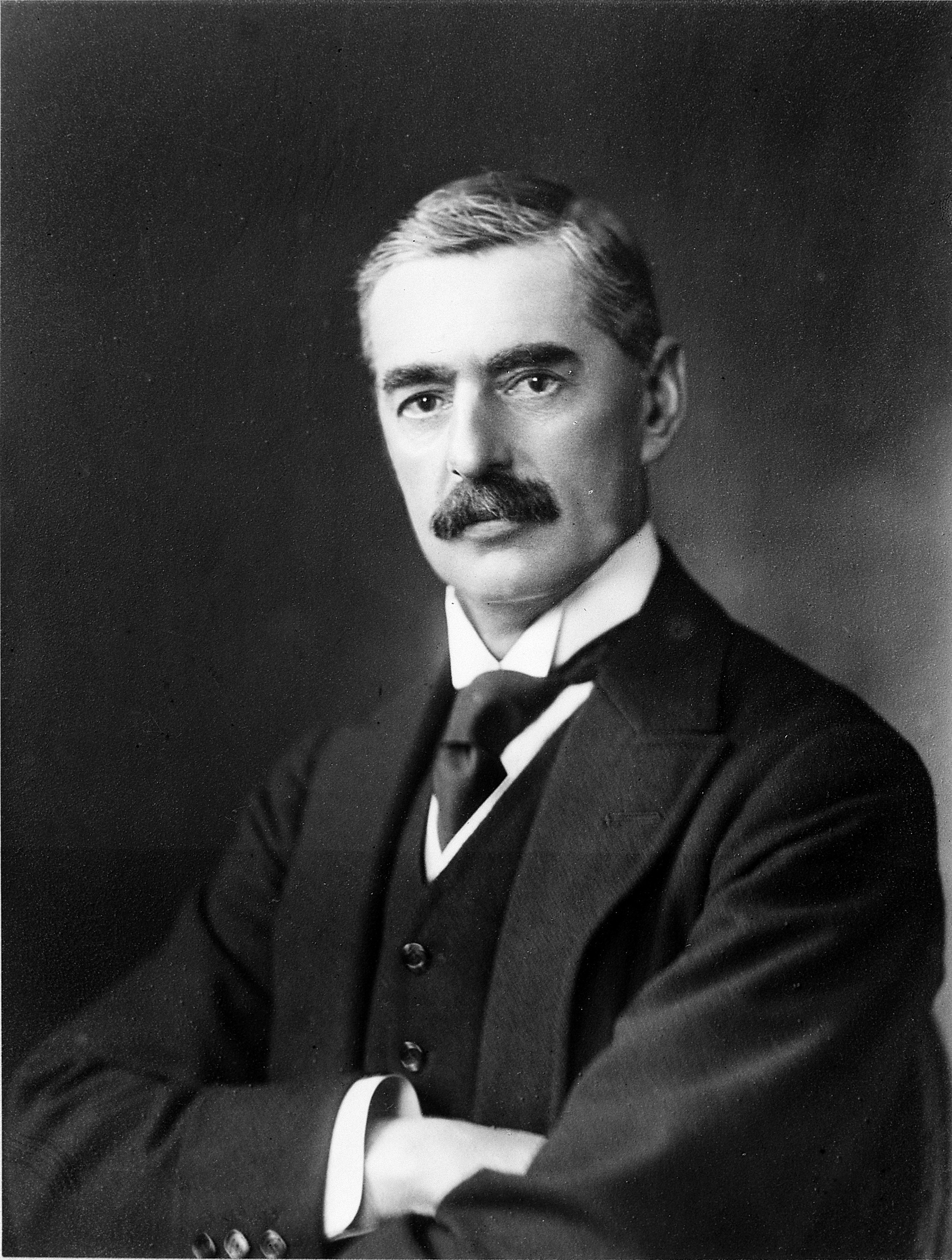
Neville Chamberlain

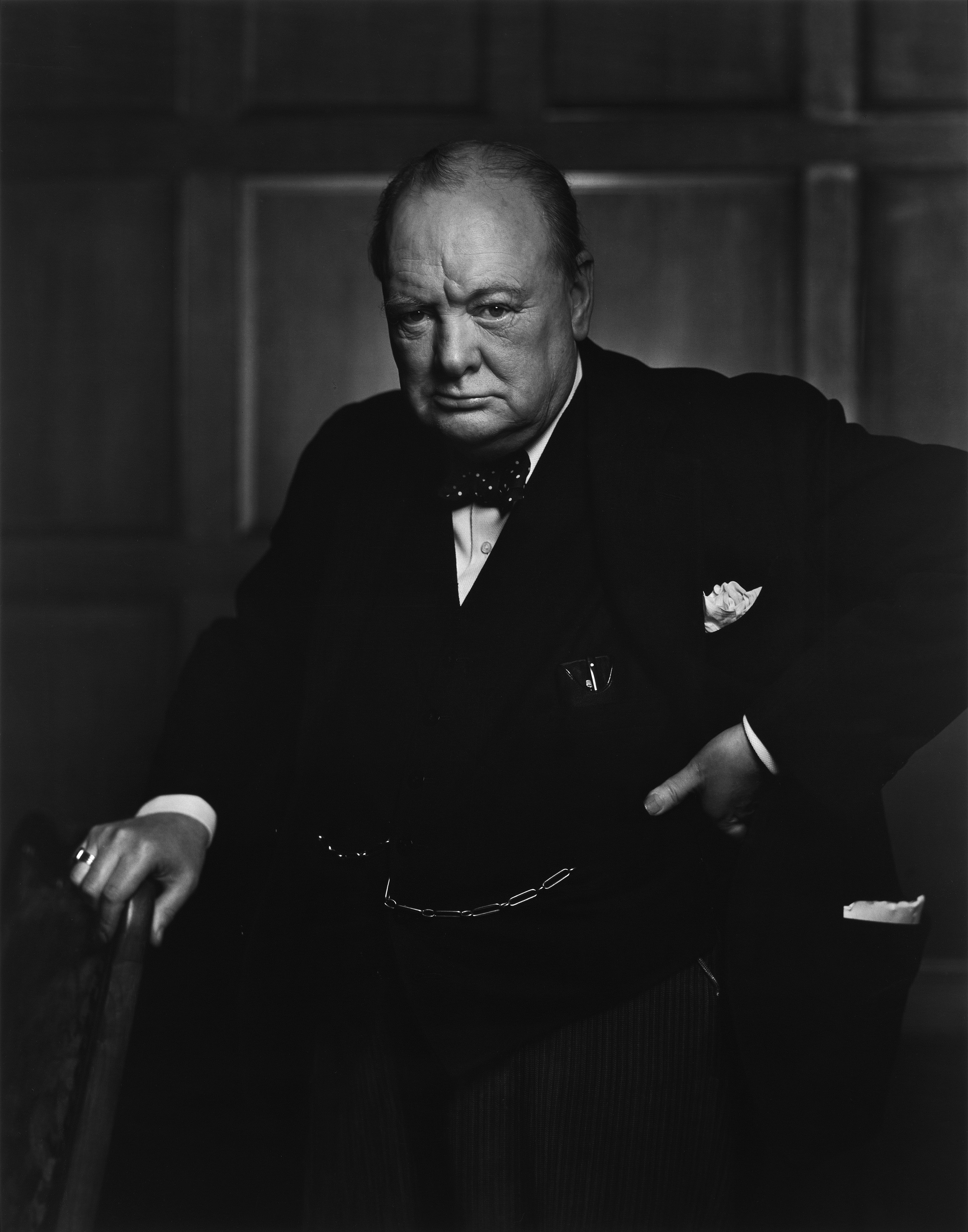
Winston Churchill

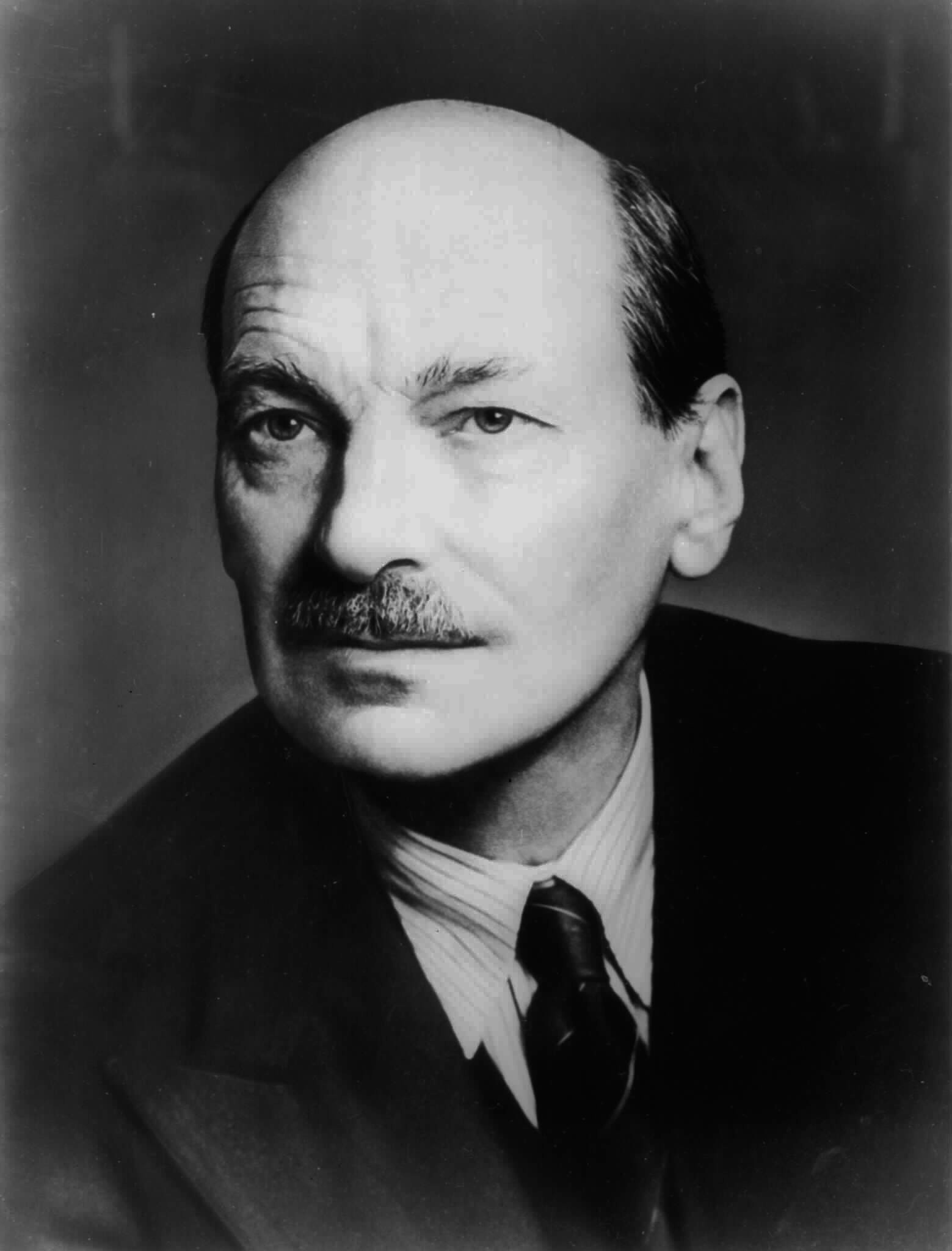
Clement Attlee

- Neville Chamberlain, who had formerly led a policy of appeasement towards Nazi Germany, was prime minister during the first stages of the war, taking office in 1937 and resigning on 10 May 1940 after the failed Norwegian campaign. Chamberlain, who remained Conservative Party leader, then became Lord President of the Council. He died of cancer on 9 November 1940, half a year after resigning.
- Winston Churchill was Prime Minister of the United Kingdom during most of the war, from 1940 to 1945. An early opponent of Hitler, he opposed appeasement of Germany. He was First Lord of the Admiralty at the outbreak of war, then came into power at the start of the Nazi invasion of France. During the Battle of Britain, Churchill's speeches boosted the British morale during the darkest moments.
- Clement Attlee was the Labour Party leader during the war, and was generally responsible for domestic politics throughout the war as a member of Churchill's War Cabinet. He served as deputy prime minister under Churchill. After the end of the war in Europe, he was appointed Prime Minister of the United Kingdom following his party's victory in the 1945 general elections and served from 1945 to 1951. He attended the second half of the Potsdam Conference and announced the Defeat of Japan.
- Dudley Pound was First Sea Lord and as such the professional head of the Royal Navy from June 1939 to September 1943, shortly before his death. He chaired the Chiefs of Staff Committee, which was responsible to Winston Churchill for the British military's conduct of the war, until March 1942.
- Alan Brooke was Chief of the Imperial General Staff (head of Britain's army) from December 1941 and from March 1942 also chaired the British Chiefs of Staff Committee. He held the posts until the war's end and was as such Churchill's foremost military advisor. He was promoted Field Marshal in January 1944.
- Andrew Cunningham succeeded Dudley Pound as First Sea Lord and naval member of the British Chiefs of Staff Committee in 1943. He remained in the post for the rest of the war.
- James Somerville was commander-in-chief of the Eastern Fleet who was defeated by the Japanese in the Indian Ocean raid. Prior to this he commanded the Atlantic-Mediterranean squadron Force H based at Gibraltar and led them at the Battle of Cape Spartivento and also during the hunt for the Bismarck.
- Charles Portal in October 1940 succeeded Cyril Newall as Chief of the Air Staff, the head of the Royal Air Force, and member of the British Chiefs of Staff Committee. He continued in this role for the rest of the war. He was promoted Marshal of the Royal Air Force in June 1944.
- Harold Alexander, 1st Earl Alexander of Tunis at the end of the War was a Field Marshal and Commander-in-Chief of AFHQ responsible for the direction of Allied troops in the Mediterranean theatre. Previously he had commanded 15th Army Group which conducted the Allied invasion of Sicily and the Italian Campaign. Prior to this he commanded 18th Army Group which directed the Allied forces during the culmination of the Tunisia Campaign leading to the surrender of Axis forces in North Africa. Before that was Commander-in Chief British Middle East Command, overseeing Montgomery's Eighth Army successful campaign to defeat the Axis forces in the Western Desert Campaign.
- Viscount Gort relinquished the role of Chief of the Imperial General Staff on the outbreak of war to command the British Expeditionary Force in France from 1939 to 1940. He later served in a variety of less prominent posts, including Governor of Gibraltar and of Malta.
- Bernard Montgomery, 1st Viscount Montgomery of Alamein was a General (later Field Marshal) who led the Allied forces in North Africa. Under his command the Allies were able to defeat the Afrika Korps and their Italian allies. He later commanded the 21st Army Group and all Allied ground forces during Operation Overlord. He was also the primary mind behind the failed Operation Market Garden. He accepted the surrender of German forces on the 4 May 1945.
- Hugh Dowding, 1st Baron Dowding was an Air Chief Marshal who commanded RAF Fighter Command during the Battle of Britain. He ended the sacrifice of aircraft and pilots in the attempt to aid troops during the Battle of France, which was weakening the home defence. He developed the "Dowding System" – an integrated air defence system of radar, raid plotting and radio control of aircraft. He introduced modern aircraft into service such as the Supermarine Spitfire and Hawker Hurricane. During the battle he led resources behind the scenes and maintained a significant fighter reserve, while leaving his subordinate commanders' hands free to run the battle.
- Keith Park was an Air Chief Marshal who commanded 11 Group RAF, the fighter formation tasked with the defence of London during the Battle of Britain. Later he was in charge of the defence of Malta.
- Arthur Harris was an Air Chief Marshal commonly known as "Bomber" Harris by the press. He was Air Officer Commanding-in-Chief of RAF Bomber Command and later a Marshal of the Royal Air Force during the latter half of World War II.
- Lord Louis Mountbatten, Admiral of the Fleet, was Supreme Commander of Allied Forces in South East Asia, 1943–1945.
- William Slim, 1st Viscount Slim was a General who led the British Fourteenth Army (often referred to as the "Forgotten Army") during the Burma Campaign from 1942 to 1945.

==== Malayan Union British Malaya ====
- Shenton Thomas was the Governor of Straits Settlements and the British High Commissioner in Malaya from 1934 until 1942. After the fall of Singapore he was taken as a POW and imprisoned in Cell 24 of Changi Prison.
- Arthur Percival was the General Officer Commanding Malaya at the start of the Pacific War. After the fall of Singapore he was taken as a prisoner-of-war. Percival's surrender to the invading Japanese forces was the largest capitulation in British military history.

==== Newfoundland ====
- Sir Humphrey Walwyn was governor of Newfoundland and chairman of the Commission of Government from 1936 to 1946. A former Royal Navy Admiral, during World War II he was active in encouraging Newfoundlanders to join the war effort.

==== British Mandate for Palestine ====
- Harold MacMichael was a British colonial administrator who was appointed as the High Commissioner of the British Mandate of Palestine from 1937 until 1944 year. During this era he attempted to suppress Zionist and Arab nationalists but had to change this policy during the war.
- Henry Maitland Wilson, 1st Baron Wilson was a Field Marshal and commander of the Ninth Army in the British Mandate of Palestine. During the Syria-Lebanon campaign he led the Allied Forces in Syria and Lebanon against Vichy France. For his actions he was promoted to full General.

==== Southern Rhodesia ====
- Sir Godfrey Huggins was prime minister of the self-governing colony of Southern Rhodesia (which had autonomy in many respects, but not in foreign affairs) from 1933 to 1953. An English-born physician, he was a veteran of World War I. He was knighted in 1941.

== Republic of China ==
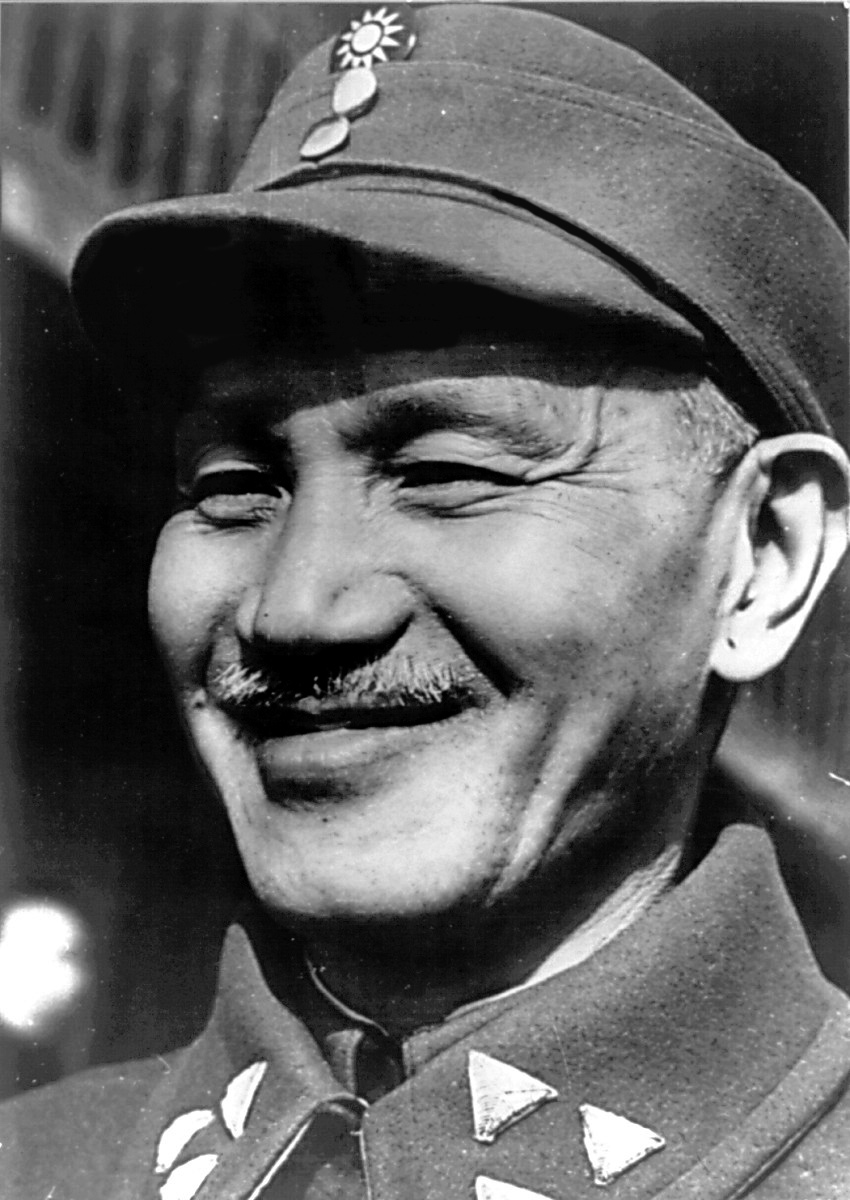
Generalissimo Chiang Kai-shek.

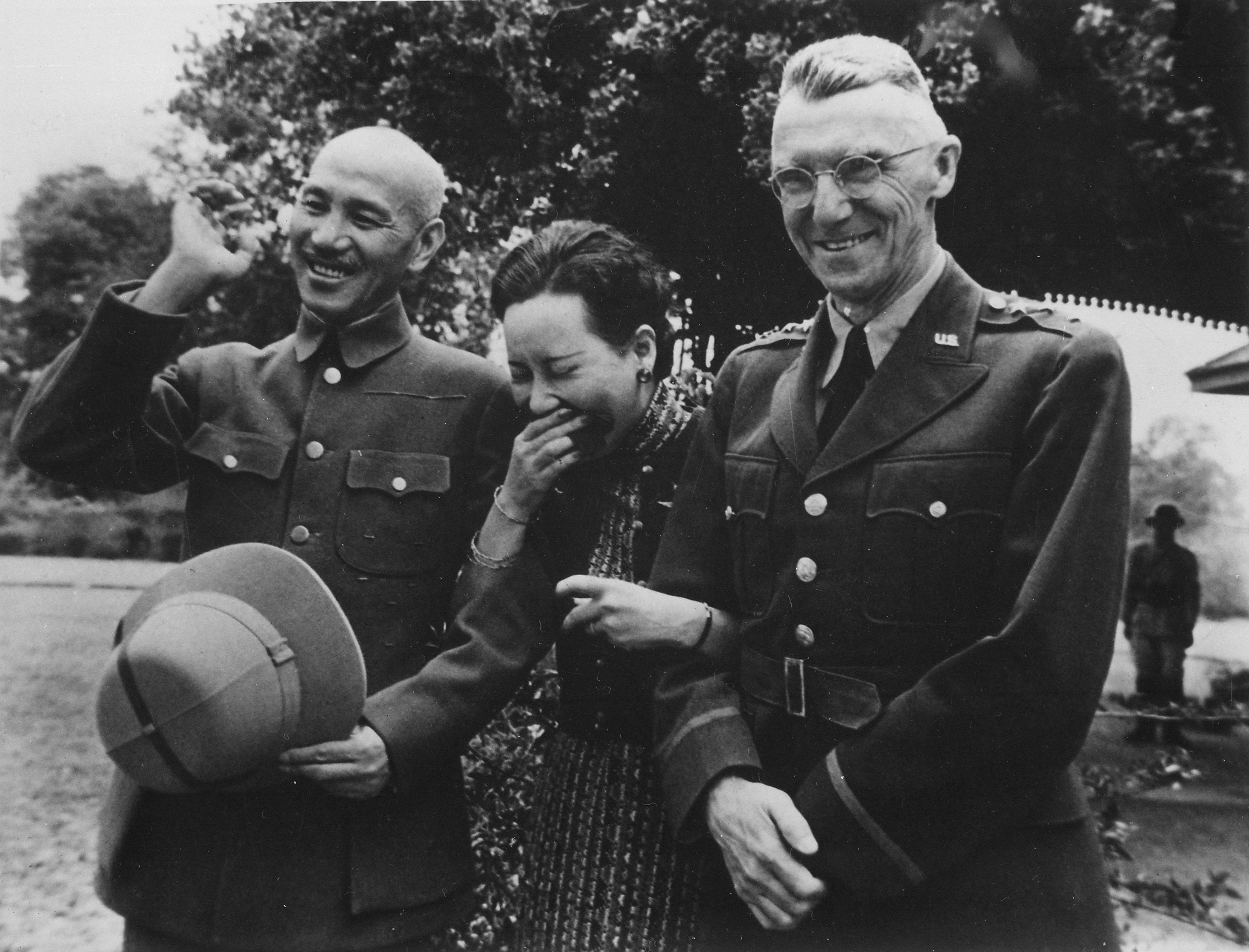
Generalissimo and Madame Chiang Kai-shek and Lieutenant General Joseph W. Stilwell in Burma in 1942.

- Chiang Kai-shek was the Generalissimo of the National Revolutionary Army and the chairman of the National Military Council, the highest political organ of the nation at the time. He was also the Director-General of the Chinese Nationalist Party (Kuomintang) and, from 1943, Chairman of the National Government. He took the nation into the full-scale war with Japan after the Marco Polo Bridge Incident on 7 July 1937. After China joined the Allies in 1942, he was the Supreme Commander of the China Theatre, which also included Burma.
- Soong Mei-ling was First Lady of the Republic of China and the wife of Generalissimo Chiang Kai-shek. During the Second Sino-Japanese War she rallied her people against the Japanese invasion. Educated in the United States and speaking in eloquent English, she played an instrumental role in the formation of the Sino-American co-operation and conducted a speaking tour in the United States to gain international support.
- Lin Sen, as Chairman (or President) of the National Government, was China's titular head of state but had no real power. Lin died in 1943, after which Chiang Kai-Shek assumed the role himself.
- He Yingqin was the Chief of the General Staff of the National Military Council. He was also the Commander of the Fourth Military Region and led in the victorious Battle of West Hunan in 1945. He became the representative of both the Chinese Government and the Southeast Asia Allied Forces at the September 9th ceremony in Nanjing to accept the statement of surrender from Japan in 1945.
- Chen Cheng was a General of the National Revolutionary Army and political figure in the National Military Council. He was one of Chiang's most trusted allies. He led in the Battle of Wuhan and he went on to command during the Battle of Changsha, Battle of Yichang and Battle of West Hubei in the latter years. In 1943, he was appointed the commander of the Chinese Expeditionary Force in Burma campaign. After the war, he became the Chief of the General Staff.
- Bai Chongxi was a close ally of Guangxi warlord Li Zongren and the Deputy Chief of the General Staff of the National Military Council. He was a key strategist who convinced Chiang to adopt a "Total War" strategy. He was also involved in many key campaigns including the first major victory at the Battle of Tai'erzhuang and also the Battle of Wuhan in 1938. He also commanded another victorious First Battle of Changsha in 1939. Bai also directed the Battle of South Guangxi and Battle of Kunlun Pass to retake South Guangxi in the later stage.
- Li Zongren was a former Guangxi warlord who fought in alliance with Chiang Kai-shek in the war against Japan. He was the commander of the Battle of Xuzhou and famously won the Battle of Tai'erzhuang, the first major Chinese victory in the war, and commanded one of the largest and relatively better equipped regional armies that comprised the bulk of the Chinese armed forces during the war.
- Yan Xishan was a former Shanxi warlord who fought in alliance with Chiang Kai-shek. During the early stage of the Japanese invasion, he invited Communist military forces to enter Shanxi to fight with the Japanese and defended Taiyuan in 1937. He was a member of the National Military Council and the Commander of the Second Military Region.
- Wei Lihuang was a General of the National Revolutionary Army and the Commander of the Chinese Expeditionary Force in 1943 and 1944 which was responsible for the major ground operations in support of U.S. General Joseph W. Stilwell's offensive in Northern Burma and Western Yunnan and the construction of Ledo Road.
- Xue Yue was a General of the National Revolutionary Army and the Commander of the Ninth Military Region. He was known for defending Changsha from Japanese offensives for three times in 1939, 1941 and 1942.
- Claire Lee Chennault was the commander of the Flying Tigers. Originally a military advisor to Chiang Kai-shek, Chennault was asked to establish American squadrons to aid the Republic of China. Chennault spent the winter of 1940–1941 in Washington, helping to negotiate the establishment of the American Volunteer Group. The AVG began their service with the Chinese Air Force in 1941 until it was disbanded in 1942.
- Mao Zedong was the Chairman of the Chinese Communist Party who formed the "United Front" with the Nationalist Government against Japanese aggression. The Red Army was reorganized into the New Fourth Army and the Eighth Route Army, which were placed under the nominal command of the National Revolutionary Army despite the Communist Party remained full control of the armies. The cooperation between the Nationalists and the Communists began to break down by 1939 as the two forces clashed and effectively ended after the New Fourth Army Incident in 1941.
- Zhu De was commander-in-chief of the Eighth Route Army and a top military leader within the Chinese Communist Party.
- Peng Dehuai commanded the Hundred Regiments Offensive, the largest Communist offensive during the war.

== Republic of Cuba ==
- Fulgencio Batista y Zaldívar was elected President of Cuba in 1940 and had effectively run the country since the 1933 Sergeants' Revolt as army chief of staff. Cuba declared war on Germany and Italy on December 11, 1941. Batista committed Cuba's navy to fight in the Battle of the Caribbean.
- Ramón Grau San Martín was elected to the presidency at the end of Batista's term in 1944.
- José Águila Ruíz served as chief of the Cuban Navy for the later part of the war years.

== Free Czechoslovak Republic ==
- Edvard Beneš was President of Czechoslovakia and later head of the Czechoslovak Government-in-Exile.
- Klement Gottwald was leader of the Czechoslovak communist resistance.
- Ludvík Svoboda led Czechoslovak military units on Eastern front against Germany.
- Karel Klapálek led Czechoslovak units in the defense of Tobruk and on eastern front (since April 1945).
- Alois Liška led Czechoslovak military units on Western front in 1944–1945.
- Karel Janoušek led the Czechoslovak air force in Great Britain.
- Karel Kutlvašr was the military leader of the Prague uprising.

== Kingdom of Denmark ==
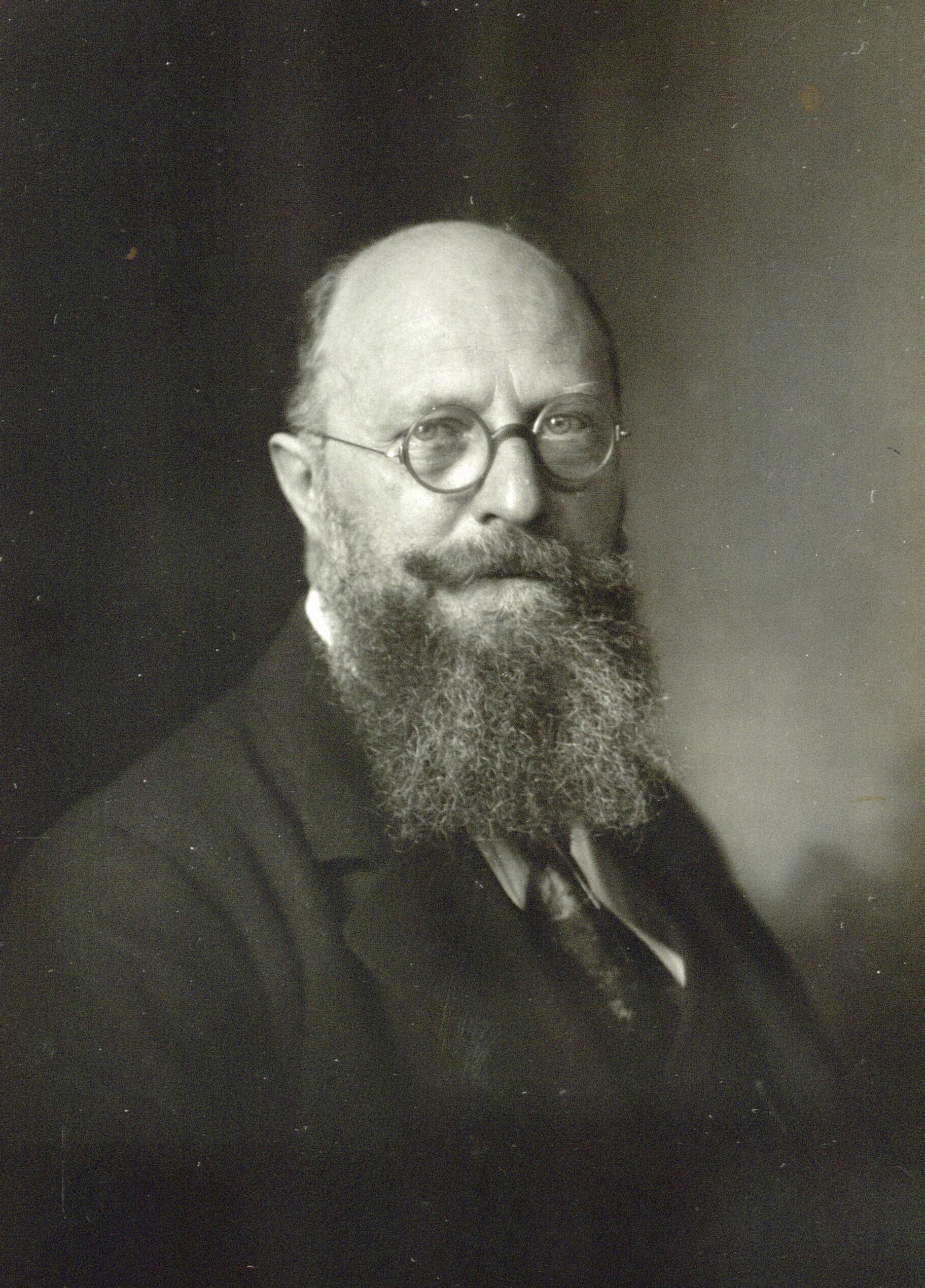
Thorvald Stauning, Prime minister of Denmark 1924–1942.

- Christian X of Denmark Danish king from 1912 to 1947.
- Thorvald Stauning Prime minister of Denmark from 1929 to his death in 1942.
- Vilhelm Buhl Prime minister of Denmark in 1942. Adolf Hitler personally ordered him removed in 1942.
- Erik Scavenius Prime minister of Denmark from 1942 to 1943. Dissolved the Danish government in 1943, and the government was then replaced by total German military rule in Denmark.
- William Wain Prior Commander-in-chief of the Royal Danish Army before 1941.
- Ebbe Gørtz Commander-in-chief of the Royal Danish Army after 1941.
- Hjalmar Rechnitzer Commander-in-chief of the Royal Danish Navy before 1940.
- A. H. Vedel Commander-in-chief of the Royal Danish Navy after 1941.

== Kingdom of Egypt ==
- Farouk of Egypt was the King of Egypt.
- Ahmad Mahir Pasha was the prime minister of Egypt from 10 October 1944 to 24 February 1945.

== Ethiopian Empire ==
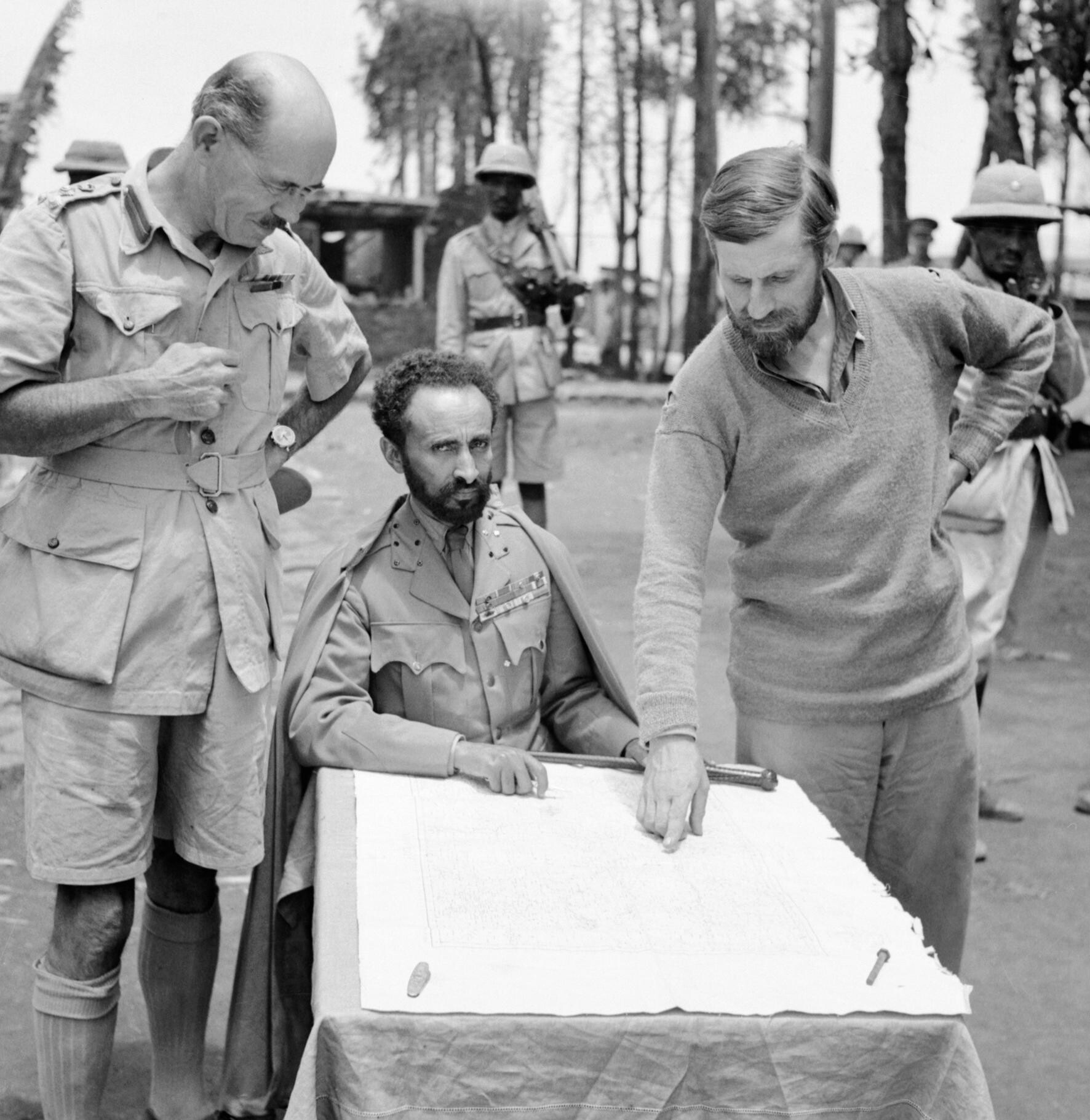
Haile Selassie with Orde Wingate (right)

- Haile Selassie was the Emperor of Ethiopia from 1930 until 1974. Prior to the war, Italy invaded Ethiopia.
- Makonnen Endelkachew was Prime Minister of Ethiopia.
- Imru Haile Selassie
- Kassa Haile Darge
- Orde Wingate was a British Army Officer and commander of the Gideon Force during the East African Campaign. Under Wingate command, the Gideon Force was successful in aiding the British in defeating Fascist Italian forces and liberating Ethiopia.

== French Republic ==
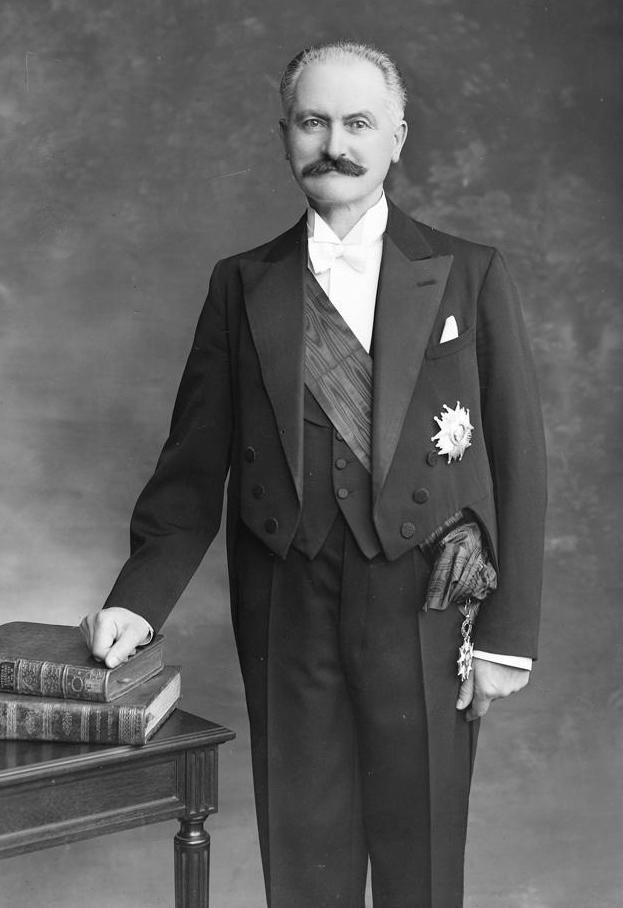
Albert Lebrun

- Albert Lebrun was the last President of the Third Republic. In 1940, he was forced to accept the German terms of surrender of France and was replaced by Philippe Pétain as head the French state (see Vichy France). In 1944, Lebrun acknowledged de Gaulle's leadership of the restored French, provisional, government. In 1945, since he had not resigned from his presidential office, and that Pétain was not president, Lebrun thought he could be able to return to power after the liberation.
- Édouard Daladier was prime minister from 1938 to 1940. He led his country during the opening stages of the war. Daladier resigned on 9 May 1940, the day before the German invasion of France, because of his failure to aid Finland's defence in the Winter War.
- Paul Reynaud succeeded Daladier as prime minister in 1940 and led France during the Battle of France. After Germany had occupied large parts of France, Reynaud was advised by his newly appointed Minister of State Philippe Pétain to come to separate peace with Germany. Reynaud refused to do so, and resigned.
- Philippe Pétain was prime minister in 1940.
- Maurice Gamelin commanded the French military during the critical days of May 1940, before being removed from his position after failing to defend France from the Germans.
- Maxime Weygand replaced Gamelin as commander of the French army in May 1940. He eventually favoured an armistice with Germany.

=== Free French Forces (and later Fighting France and Provisional government of the French Republic) ===
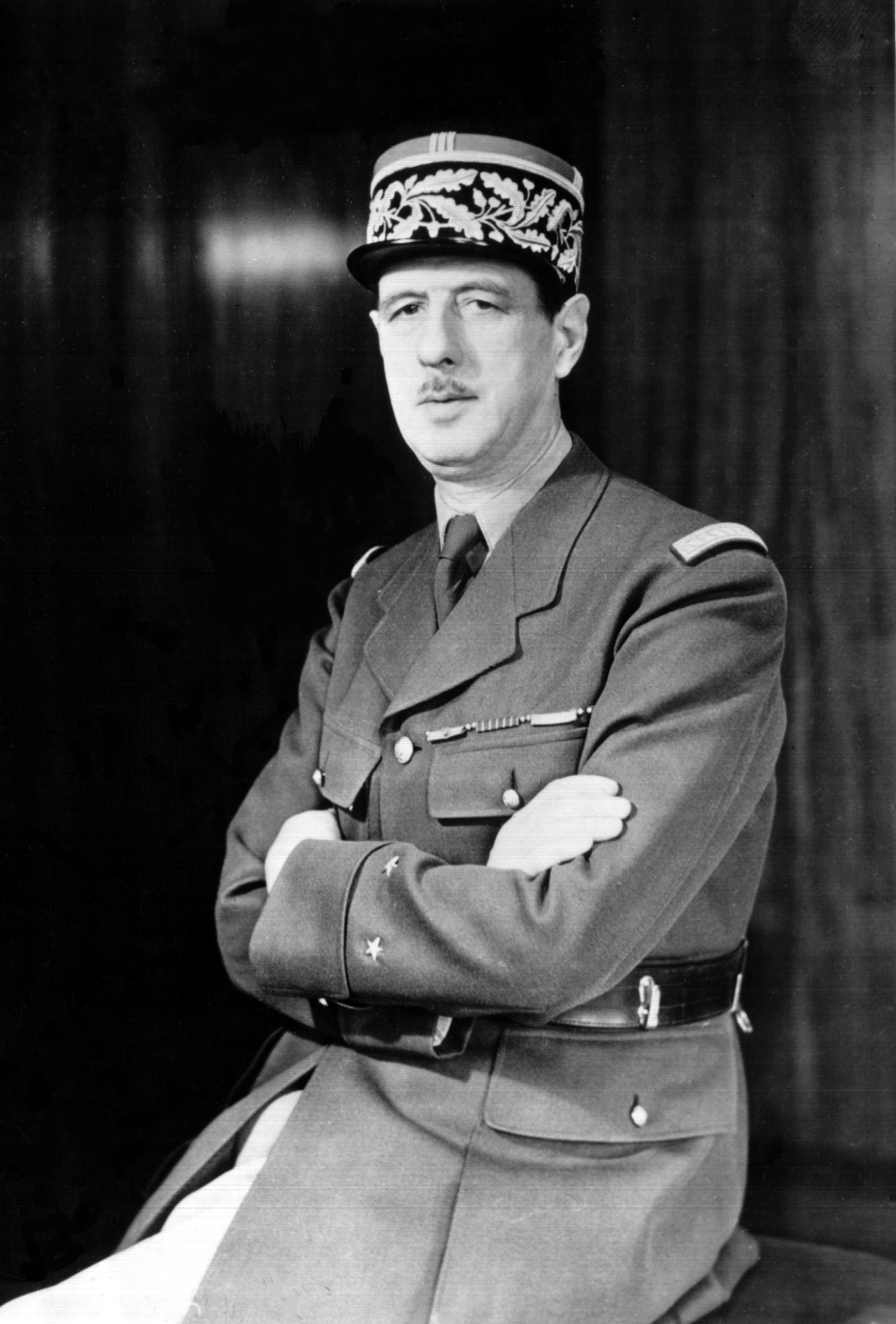
Charles de Gaulle

- Charles de Gaulle was the leader of the Free French and as such head of the French government-in-exile following the Fall of France. A vehement opponent of collaboration, he eventually took nominal command of the French resistance and headed the French Army of Liberation from its foundation to the war's end.
- Henri Giraud was de Gaulle's rival and the Western Allies' favourite. He escaped from Germany where he was a prisoner of war and co-founded the Free French movement with de Gaulle, though soon found himself relegated to second in command of the Free French Forces after the Casablanca Conference of 1943. He was the chief of staff of the French Army of Liberation from 1943 to July 1944.
- Philippe Leclerc de Hauteclocque was a leader of the Free French forces, and commanded forces both in Africa and in France. After the war ended, he commanded the French Far East Expeditionary Corps in the First Indochina War. He signed the armistice with Japan on behalf of France on September 2, 1945.
- Alphonse Juin became chief of staff of the French Army in July 1944 after being the commander of the French Expeditionary Corps (130,000 men) in Italy.
- Marie-Pierre Kœnig became commander in chief of the French Forces of the Interior which effectively helped the Allies in the invasion of France.
- Félix Éboué, governor of French Chad at the start of the war, was instrumental in building support for Free France in French Equatorial Africa; he served as acting Governor-General of French Equatorial Africa until 1944.
- Jean de Lattre de Tassigny was the commander of the First French Army which invaded southern France with 260,000 men. His army numbered more than 320,000 men when he entered in Germany with the integration of the FFI.
- Georges Catroux was the main French military leader in Syria and Lebanon before entering De Gaulle's government.
- André Lemonnier was a French Admiral who served as the French Navy chief of staff in 1943 and led the French Navy's participation in Operation Dragoon (34 warships including one battleship and eight cruisers).

== Kingdom of Greece (1940–1945) ==
- George II of Greece was King of Greece from 1922 to 1924 and from 1935 until his death in 1947. King George was pro-British, and this stance greatly influenced the country's policy. When Germany invaded Greece, the King and the government fled the Greek mainland for Crete but after the Battle of Crete he was evacuated to Egypt and went to Great Britain. During the war he remained the internationally recognized head of state, backed by the exiled government and Greek armed forces serving in the Middle East.
- Ioannis Metaxas was the dictator and from 1936 until his death in 1941. Despite his quasi-fascist tendencies and strong economic ties with Nazi Germany, he pursued a policy of pro-British neutrality. On 28 October 1940 he rejected an Italian ultimatum, and ordered the Greek Army to repel the Italian invasion of the country.
- Emmanouil Tsouderos was the last prime minister of Greece during the German invasion. He also was the first and longest-serving prime minister of the Greek government-in-exile, which represented the Free Greek Forces, also connected with the Greek Resistance, during the Axis occupation of Greece.
- Georgios Papandreou was the last prime minister of the Greek government-in-exile. He also served as the first Prime Minister of Greece, after its liberation from the Axis powers, during the reestablishment of the exiled free government.
- Alexandros Papagos was a Greek general who led the Greek Army in the Greco-Italian War and the Battle of Greece. As head of the Army from 1935, he played an active role in the attempts at its reorganization and modernization. When war was declared he was named Commander-in-Chief and led Greek forces against Italy along the Albanian border and later against the invading German army. When the Greek government fled to Crete, Papagos remained behind and with other generals. During the years of occupation he established a resistance organization, but he was arrested by the occupation authorities and sent to concentration camps in Germany. In 1945, after the Allied Victory, he was liberated, repatriated and rejoined the Army.
- Georgios Siantos was the main leader of the National Liberation Front (EAM), the country's largest resistance organization.
- Napoleon Zervas was the leader of the National Republican Greek League (EDES), the country's second largest resistance organization.
- Aris Velouchiotis was the creator and chief leader of the Greek People's Liberation Army (ELAS), the country's largest guerrilla force, aligned to the leftist National Liberation Front.
- Archbishop Damaskinos served as Regent of Greece between the end of the German occupation in 1944 and the return of King George II to Greece in 1946.

== Imperial State of Iran (after Anglo-Soviet Invasion) ==
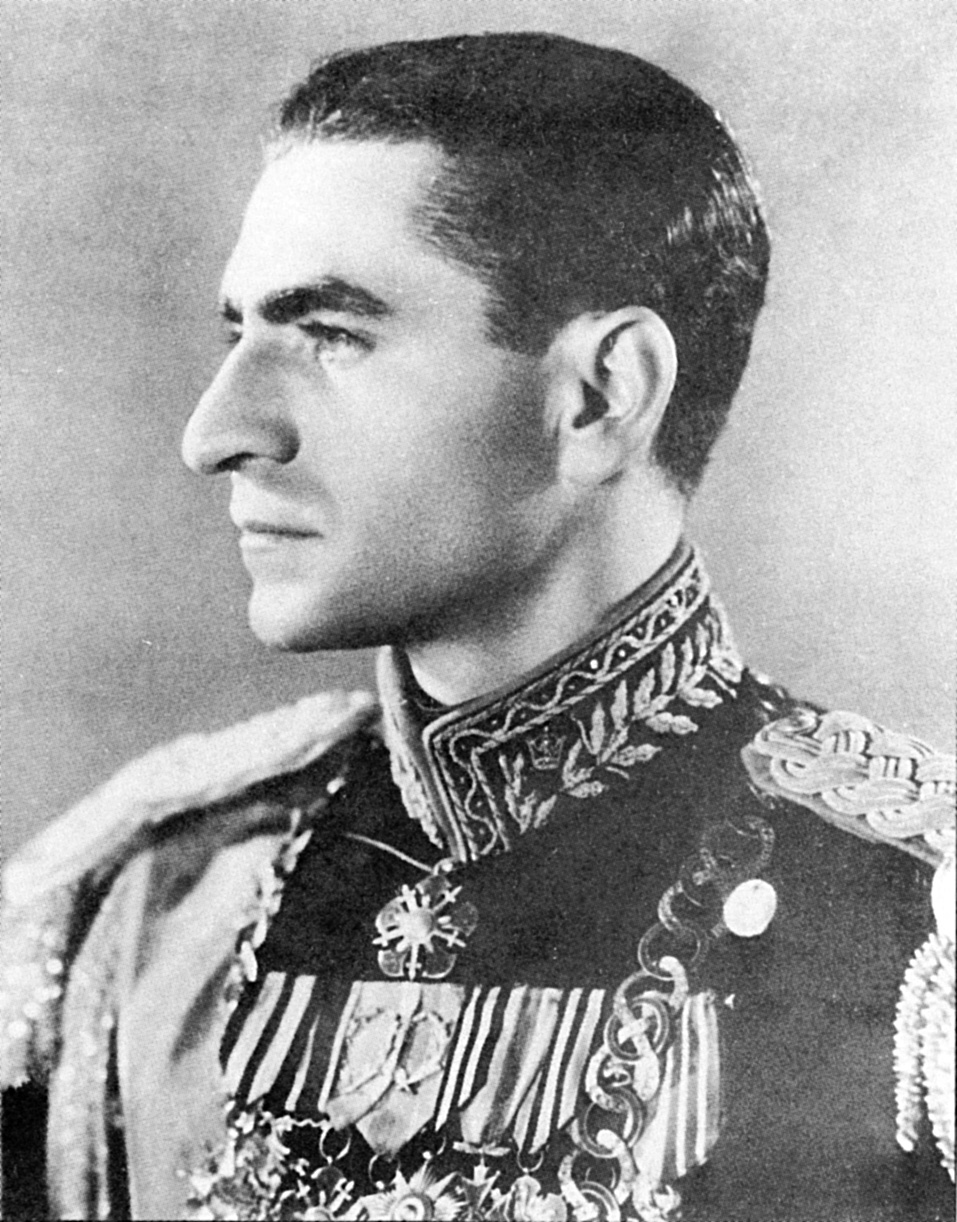
Mohammad Reza Shah

- Mohammad Reza Pahlavi was the Shah (King) of Iran which came to power after the abdication of his father, Reza Pahlavi. Reza Shah was forced to abdicated power to his son after Anglo-Soviet invasion of Iran.
- Mohammad-Ali Foroughi was the prime minister of Iran during the abdication of Reza Shah. He remained in office and assisted to new Shah. He retired from politics on 9 March 1942.
- Ali Soheili was the Foreign Minister of Iran and then Prime Minister of Iran from 9 March to 9 August 1942 and again from 15 February 1943 until his resignation on 6 April 1944.
- Ahmad Qavam was the prime minister of Iran from 9 August 1942 from 15 February 1943. He resolved the Soviet inspired rebellion of the occupied Azerbaijan province. He ordered the Iranian delegation to the UN to negotiate issues pending before the Security Council directly with the Soviet delegation. He then flew to Moscow to discuss the issues personally with Stalin.
- Ali Razmara was Chief commander of Imperial Army of Iran.

== Provisional Government of the Republic of Korea ==
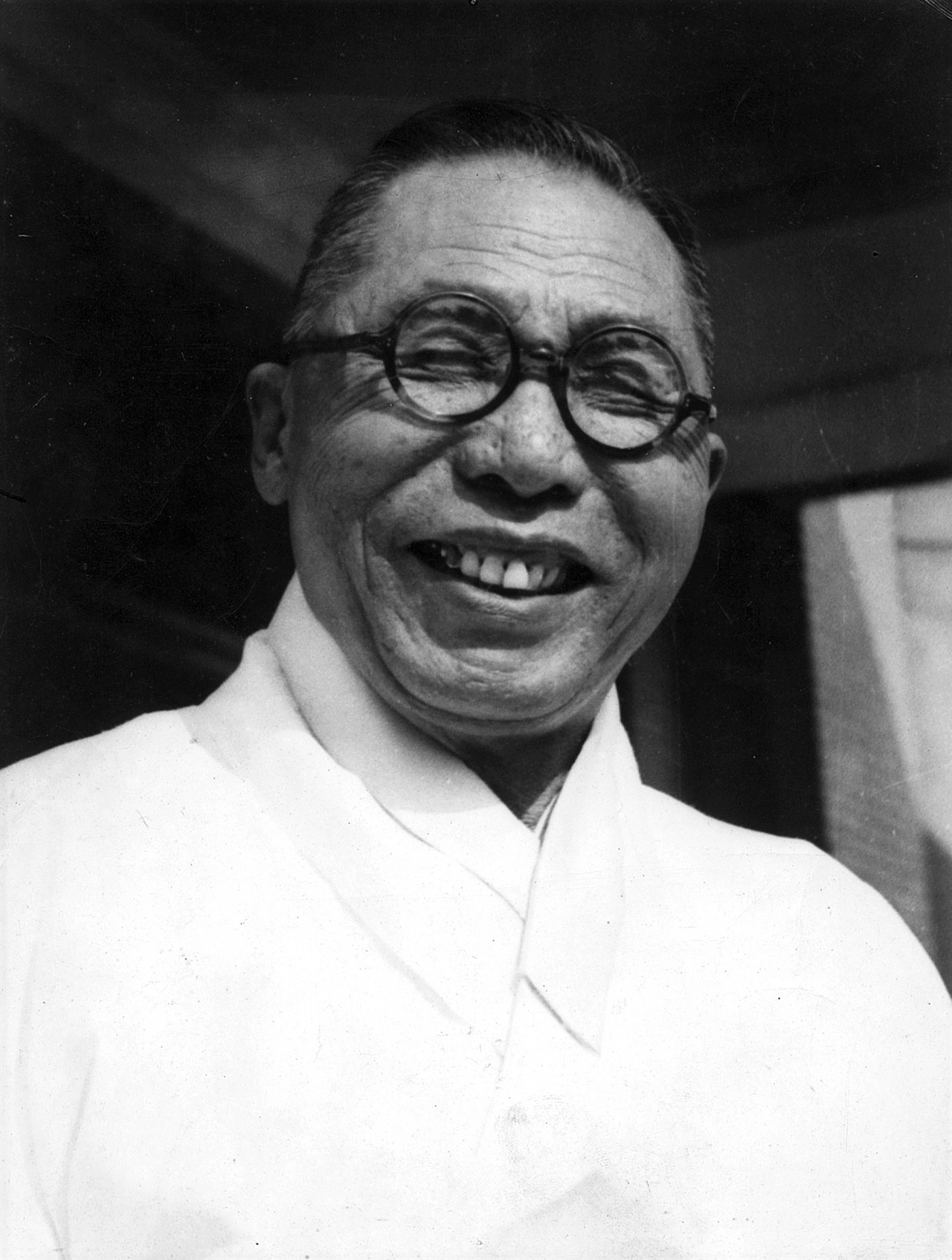
Kim Koo

- Kim Koo was the President of Provisional Government of the Republic of Korea from 1940 until 1947.
- Ryu Dong-yeol was the Chief of Staff of the Korean Liberation Army
- Ji Cheong-cheon was the Supreme Commander of the Korean Liberation Army

== Republic of Liberia ==
- Edwin Barclay was the President of Liberia from 1930 until 1944.
- William Tubman was the President of Liberia from 1944 until 1971.

== Grand Duchy of Luxembourg ==
- Grand Duchess Charlotte was head of state of Luxembourg.
- Pierre Dupong was Prime Minister of Luxembourg and later led the government in exile after the country was occupied.
- Émile Speller was Major-Commandant of the Corps des Gendarmes et Volontaires during the German invasion of Luxembourg. He was briefly held prisoner.
- Guillaume Konsbruck was a captain who fled Luxembourg following invasion and served as aide-de-camp to Grand Duchess Charlotte during her exile. He was promoted to major and returned to Luxembourg in 1944 and helped establish a new army for the country.

== Mexico (1942–1945) ==
- Manuel Ávila Camacho was Brigade General and President of Mexico from 1940 till 1946. Ávila declared war against the Axis powers in 1942 after two of Mexico's ships were destroyed by German submarines. Ávila Camacho cooperated in the war effort, providing the United States with 15,000 soldiers and 300,000 workers under the Bracero Program.
- Antonio Cárdenas Rodríguez was Colonel and Commander of the Mexican Expeditionary Air Force (Fuerza Aérea Expedicionaria Mexicana (FAEM)) since January 1, 1945. He and 300 elements from the FAEM arrived on May 1 in Manila, in Luzon, principal island of Philippines, and established in Clark Field under the 5th Air Force of the USAAF, commanded by General Douglas MacArthur. He represented Mexico at the signing of the Japanese surrender document on the USS Missouri on September 1.
- Radamés Gaxiola Andrade was Captain and Commander of the 201st Squadron (Escuadrón 201) of the FAEM, under the 58th Group of the 5th Air Force of the USAAF. He commanded Mexican air operations on Luzon and recognition flies on Formosa from June 7 to August 26, 1945. In total, the FAEM performed 59 combat missions.

== Mongolian People's Republic ==
- Khorloogiin Choibalsan was Prime Minister of Mongolia during World War II. He was also the general chief commander of the Mongolian armed forces. Troops under his command defended Khalkhiin Gol from Japan in 1939 and liberated Inner Mongolia in 1945.

== Kingdom of the Netherlands (1940–1945) ==
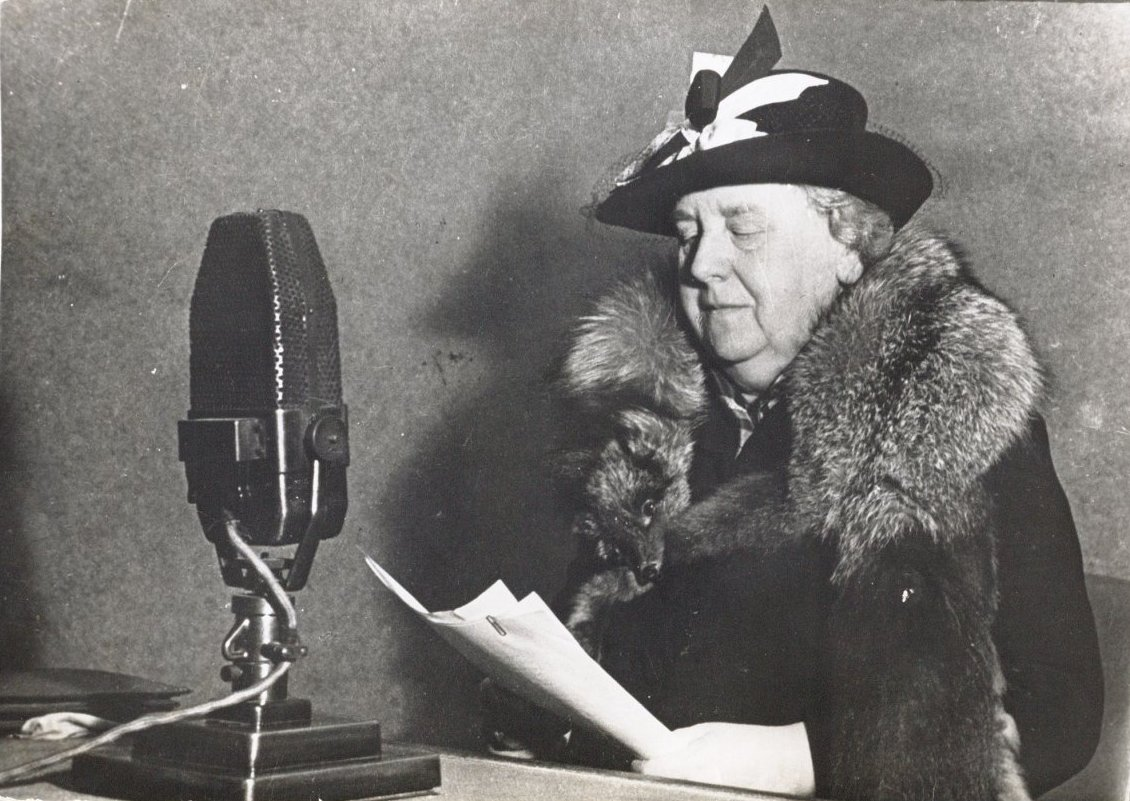
Queen Wilhelmina of the Netherlands gives a radio speech, 1940

- Wilhelmina of the Netherlands was the ruling Queen of the Netherlands. She led the Dutch government in exile after escaping to Britain.
- Prince Bernhard of Lippe-Biesterfeld was the son in law of Queen Wilhelmina and Commander-in-chief of the Armed forces of the Netherlands from 1944 until 1945, served as a Wing commander for the Royal Air Force from 1941 until 1944.
- Dirk Jan de Geer was the prime minister of the Netherlands from 1939 until 1940. When Nazi Germany invaded the Netherlands he fled to London. As he wanted to make peace with Nazi Germany, he was forced to resign.
- Pieter Sjoerds Gerbrandy was Prime Minister of the Netherlands from 1940 until 1945. After the Fall of France and Dirk Jan de Geer's resignation, Gerbrandy was appointed the office of prime minister by Queen Wilhelmina in London. After the liberation, he returned to form a new cabinet but ended up resigning.
- Henri Winkelman was Commander-in-chief of the Armed forces of the Netherlands during the Battle of the Netherlands. Winkelman was responsible for defending the Netherlands the Nazi invasion. He was captured and interned for the rest of the war.
- Alidius Tjarda van Starkenborgh Stachouwer was Governor-General of the Dutch East Indies from 1936 to 1942 when the colony was occupied by Japan.
- Conrad Helfrich was Vice Admiral of the Royal Netherlands Navy during the Netherlands East Indies campaign. At the outbreak of the war in the Pacific Helfrich assumed command of all Dutch naval units in the Dutch East Indies. On September 2, 1945, he signed the Japanese Instrument of Surrender aboard the battleship USS Missouri on behalf of the Dutch government.

== Kingdom of Norway ==
- Haakon VII of Norway was King of Norway and the formal head of state from 1905 to his death in 1957. Following the German invasion of Norway in 1940, Haakon refused to meet the demands of the attackers, and went into exile in London, where he stayed for the rest of the war.
- Johan Nygaardsvold was prime minister during the war. His government agreed with the King not to meet the German demands, and went into exile in London. Nygaardsvold resigned shortly after the war.
- Otto Ruge was Chief of Defence of Norway from May to June 1940, leading the Norwegian forces in the Norwegian Campaign. After the Germans had conquered Norway, Ruge was arrested and sent to Germany. He resumed his position for a short time after the war.
- Crown Prince Olav was Chief of Defence, leading the Norwegian forces in exile from 1 July 1944.
- Carl Gustav Fleischer was the commander of the Norwegian 6th Division during the Norwegian Campaign. He led the allied recapture of Narvik on May 28, 1940, later heading into exile in the United Kingdom, where he was named commander of the Norwegian Army in exile. He was the first commander to win a major victory against the Germans.

== Second Polish Republic ==
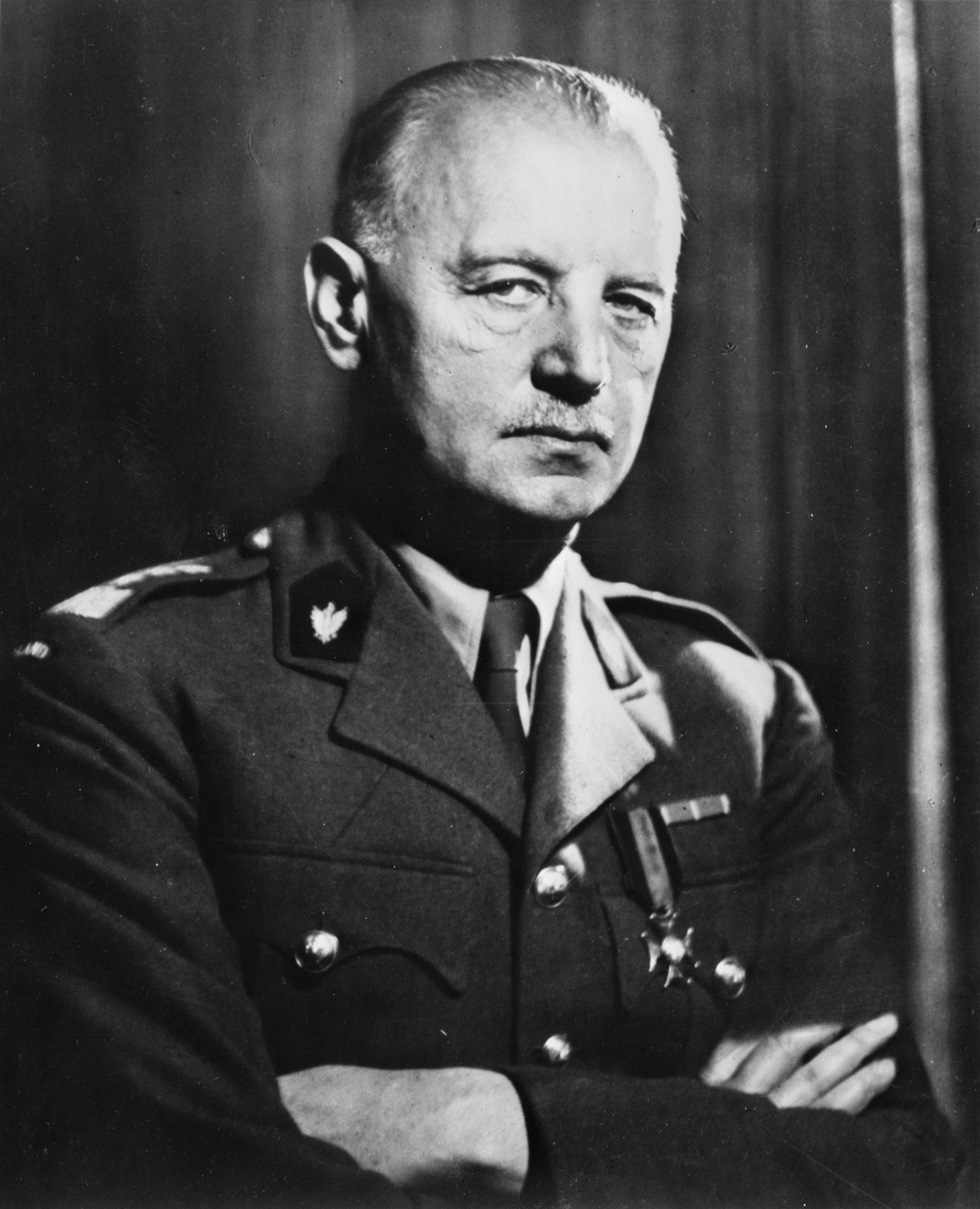
Władysław Sikorski

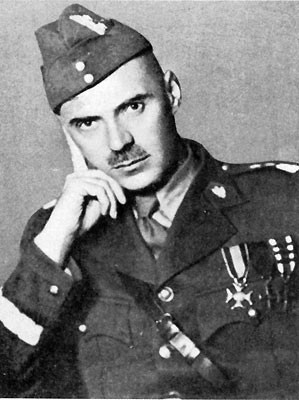
Władysław Anders

- Ignacy Mościcki was President of Poland from 1926 until 1939. After the Invasion of Poland he was forced to resign and went into exile in Switzerland.
- Felicjan Sławoj Składkowski was a Polish physician, general and politician who served as Polish Minister of Internal Affairs from 1936 to 1939 and was the last Prime Minister of Poland before World War II. After the German invasion of Poland on 1 September 1939, he fled to Romania and was interned there. After the German occupation of Romania in 1940, he went to Turkey and thence to Palestine. In 1947, he went to London, where he died in 1962.
- Edward Rydz-Śmigły was Marshal of Poland and commander of the Polish armed forces during the invasion of Poland. After the invasion; Śmigły-Rydz took complete responsibility for Poland's military defeat. He later resigned and joined the resistance movement as a common underground soldier.
- Henryk Sucharski was a major in the Polish Army. At the outbreak of World War II, he was the commander of the Westerplatte position. Troops under his command defended Westerplatte for seven days against overwhelming odds. Sucharski survived the war and was posthumously promoted to the rank of General. Despite his efforts to improve the defences, he later tried to persuade his fellow officers to surrender and suffered a nervous breakdown which required his deputy to assume command.

=== Polish Government in Exile and Secret State ===
- Władysław Raczkiewicz was the President of the Polish Government in Exile from 1939 until his death in 1947. When the Nazis invaded Poland, Raczkiewicz fled to London where he established the government in exile.
- Władysław Sikorski was Prime Minister of the Polish Government in Exile and commander of the Polish Armed Forces. A staunch advocate of the Polish cause on the diplomatic scene, he supported the reestablishment of diplomatic relations between Poland and the Soviet Union, which had been severed after the Soviet alliance with Germany. In July 1943, Sikorski was killed when his plane crashed into the sea 16 seconds after takeoff from Gibraltar.
- Stanisław Mikołajczyk succeeded Sikorski as prime minister, serving in this post from 1943 to 1944.
- Tomasz Arciszewski succeeded Mikołajczyk as prime minister, serving in this post from 1944 to 1947.
- Kazimierz Sosnkowski succeeded Sikorski as Commander-in-Chief of the Polish Armed Forces, serving in this capacity from 1943 to 1944.
- Władysław Anders was a Polish General and commander of the II Corps during the war. When Germany invaded Poland, Anders fled east and was captured by the Red Army. After the Nazi invasion of the USSR, he was released and placed in commanded of the Polish Armed Forces in the East until 1942.
- Tadeusz Bór-Komorowski was commander of the Home Army during the Warsaw Uprising.
- Stanisław Maczek was the Polish commander who had never been defeated in battle, and who fought as a commander during the Polish Soviet War, the Invasion of Poland in 1939, and from just after the initial landing in Normandy to the end of war as the commander of the 1st Armoured Division (Poland) (Hill 262, Breda, Wilhelmshaven)
- Stanisław Sosabowski was commander of the Polish 1st Independent Parachute Brigade, which fought with distinction at Arnhem.
- Marian Kukiel commander of the I Polish Corps from their formation in 1940 until 1942. He was Minister of War in exile from 1943 to 1944.
- Jan Zumbach was the Squadron Leader of the No. 303 Polish Fighter Squadron from 1942 until 1943. Zumbach never fought during the Invasion of Poland but fought during the Battle of Britain. Zumbach was awarded the Cross of Valor for his service during the war.

== Soviet Union (1941–1945) ==
Joseph Stalin

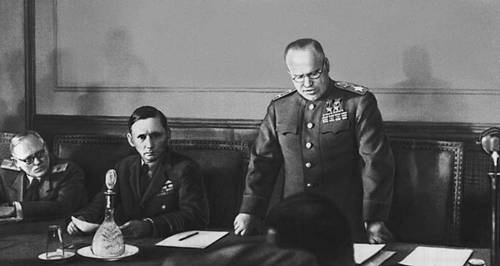
Marshal Zhukov reading the German capitulation. Seated on his right is Air Chief Marshal Arthur Tedder.

- Joseph Stalin was General Secretary of the Communist Party of the Soviet Union during World War II. From 1941 onwards, he was also Chairman of the Committee of the People's Comissars (Premier) of the Soviet Union. It was during Stalin's reign that the USSR emerged as a superpower that rivaled the United States. As the supreme commander of the Red Army, Stalin led the Red Army to liberate the Soviet Union from Nazi occupation. After the war Stalin put communist leaders in power in Eastern Europe, setting up the Eastern Bloc and leading to the Cold War.
- Kliment Voroshilov was the leader of the Soviet Army during WW2.
- Georgy Zhukov was a Soviet Field Marshal who led the Red Army to liberate the Soviet Union from Nazi occupation. He also led the Soviets to overrun much of Eastern Europe and to conquer and capture Germany's capital, Berlin. After the war Zhukov was the supreme Military Commander of the Soviet Occupation Zone in Germany.
- Ivan Isakov Chief of Staff of the Soviet Navy, Deputy USSR Navy Minister, and held the rank of Admiral. He played a crucial role in shaping the Soviet Navy, particularly the Baltic and Black Sea flotillas.
- Nikolay Gerasimovich Kuznetsov was Admiral of the Soviet Navy, which was primarily responsible for keeping the Nazis out of the Black Sea and the Caucasus. Despite orders to the contrary, he placed his navy on high alert hours before the commencement of Operation Barbarossa resulting in the Navy being the only branch of the Soviet armed forces that was prepared for the invasion.
- Vyacheslav Molotov was Foreign Minister of the Soviet Union from 1939 to 1949. He was responsible for the Molotov–Ribbentrop Pact which governed Soviet-German relations until June 1941 when Hitler attacked the Soviet Union. Molotov conducted urgent negotiations with Britain and, later, the United States for wartime alliances. He secured Franklin D. Roosevelt and Winston Churchill's agreement to create a "second front" in Europe.
- Mikhail Kalinin was during the whole war period the Chairman of the Presidium of the Supreme Soviet of the Soviet Union, the nominal Head of State of the Soviet Union. Although he was the Head of State, he remained mostly in the background, while Stalin was the undisputed war leader with supreme authority over the Soviet Union. A Communist Party elder, Kalinin was a key member of Stalin's inner circle of power until his death. He signed the order authorizing the Katyn massacre.
- Ivan Bagramyan commander of the 1st Baltic Front. He orchestrated the offensives which pushed German forces out of the Baltic republics.
- Vasily Chuikov commanded the 64th Army and later the 62nd Army, which defended Stalingrad during the crucial Battle of Stalingrad.
- Leonid Govorov became Soviet commander in Leningrad in 1942, and commanded Leningrad's forces in Operation Spark. In 1944, he was promoted to Marshal of the Soviet Union.
- Ivan Konev was commander of the 19th Army during the early days of the Nazi invasion. He led the Red Army on the Eastern Front and liberated much of Eastern Europe. He helped in the capture of Berlin.
- Kirill Meretskov commanded the 7th Army during the Winter War. He was responsible for breaking the Mannerheim Line.
- Sergei Khudyakov Marshal of the aviation and commander of the 1st Air Army.
- Konstantin Rokossovsky was made Marshal of the Soviet Union for his planning of Operation Bagration.
- Boris Shaposhnikovwas a military officer and Marshal of the Soviet Union who served as Chief of the General Staff and Deputy People's Commissar for Defence until 1943.
- Semyon Timoshenko was Marshal of the Soviet Union who lead the Red Army during the Second Battle of Kharkov and Battle of Stalingrad.
- Fyodor Tolbukhin was a Soviet military commander and Marshal of the Soviet Union who oversaw the 3rd Ukrainian Front during the Battle of Stalingrad and the Vienna offensive.
- Aleksandr Vasilevsky served as a career Russian Army office who was awarded Marshall of the Soviet Union in 1943.
- Matvei Zakharov
- Nikita Khrushchev

== United States (1941–1945) ==
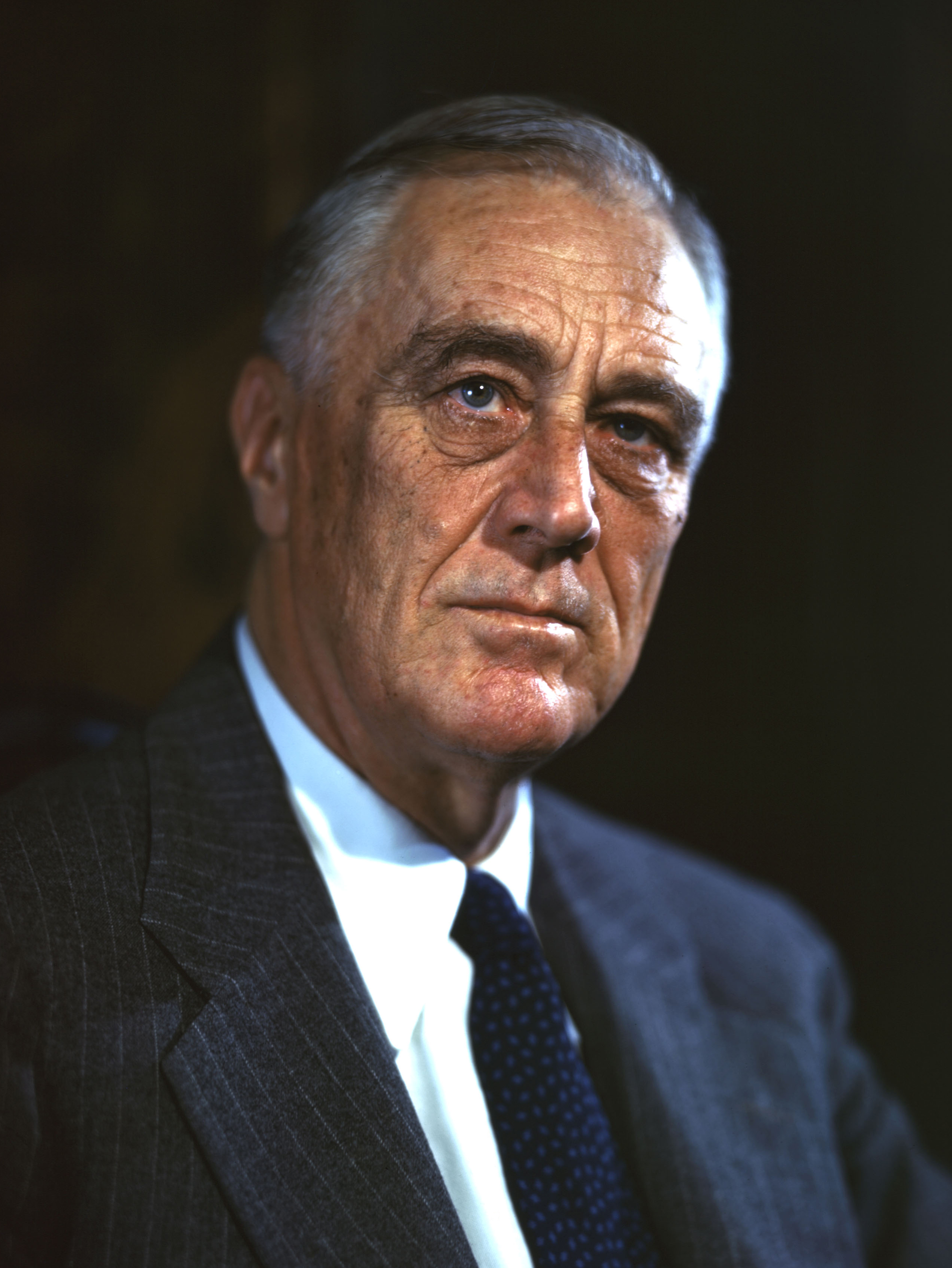
Franklin D. Roosevelt

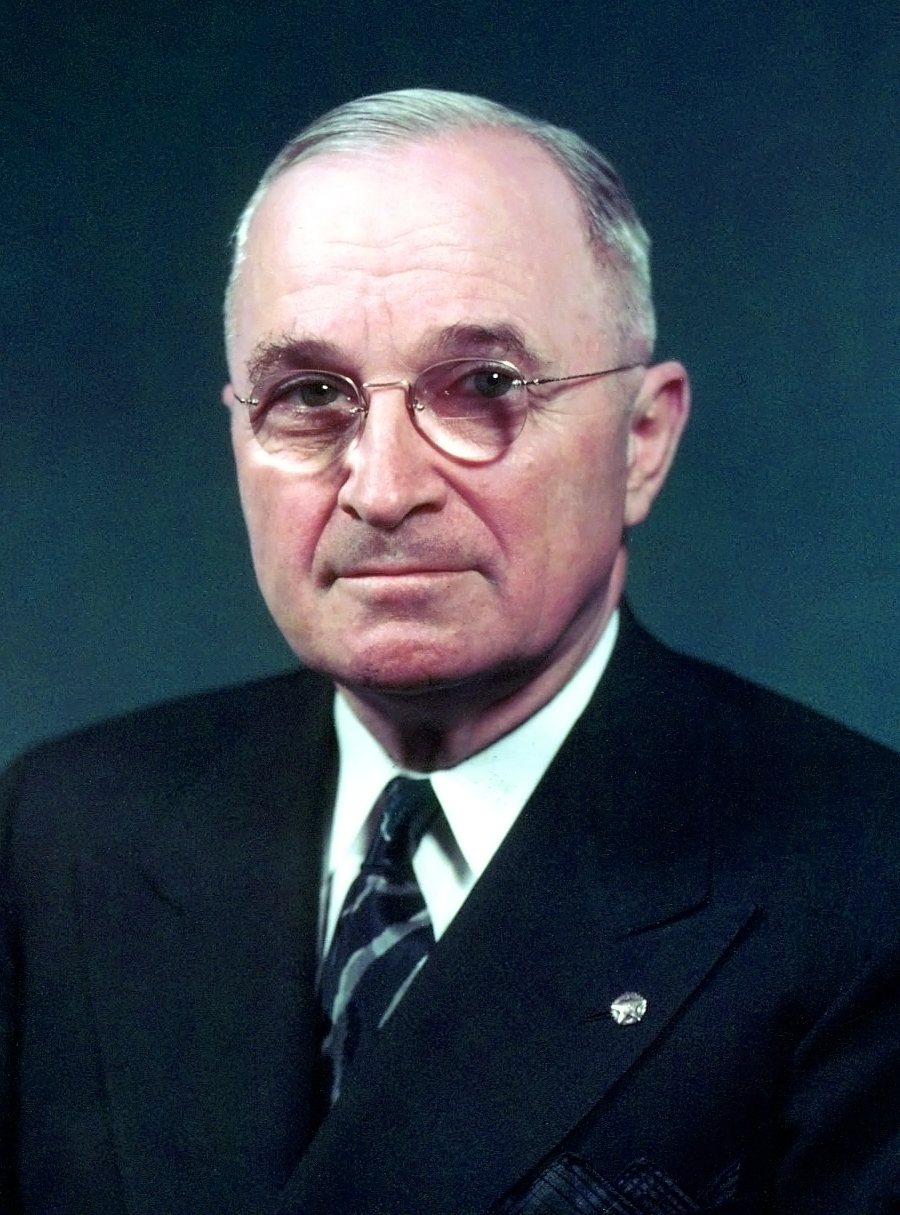
Harry S. Truman

- Franklin D. Roosevelt was the 32nd President of the United States, from 1933 until his death in 1945. Roosevelt had come into power during the Great Depression on a promise to heal the country. Prior to the attack on Pearl Harbor, he attempted to aid the Allies without declaring war. He died in office two weeks before the surrender of Germany.
- Harry S. Truman was the 33rd President of the United States from 1945 until 1953. Truman took office after the death of Roosevelt. President Truman ordered the atomic bombings of Hiroshima and Nagasaki in 1945. After the war he oversaw postwar recovery efforts.
- William D. Leahy was the Chief of Staff to the Commander in Chief and an American naval officer who served as the senior-most United States military officer on active duty during World War II. Leahy was recalled to active duty as the personal Chief of Staff to President Franklin D. Roosevelt in 1942 and served in that position throughout World War II. He chaired the Chiefs of Staff and was a major decision-maker during the war.
- George Marshall was General of the Army and the Chief of Staff during the war. As Chief of Staff, Marshall oversaw the largest military expansion in American history. Marshall coordinated Allied operations in Europe and the Pacific. After the war Marshall became Secretary of State and led the post-war reconstruction effort in Europe, which became known as the Marshall Plan. For his role in the recovery he received the Nobel Peace Prize.
- Henry H. Arnold was an American general officer holding the grades of General of the Army and later General of the Air Force. He was the Commanding General of the U.S. Army Air Forces during World War II.
- Ernest King was Commander in Chief of the United States Fleet (1941–45) as well as Chief of Naval Operations (1942–45) and Fleet Admiral (from 1944).
- Henry L. Stimson was Secretary of War from 1940 until 1945. He was an early proponent for war against Germany. As secretary of war Stimson was in charge of much of the organizational and logistical aspects of America's war effort. He oversaw the raising and training 13 million soldiers and airmen, supervised the spending of a third of the nation's GDP on the Army and the Air Forces, helped formulate military strategy, and took personal control of building and using the atomic bomb.
- Cordell Hull was Secretary of State from 1933 until 1944. Hull was responsible for foreign relations before the attack on Pearl Harbor. He sent the Hull note to Japan prior to the attack, which was part of the United States attempt to open Chinese markets to U.S. goods against Japanese interests there. After the war he was the key architect for establishing the United Nations and was awarded the Nobel Peace Prize.
- James F. Byrnes led the Office of Economic Stabilization and the Office of War Mobilization.
- William J. Donovan was the director of the Office of Strategic Services from 1942 until it was disbanded in 1945. Donovan and the OSS was responsible for collecting intelligence by the Army, Navy, and State Department. For his actions he was awarded the Distinguished Service Medal.
- J. Edgar Hoover was the director of the Federal Bureau of Investigation from 1935 until 1972. Hoover and the FBI were responsible for the intelligence in the United States and South America during the war. Hoover had success in shutting down a Nazi spy network in the United States.

=== European and North African Front ===
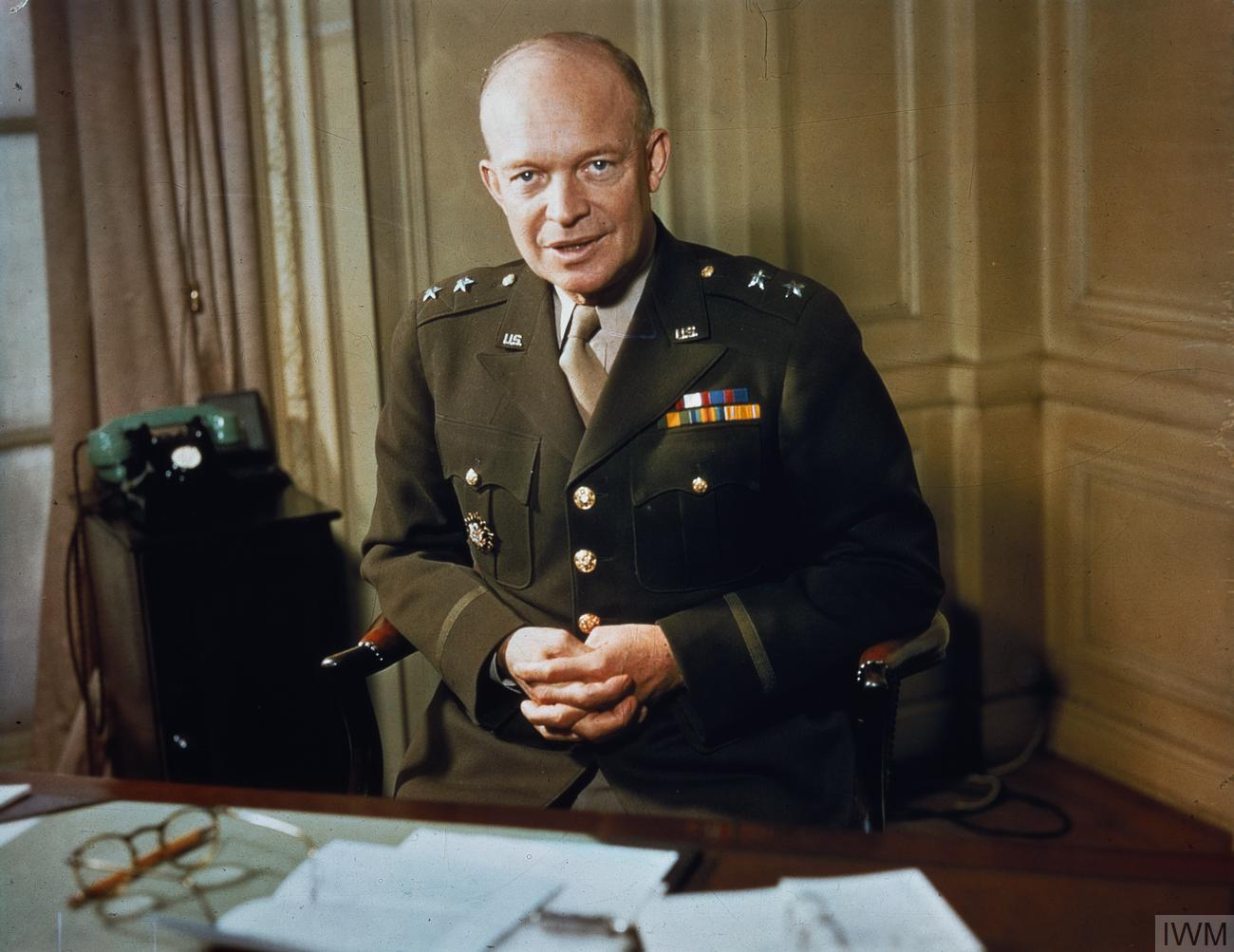
Dwight D. Eisenhower

- Dwight D. Eisenhower nicknamed "Ike", was the Supreme Commander of the Allied forces in Europe. He was responsible for planning and supervising the liberation of France and Europe with the invasion of Nazi Germany. Following the German unconditional surrender, Eisenhower was appointed Military Governor of the U.S. Occupation Zone. Seven years after the war, he was elected as president of the United States.
- Omar Bradley was General of the Army in North Africa and Europe during World War II. He led the First United States Army during Operation Overlord and the invasion of Europe. He was informally known as "the soldier's general."
- Mark W. Clark was the allied commander in the Italian Campaign. He led allied forces through the invasion of Italy, the battles of Anzio and Monte Cassino and the subsequent capture of Rome in 1944, the first of the three major axis capitals to fall.
- Jacob L. Devers was the commander of the 6th Army Group in Europe. He oversaw the invasion of southern France in 1944. With his American and French forces, Devers cleared Alsace, reduced the Colmar Pocket, crossed the Rhine River and accepted the surrender of German forces in Austria. Initially the CG of the Mediterranean Theater of Operations, in the late summer of 1942 he "swapped jobs" with Gen. Eisenhower, becoming Commanding General European Theater of Operations, freeing up Ike to command the Operation Torch invasion of North Africa in November 1942. In early 1943 he returned to command the MTO for the Sicily, Italy and Southern France Campaigns.
- John C. H. Lee was the commanding general of all supply and service forces in the ETO, beginning in May 1942. His logistics command was responsible for the Operation Bolero buildup of over 3 million men and women, and 37,000,000 tons of materiel in the UK, and delivering a total of 41,000,000 tons to support the fighting forces in the entire Theater. He was Deputy Theater Commander for Supply and Administration to Gen. Eisenhower, and he led the largest single unit in World War II. The Communications Zone, or COM-Z as it was known after D-Day numbered some 435,000 soldiers at its peak.
- George S. Patton was one of the United States' leading generals during the campaigns in North Africa, Sicily, France and Germany. He was known as "Old Blood and Guts".
- Carl Andrew Spaatz was commander of the Air Forces Combat Command with the rank of major general and in overall command of the USAAF in the European Theater of Operations.
- Royal E. Ingersoll was the commander in chief of the U.S. Atlantic Fleet from 1942 to late 1944. He commanded the American forces during the battle of the Atlantic and was employed in running troop convoys and transporting stores, munitions, and fuel to the United Kingdom and the Mediterranean.

=== Pacific Front ===
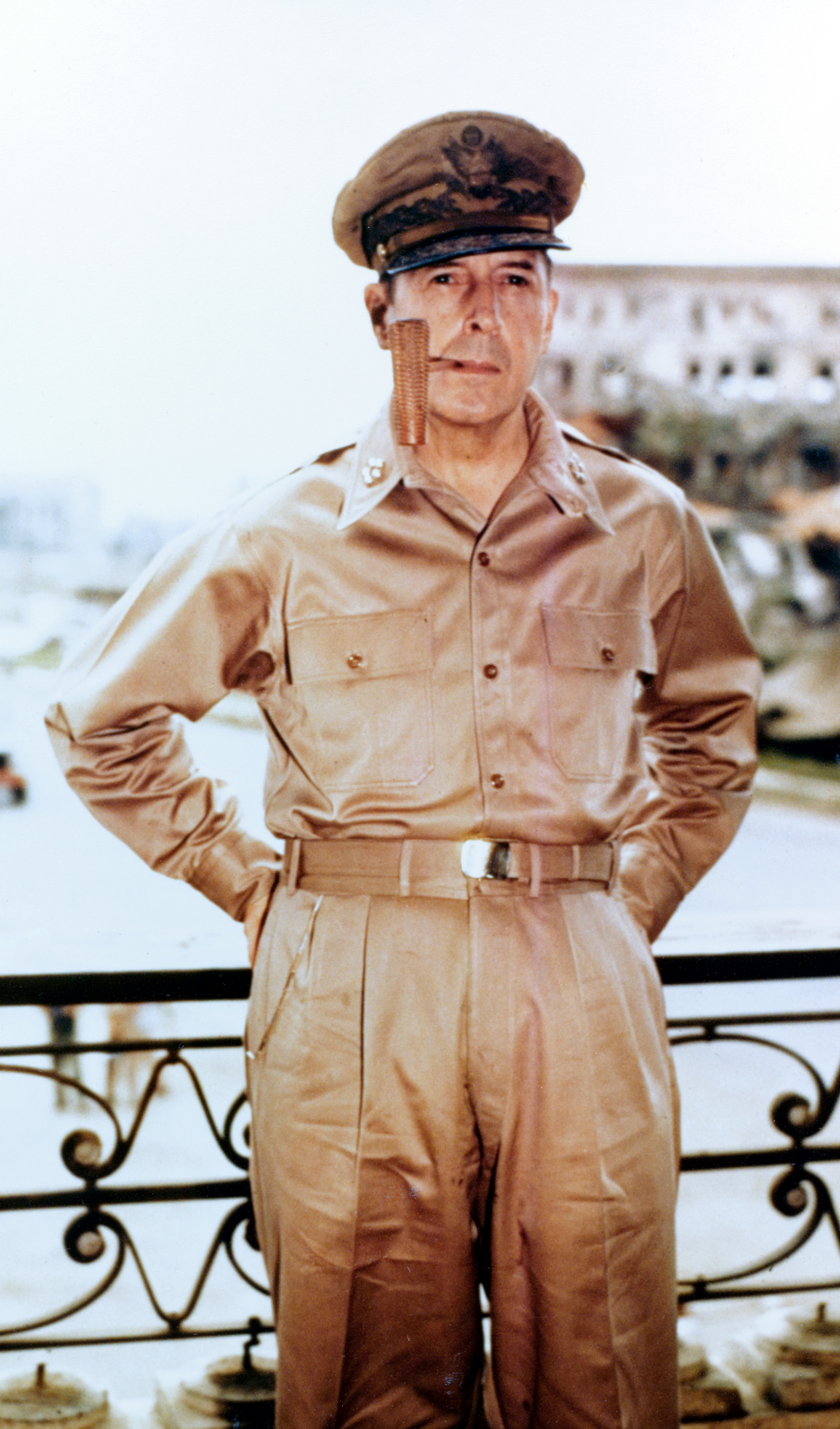
Douglas MacArthur

- Douglas MacArthur, General of the Army was Supreme Commander of Allied Forces in the South West Pacific Area, 1942–45. He was commander of US and Filipino forces in the Philippines, before relocating to Australia. He accepted the surrender of Japan on September 2, 1945, and then became Supreme Commander Allied Powers.
- Chester W. Nimitz, fleet admiral and commander of the United States Pacific Fleet in 1941–42 and became supreme commander of Allied forces in the Pacific Ocean Area, 1942–45.
- Holland Smith was a general in the United States Marine Corps during World War II. He is sometimes called the "father" of modern U.S. amphibious warfare. He led American forces in several major campaigns, among others those in the Aleutians, Gilberts-Marshalls islands, Saipan, and Iwo Jima.
- Joseph Stilwell, was a general who was Chiang Kai-shek's chief of staff and commander of all US forces in China, Burma and India as well as deputy commander of South East Asia Command
- William Halsey Jr. fleet admiral who commanded the Third Fleet, formed in 1943, and appeared in the Guadalcanal campaign and the Battle of Leyte Gulf.
- Raymond A. Spruance commanded United States Navy forces at both the Battle of Midway and the Battle of the Philippine Sea.
- Frank Jack Fletcher was commander of the Allied Naval forces at the Battle of the Coral Sea.
- Curtis LeMay was a general in the United States Air Force. He is credited with designing and implementing an effective, but also controversial, systematic strategic bombing campaign in the Pacific theater of World War II.
- Husband E. Kimmel was commander-in-chief of the United States Pacific Fleet when the Japanese attacked the naval base at Pearl Harbor. After the attack, he was relieved of his command.
- Walter Short was commander-in-chief of the Army forces at Pearl Harbor.
- William S. Parsons was an American admiral. He was the weaponeer of the aircraft Enola Gay, which dropped the atomic bomb on Hiroshima in 1945. He worked on the Manhattan Project.
- Paul Tibbets was a United States Air Force general who flew the Enola Gay, along with Parsons, over Hiroshima.
- Alexander Vandegrift was United States Marine Corps four star general who commanded forces at the Battle for Henderson Field.

=== Puerto Rico ===
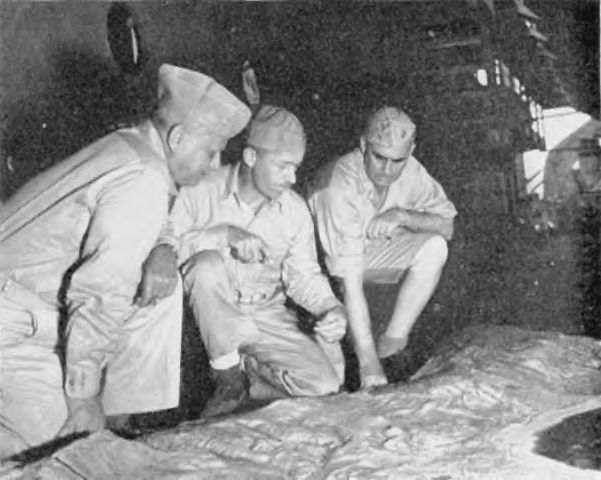
Left to right: Major General Geiger, Corps Commander; Colonel Silverthorn, Corps Chief of Staff and Brigadier General del Valle, Corps Artillery Commander, examine a plaster relief map of Guam on board the USS Appalachian.

- Rexford Tugwell, Tugwell served as the last appointed American Governor of Puerto Rico, from 1941 to 1946. He worked with the legislature to create the Puerto Rico Planning, Urbanization, and Zoning Board in 1942. Tugwell supported Puerto Rican self-government through amendment to the Organic Act in 1948. He publicly supported Luis Muñoz Marín's Popular Democratic Party, the PPD, which wanted a Commonwealth status. As he prepared to retire from the Governorship, Tugwell was instrumental in getting the first Puerto Rican appointed to the job, Jesús T. Piñero, then serving as Resident Commissioner in Washington, D.C. Tugwell also served as Chancellor of the University of Puerto Rico.
- Virgil R. Miller, Colonel, U.S. Army, was the Regimental Commander of the 442d Regimental Combat Team (RCT), a unit which was composed of "Nisei" (second generation Americans of Japanese descent), during World War II. He led the 442nd in its rescue of the Lost Texas Battalion of the 36th Infantry Division, in the forests of the Vosges Mountains in northeastern France.
- Pedro del Valle, was a highly decorated Marine lieutenant general who played a key role in the Guadalcanal Campaign and the Battle of Guam and became the Commanding General of the First Marine Division. Del Valle played an instrumental role in the defeat of the Japanese forces in Okinawa and was in charge of the reorganization of Okinawa.
- Juan César Cordero Dávila, was a brigadier general who in World War II commanded the 65th Infantry Regiment (United States), a Puerto Rican unit, in Europe.

=== Commonwealth of the Philippines ===
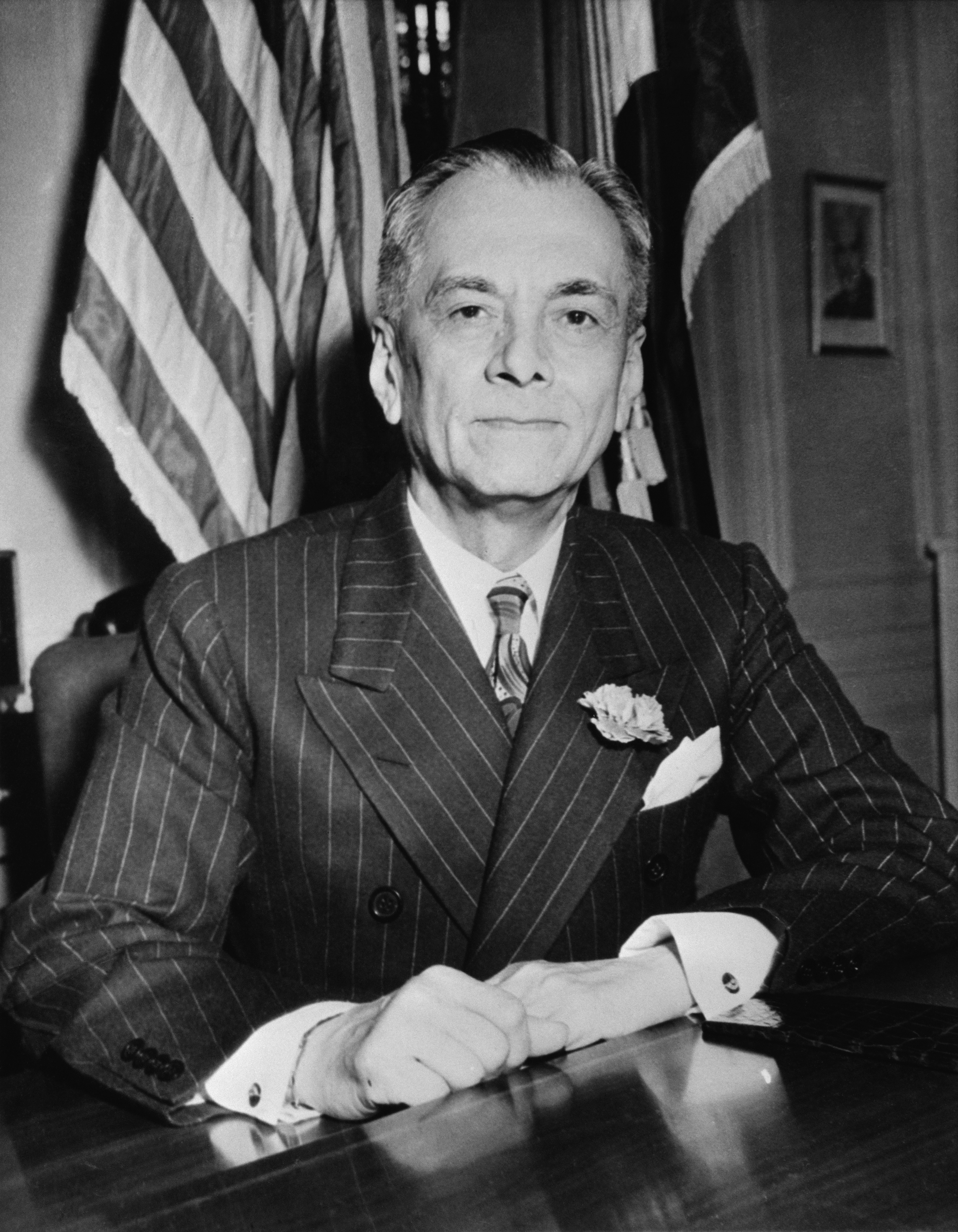
Manuel L. Quezon

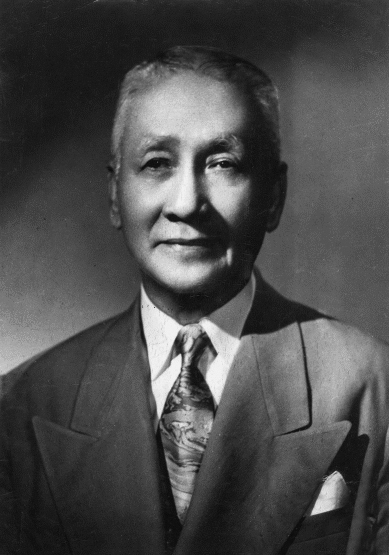
Sergio Osmeña

- Manuel L. Quezon was the first Filipino president of the Commonwealth of the Philippines under U.S. rule in the early period of the 20th century. After the Japanese invasion, he was evacuated to Washington, D.C. Still in exile, he died of tuberculosis in Saranac Lake, New York in 1944.
- Sergio Osmeña was the second Filipino president of the Commonwealth of the Philippines. As Vice President, he ascended to the presidency after Quezon's death in 1944. He returned to the Philippines the same year with General Douglas MacArthur and the liberation forces.
- Basilio J. Valdes was the commanding general of the Philippine Commonwealth Army and chief of staff of the Armed Forces of the Philippines. Valdes was given the rank of Major General of the Commonwealth Army. After the Japanese Invasion, he was evacuated to Washington, D.C., and he was returned to the Philippines the same year with General Douglas MacArthur and the liberation forces.
- Vicente Lim commanded the Philippine Commonwealth Army during the early days of the war. Lim was given the rank of Brigadier General and became the top ranking Filipino under General MacArthur. He was placed in command of the 41st Infantry Division, Philippine Commonwealth Army, USAFFE tasked with the defense of Bataan. After the fall of the Philippines, he led resistance against Japanese occupation.

== Kingdom of Yugoslavia ==
- Peter II was the last King of Yugoslavia reigning from 1934 till 1945. An opponent of Nazi Germany, he participated in a British-supported coup d'état opposing the Prince Regent, Prince Paul. Peter was forced to leave the country following the Axis invasion. In 1944, he signed the Treaty of Vis which was an agreement to share power with Josip Broz Tito. But, after the war, Peter was deposed in a referendum held by the Communist government.
- Draža Mihailović was the leader of Chetniks, the royalist resistance movement, supported by the exiled royal government until August 1944, when the government switched support to Josip Broz Tito's Partisans under British pressure. Mihailović was decorated with the highest war medals by France and the United States (Legion of Merit). After the war, he was executed by the newly formed Communist government of Tito in 1945 for high treason, war crimes and crimes against humanity. In 2015, he was rehabilitated by the High Court of Serbia.
- Dušan Simović was the Chief of the General Staff of the Royal Yugoslav Army and prime minister.
- Slobodan Jovanović was the prime minister of the Yugoslav government in exile during World War II from January 11, 1942, to June 26, 1943.
- Ivan Šubašić was the prime minister of the Yugoslav government in exile when the Treaty of Vis (or Tito-Šubašić Agreement) was signed on June 14, 1944.

=== Yugoslav Partisans ===
- Josip Broz Tito was a leader of Yugoslav Partisans resistance movement, which was the largest in Europe. Communist by political orientation, Tito was nevertheless able to gather nationwide support for anti-fascist cause, and to persuade Allied governments that only his forces were mounting credible resistance to Axis powers in Yugoslavia. By the end of war, occupied Yugoslavia had drawn attention of no less than 20 German divisions alone, prompting several major operations in the 1942–1944 period, which were futile. Finally, with help from advancing Soviet forces, the Partisans liberated Yugoslavia, reaching at the final days of operations a respectable size of 800,000 soldiers.
- Slavko Rodić was a officer in the Yugoslav partisan who oversaw the liberation of Sarajevo.

== Vietnam ==
=== Viet Minh ===
- Ho Chi Minh was the leader of Viet Minh and the Indochinese Communist Party who served as the founder and first president of the Democratic Republic of Vietnam from 1945.
- Võ Nguyên Giáp was the military commander of People’s Army of Vietnam. Viet Minh troops under his command liberated Vietnam in 1945.
- Trường Chinh was the General Secretary of the Indochinese Communist Party from 1941 to 1951.
- Nguyễn Lương Bằng was the Director of the General Department of Việt Minh from 1941 to 1945.

=== Vanguard Youth ===
- Phạm Ngọc Thạch was a Vietnamese revolutionary who served as the chairman of the Vanguard Youth.

=== Anti-Japanese Catholic forces ===
- Thaddeus Lê Hữu Từ was a Vietnamese Catholic prelate, was an ardent opponent of French colonialism and Vietnamese communism and Japanese imperialism.

=== Bình Xuyên ===
- Dương Văn Dương was a Vietnamese military leader who served as the first Supreme commander of Bình Xuyên forces. Under his command, Binh Xuyen cooperated with the communist Việt Minh to against the Japanese and French.
- Lê Văn Viễn was the deputy commander of Binh Xuyen and successor of Dương Văn Dương.

== See also ==
- Allies of World War II
- Axis leaders of World War II
- Commanders of World War II
- Neutral powers during World War II
- Opposition to World War II
