= Hjalmar Rechnitzer =

Danish naval officer (1872–1953)

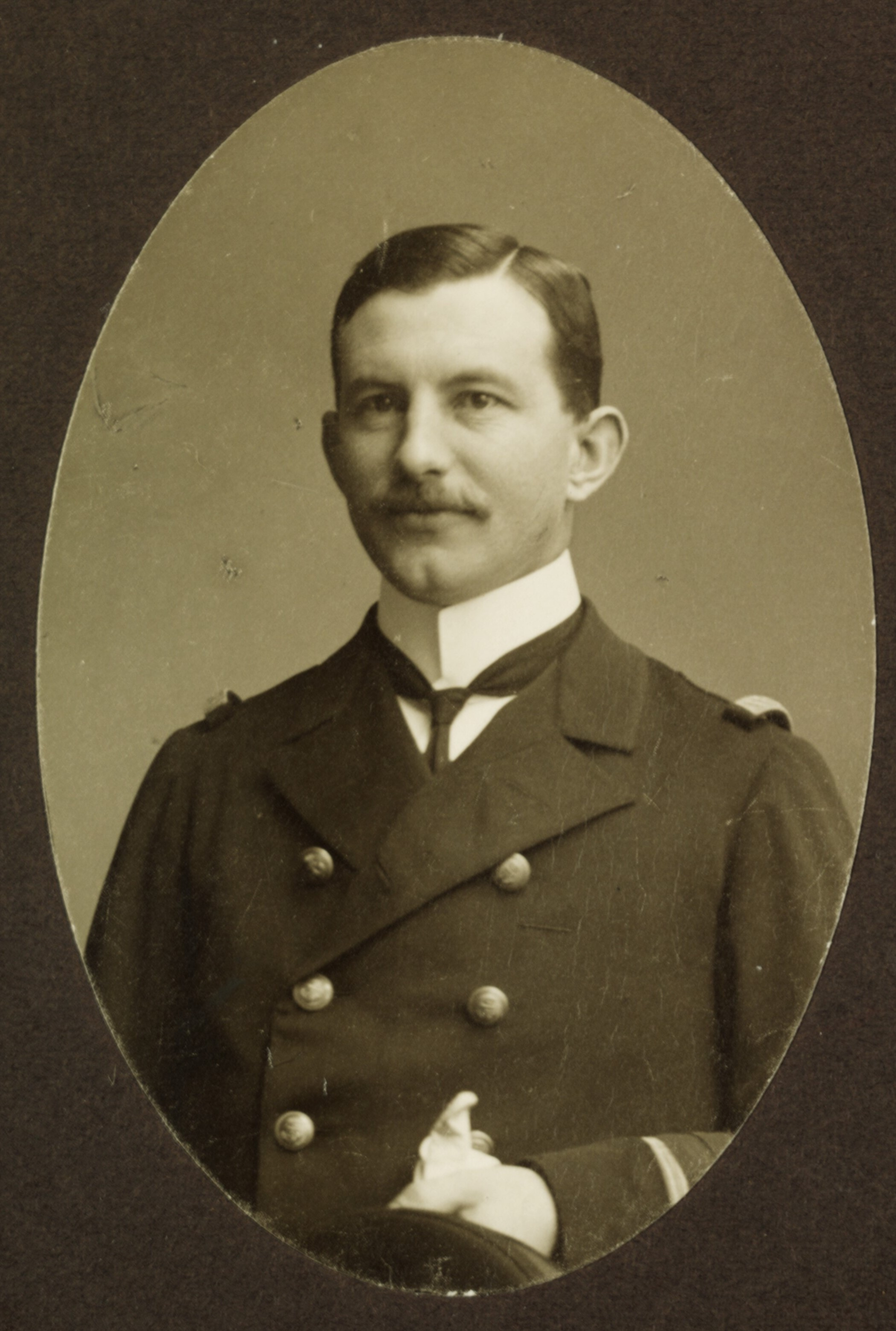
- Born: 1 December 1872; Aalborg, Kingdom of Denmark
- Died: 21 June 1953 (aged 80)
- Buried: Almen Kirkegård
- Allegiance: Denmark
- Rank: Vice admiral
- Spouse: Emily Adolph (m. 1920)

Hjalmar Rechnitzer (1 December 1872 – 21 June 1953) was a Danish naval officer. Rechnitzer was, up until the occupation of Denmark and shortly afterwards as vice admiral, director of the Ministry of the Navy, commander of the Naval Command and thus effectively commander of the entire Navy. Shortly after the occupation, four of his subordinate commanders informed him that he had lost the trust of the personnel, after which he resigned. In the years after the Second World War, Rechnitzer has been considered partly responsible for Denmark's disarmament and thus defeat, while some later assessments have considered the implemented policy – called the German course – to be realistic.

Rechnitzer was born in Aalborg, the son of businessman and consul Peter Petersen Rechnitzer and his wife Louise Marie, née Møller. He had more courage for life as a naval officer than a businessman and became a cadet in 1892. After his appointment as first lieutenant in 1901, he married Emily Adolph in 1902.

In 1905, Rechnitzer first joined the Ministry of the Navy. He showed aptitude for the service as a civil servant, and the majority of his career was spent there, supplemented by a major role in the development of the Danish submarine force and shorter summer cruises. In the ministry he showed, among other things, a talent for strategic analysis of Denmark's situation, and he contributed to the development of the policy of neutrality in Germany's shadow – the German course.

Political demands for cuts and resource rivalry with the Army made Rechnitzer unpopular in the naval officer corps. His service in the ministry ("outside number") at one point prevented an appointment, but politicians inserted a special provision in a defense law in his favor (hence the name lex Rechnitzer). This did not help his popularity either.

At the outbreak of World War II on 1 September 1939, Rechnitzer began a detailed diary. He was able to do this because he only went home to his family on weekends. After his resignation, he prepared his typewritten memoirs, which were not published until 2003.

The occupation of Denmark on 9 April 1940, without a fight was seen as dishonourable by large parts of the army and navy. One of the reasons was that Rechnitzer had failed to order security service 3 (which means the highest alert level) for the navy. This led to four senior commanders under Rechnitzer shortly afterwards urging him to resign – a request he complied with.

Rechnitzer died in 1953. The funeral took place from Bispebjerg crematorium, and the urn was placed at Almen Cemetery in Aalborg.

== Sources ==
- Hans Christian Bjerg: Admiral Rechnitzers Maritime og Politiske Erindringer 1905-40, Gyldendal, 2003, ISBN 87-02-01834-9. Based on Rechnitzer's manuscript with an introduction (18 pages) and notes by Bjerg (in Danish).
- Biography at navalhistory.dk (in Danish).
