= Almen Kirkegård =

Cemetery in Aalborg, Denmark

Coordinates: 57°02′41″N 9°54′30″E

The Almen Kirkegård (meaning "General Cemetery") in Aalborg, Denmark is located in serene and green surroundings. Located in Hasserisgade, it is one of the three cemeteries of the Aalborg Municipality; the other two are the Southern Cemetery at Blomstermarken and the Eastern Cemetery at Filstedvej. This General Cemetery is the ground where many luminaries of the city have been buried after whom many streets in the city have been named. Aalborg, Park & Nature who are responsible for the upkeep of the cemetery have brought out a directory with names of the celebrities buried here who have richly contributed to the development of the city.

== History ==
Aalborg's cemeteries have a history dating to the end of the Middle Ages. The earliest was the Sankt Jørgens Kirkegård (St George's Cemetery) which is at the corner of Hasserisgade and Kirkegårdsgade, in a district outside the city. This was mostly used to bury people who had died of plague in a nearby hospice, Sankt Jørgens Gårde. In 1794, a new cemetery was started in Klostermarken, immediately to the south of Sankt Jørgens Kirkegård, which underwent extensions in 1804, 1820 and 1870. This cemetery is now known as Aalborgs Almen Kirkegård, meaning "General cemetery". It has the graves of many of the city's most notable citizens.

== Development ==
Development plans were prepared for each of the three cemeteries maintained by the Technical and Environmental Administration of Parks and Nature of Aalborg Municipality. This plan caters to future expansion as well. Under this planning, the General Cemetery, which is an urban cemetery, is provided with avenues and laid out on right axes.
