= List of Danish nurses =

This is a list of Danish nurses.

== B ==
- Ellen Johanne Broe (1900–1994), nurse and nursing educator

== C ==
- Louise Conring (1824–1891), first trained nurse in Denmark, head of Copenhagen's Deaconess Institute
- Connie Kruckow (born 1953), nurse and union leader, headed the Danish Nurses' Organization from 2000 to 2009

== F ==
- Ilia Fibiger (1817–1867), writer, nurse, Denmark's first professional nurse
- Thora Fiedler (1854–1941), nurse, prosthetist, inventor, nursing home principal

== H ==
- Bodil Hellfach (1856–1941), nurse, deputy head of the Danish Nurses' Organization

== J ==
- Victoria Jensen (1847–1930), deaconess, nursing supervisor, from 1914 head of Copenhagen's Deaconess Institute

== M ==
- Charlotte Munck (1876–1932), nurse, trade unionist, important figure in the training of nurses

== N ==
- Charlotte Norrie (1855–1940), nursing campaigner and women's rights activist

== R ==
- Christiane Reimann (1888–1979), first Danish nursing graduate, secretary of the International Council of Nurses

== S ==
- Merry Elisabeth Scheel (1929–2007), nursing theorist, writer
- Kirsten Stallknecht (1937–2021), nurse, president of the International Council of Nurses
- Henny Tscherning (1853–1932), nurse and trade unionist, headed the Danish Nurses Organization from 1899 to 1927

== Z ==
- Sophie Zahrtmann (1841–1925), deaconess, nurse, head of Copenhagen's Deaconess Institute

== See also ==
- List of Danish people
- List of nurses
