= Victoria Jensen =

Danish deaconess and nursing supervisor

Victoria Boline Frederikke Jensen (1847–1930) was a Danish deaconess and nursing supervisor. From 1914, she headed the Danish Deaconess Institute, succeeding Sophie Zahrtmann. She was also the driving force behind the establishment of a hospital in India by the Foreign Christian Missionary Society, known in Denmark as Ydre Mission.

== Biography ==
Born on 16 January 1847 in Copenhagen, Jensen was the daughter of Peter Jensen, a porcelain merchant, and his wife Kristine Marie Hansen. She grew up with her four siblings in the Nørrebro district of Copenhagen. While still young, she was influenced by Rudolph Frimodt (1828–1879) who headed Copenhagen's Inner Mission. After working for a few years as a housekeeper in Holbæk, from 1874 she began training as a deaconess at the Copenhagen Deaconess Institute. On completing the course, she was immediately sent to Randers Hospital where she worked with fellow deaconess Anna Marie Boyesen who ensured her further training. In 1876, Jensen was appointed head nurse at Frederiksberg Hospital where she remained for 38 years. In 1877, she was installed as a deaconess. She lived at the Deaconess Institute for the rest of her life.

Jensen, who oversaw important changes at Frederiksberg Hospital, was instrumental in organizing systematic nurses' training there. As the establishment grew from a small hospital with just 50 patients to accommodate as many as 700, she introduced separate departments for medicine, surgery and mental illness. Thanks to her training initiatives, she received honorary membership of the Danish Nurses' Organization. In 1912, Charlotte Munck, who headed the organization, wrote of Jensen's "wise and skillful management" at Frediksberg Hospital.

When Sophie Zahrtmann retired as head of the Deaconess Institute in 1914, Jensen was invited to take her place. Owing to her age (now 67) and an arthritic condition, she agreed to take up the post but only for a period of five years. With the First World War and the institute's budgetary problems, it proved a difficult time. She did nevertheless design a training program for young nurses at the institute, fully in accordance with the requirements of the nurses' organization.

Jensen also participated in other organizations, especially the Ydre Mission, where she was the driving force behind the establishment of a hospital in India around the turn of the century. From 1904, she was also an active member of the newly established Kristelig Forening for Sygeplejersker (Christian Association for Nurses). On her retirement in 1919, Jensen was awarded the Danish Medal of Merit.

Victoria Jensen died on 28 May 1930 in Frederiksberg and is buried in Solbjerg Park Cemetery.
