= Rescue Preparedness Medal =

The Rescue Preparedness Medal
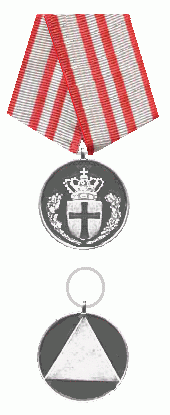
- Awarded for: Participation in international operations outside the borders of Denmark
- Description: Worn in a white ribbon with red edges and two red central stripes. Obverse has Danish shield. The year and mission name is engraved on the reverse, surrounded by oak leaves
- Country: Denmark
- Presented by: Director of the Danish Emergency Management Agency
- Eligibility: Members of the Danish Emergency Management Agency
- Post-nominals: R.B
- Status: Active
- Established: 20 April 1994
- Ribbon of the medal

Precedence
- Next (higher): Badge of Honor of the League of Civil Defense
- Next (lower): Fire Department Long Service Medal

The Rescue Preparedness Medal (Danish: Redningsberedskabets Medalje) was instituted in 1994 by Queen Margrethe II and may be awarded to any member of the Danish Emergency Management Agency for participation in international humanitarian operations outside the borders of the Kingdom of Denmark.

The medal was created in 1994, but was awarded to persons who had participated in international operations after April 1, 1991.

== Inscriptions ==
Below is a list of known inscriptions:

- Afghanistan 1991
- Iran 1991
- Iraq 1991
- Sri Lanka 1991–1992
- Siberia 1991–1992
- St. Petersburg 1991
- The Baltics 1992
- Turkey 1992
- Somalia 1992
- Somalia 1993
- Afghanistan 1994
- Former Yugoslavia 1991
- Former Yugoslavia 1992
- Former Yugoslavia 1992–1993
- Former Yugoslavia 1993
- Former Yugoslavia 1993–1994
- Former Yugoslavia 1994
- Former Yugoslavia 1994–1995
- Former Yugoslavia 1995
- Romania 1992
- Bosna 1997
- Former Yugoslavia 1997–1998
- Liberia 1997–1998
- Albania 1999
- Kosovo 1999
- Macedonia 1999
- Kosovo 2001
- Afghanistan 2002
- Iran 2003
- Banda Aceh 2004
- Pakistan 2005
- Lebanon 2006
- Lebanon 2007
- Sumatra 2009
- Chile 2010
- Haiti 2010
- Albania 2010
- Pakistan 2010
- Sierra Leone 2014–2015

== See also ==
- List of orders, decorations, and medals of the Kingdom of Denmark
