= Ministry of Resilience and Preparedness (Denmark) =

Government ministry of Denmark

- Ministeriet for Samfundssikkerhed og Beredskab
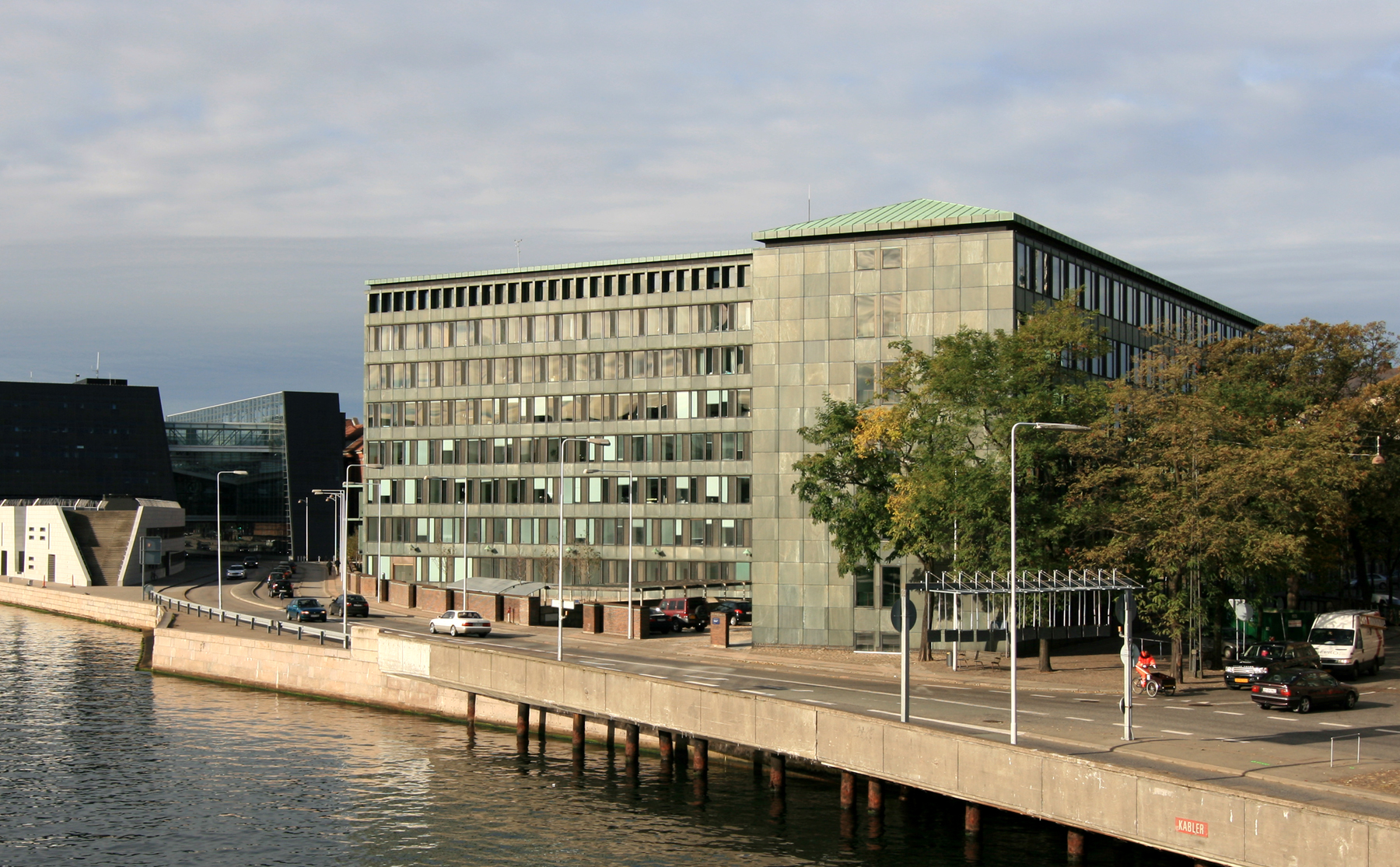

Ministry overview
- Formed: 29 August 2024; 23 months ago
- Jurisdiction: Denmark
- Headquarters: Slotsholmsgade 12; 1218 København K
- Minister responsible: Lisbeth Bech-Nielsen
- Ministry executive: Lisbet Zilmer-Johns, Permanent secretary
- Website: mssb.dk

The Ministry of Resilience and Preparedness (Danish: Ministeriet for Samfundssikkerhed og Beredskab) is a ministry in the Kingdom of Denmark which was established on 29 August 2024. It is generally responsible for public security and civil defence, encompassing areas such as cyber security, and disaster prevention and emergency management.

The ministry was presented on 28 August 2024, as part of the following day's cabinet reshuffle in the Frederiksen II Cabinet, where Torsten Schack Pedersen was appointed as Minister of Resilience and Preparedness. Division Manager in the Ministry of Justice, Morten Duus-Larsen, was appointed acting permanent secretary in the ministry. On December 10, Lisbet Zilmer-Johns was appointed permanent secretary, and Morten Duus-Larsen moved to the Danish Security and Intelligence Service as Director of Legal Affairs.

The ministry's areas of responsibility include coordination of national crisis control, national operative staff, fire and rescue services, coastal rescue service, 112 call centres, cyber security, security incidents regarding critical infrastructure at sea and cases concerning the disposal of radioactive waste.

== Authorities ==
- Danish Emergency Management Agency
  - Centre of Emergency Communication
  - Coastal Rescue Service
- Danish Resilience Agency
  - Centre for Cyber Security
  - National Operative Staff

== List of ministers ==
No.	Portrait	Name (born-died)	Term of office			Political party	Government	Ref.
No.	Portrait	Name (born-died)	Took office	Left office	Time in office	Political party	Government	Ref.
Minister of Resilience and Preparedness (Minister for Samfundssikkerhed og Beredskab)
1		Torsten Schack Pedersen (born 1976)	29 August 2024	3 June 2026	1 year, 278 days	Venstre	Frederiksen II	
2		Lisbeth Bech-Nielsen (born 1982)	3 June 2026	Incumbent	67 days	Green Left	Frederiksen III	
