= Ellen Broe =

Danish nurse and nursing educator (1900–1994)

Ellen Johanne Broe
- Born: 11 February 1900; Horsens, Denmark
- Died: 1 September 1994 (aged 94); Copenhagen, Denmark
- Other name: Ellen Broe
- Occupation: nurse
- Known for: pioneer in nursing education in Denmark and internationally

Ellen Johanne Broe (11 February 1900 – 1 September 1994) was a Danish nurse who spent several decades working and seeking education abroad before returning to Denmark and helping to establish educational and training initiatives in Denmark. She helped draft minimum curriculum requirements for nursing students, as well as continuing education guidelines. She was active in the International Council of Nurses (ICN) and sought to find ways to bring nursing education to developing areas most in need of trained nursing staff. She received the Florence Nightingale Medal in 1961 for her contributions to nursing excellence.

== Early life ==
Ellen Johanne Broe was born on 11 February 1900, in Horsens, Denmark, to Anna (née Raahauge) and Peter Johannes Broe. She was the youngest child in the family, which had three daughters. Her father was a pastor at the local prison. She completed her secondary education at Horsens State School in 1916. Then, because she wanted to travel and she saw nursing as a way to do that, Broe enrolled in a student nursing program at Bispebjerg Hospital in 1919, but was rejected by Charlotte Munck, the head of the program, because she was too young. Broe moved to England, where she had a sister living with her English spouse and remained until 1921, when she was accepted into the program at Bispebjerg now that she was almost 22, the minimum age for admission. She competed her training in 1924.

== Career ==
Broe began her career at Otto Møller's Birth Clinic but, encouraged by Munck, she shortly afterwards took a job as a private nurse with an English family who lived in Morocco. She then worked as a private nurse in Paris and later in the Netherlands. In 1930, she studied and worked at the East Harlem Nursing and Health Service and New York City's Presbyterian Hospital, but had to return to Denmark to care for her father who was ailing. She became head of the Hald Sanatorium briefly and then began working at the Central Tuberculosis Center in Copenhagen. In 1933, Broe became the head nurse at Sundby Hospotal, which had just opened in the Copenhagen district of Sundby, serving there until 1938. During her tenure she helped establish a continuing education curriculum for nurses to help reduce infant mortality. The work was influential and allowed her to take a leave of absence and study nursing organization and administration at Teachers College, Columbia University in New York City during the 1936-1937 term, along with Elisabeth Larsen and Ellen Margrethe Schrøder. The curriculum also spurred the adoption of legislation in 1937, titled the Law on Control of Morbidity and Mortality to establish standards. The National Board of Health created guidelines for teaching nurses at Aarhus University, the leading trainer of nurses until the Danish Nursing School opened in 1938.

Simultaneously, Broe became involved with the Danish Nurses Organisation (Danish: Dansk Sygeplejeråd (DSR)). Between 1934 and 1935, she served on the Committee for Additional Training and from 1934 to 1950, worked among others on the Building Committee. From 1938, Broe served on DSR's Teaching Committee and was its chair between 1943 and 1946. The committee task was to propose minimum curriculum for nursing students along with basic educational prerequisites. When Broe returned from study in New York in 1938, she was hired as training manager for the new program offered at Aarhus University to train nurses and senior nurses. It was a twelve-year appointment, marked with three sabbaticals. Broe joined the Danish Florence Nightingale Committee and the Nurses' Cooperative of Nordic Countries (Danish: Sygeplejerskers Samarbejde i Norden (SSN)) in 1940 and increasingly sought international cooperation in developing nursing standards. Between April and May 1945, Broe worked at the Padborg Quarantine Station set up by the Danish Red Cross. The rescue mission was an evacuation of sick prisoners from the Neuengamme concentration camp in Germany to Denmark. After arriving at one of three quarantine stations, the prisoners were bathed, fed, hydrated and given basic medical aid. After a night of stabilization, all evacuees proceed to Sweden where their care continued until Germany‘s unconditional surrender. In 1947, Broe joined the International Council of Nurses (ICN) and took a leave to study abroad, first at Columbia's Teachers College again and then at the University of Toronto. She went abroad again to study in 1950 at the University of Chicago.

In 1951, Broe was appointed as director of the ICN's Education Department at the Florence Nightingale International Foundation (FNIF) of London. Under her direction, the FNIF prepared reports on the range of nursing education at various levels. She visited numerous countries to study their systems and provided advice to enhance their training of nurses, as well as participating in negotiations with authorities. Her travels led her to Australia, India, Jordan, Lebanon, Myanmar, New Zealand, Pakistan and several European countries. She spearheaded planning and led two international conferences in nursing research: the Sèvres, France, conference of 1956 and the New Delhi, India, conference in 1960. The goal of her work was to guide international nursing organizations to enhance training and education, especially in developing nations. Her work was recognized when she was honored with the Florence Nightingale Medal in 1961.

In 1962, Broe resigned from the ICN and returned to Denmark for a rest. Beginning in 1963, she became a nursing consultant for the Danish Red Cross and led an effort to recruit staff for a Danish hospital which was being built in Zaire. She retired in 1971 and received the Pro Humanitate Medal from the organization. In her retirement, Broe helped found the Senior Association for Nurses, which joined the DSR in 1982.

== Legacy and death ==
Broe died on 1 September 1994 at the Liobasøstrenes Nursing Home in Copenhagen. In addition to publishing a large number of articles in both Danish and international journals on nursing education and research, Broe wrote a textbook on Nursing History and its development.

== Publications ==
In addition to numerous contributions to journals and other works, Broe published two books:

- Broe, Ellen (1958). Medicinens historie (in Danish). Nyt Nordisk Forlag.
- Broe, Ellen (1960). Sygeplejens historie og fortsatte udvikling (in Danish). Nyt Nordisk Forlag.
