= Charlotte Munck =

Charlotte Munck may refer to:

- Charlotte Munck (nurse) (1876–1932), Danish nurse
- Charlotte Munck (actress) (born 1969), Danish actress
