= Orders, decorations, and medals of Denmark =

Coat of arms of Denmark

The award system of Denmark, and especially the regulations for who is allowed to wear which medals, is one of great variation. The current honour-system has been created one step at a time since the 16th century. The system consists of royal orders and medals, official/governmental medals and some few private medals that have been approved by the monarch.

== Orders of chivalry ==
=== Order of the Elephant ===
Ribbon	Name (English/Danish)	Post-nominal abbreviation	Date of creation Date of approval	Award Criteria
	Order of the Elephant; Elefantordenen	R.E.	Early 16th century Current form 1693; Statutes changed 1958	Awarded to members of the royal family and to major heads of state.

=== Order of the Dannebrog ===
Ribbon	Name (English/Danish)	Post-nominal abbreviation	Date of creation Date of approval	Award Criteria
	Grand Commander	S.Kmd.	1671	Awarded to 8 members of the Danish royal family or royals with a close connection to the family.
	Grand Cross	S.K.	1671	Awarded to Danish admirals, generals, supreme-court judges, ambassadors, and similar as a reward for very meritorious service and awarded to foreign ambassadors after three years of service if their country gives orders to foreign diplomats.
	Commander 1st Degree	K1	1671	Awarded to Danish admirals, generals, supreme-court judges, ambassadors, and other governmental leaders as a retirement decoration and awarded to foreign chargés d affairs after three years of service if their country gives orders to foreign diplomats.
	Commander	K	1671	
	Knight 1st Degree	R1	1671	
	Knight	R	1671	
	Cross of Honour of the Order of the Dannebrog; Dannebrogordenens Hæderstegn	D.Ht	1808	Awarded to Danish members of the Order of Dannebrog who have made themselves worthy of an extra decoration for either merits or life saving.

== Medals ==
=== Civil medals ===
Ribbon	Name (English/Danish)	Post-nominal abbreviation	Date of creation Date of approval	Award Criteria
	Medal of Merit in Gold with Crown; Fortjenstmedaljen i Guld med Krone	F.M.1*	16 May 1792	This medal has no official statutes and may be awarded by the reigning monarch as seen fit.
	Medal of Merit in Gold; Fortjenstmedaljen i Guld	F.M.1	16 May 1792	This medal has no official statutes and may be awarded by the reigning monarch as seen fit.
	Medal of Merit in Silver with clasp Fortjenstmedaljen i Sølv med spænde	F.M.2.M.SPÆNDE	16 May 1792	This medal has no official statutes and may be awarded by the reigning monarch as seen fit.
	Medal of Merit in Silver; Fortjenstmedaljen i Sølv	F.M.2	16 May 1792	This medal has no official statutes and may be awarded by the reigning monarch as seen fit.
	Ingenio et Arti; Ingenio et Arti	M.i.&a.	31 August 1841	Awarded to artists (musicians, painters, actors and scientists) who have done extremely noteworthy work.
	Royal Medal of Recompense in Gold with Crown; Den Kongelige Belønningsmedalje i Guld med Krone	B.M.1*	4 September 1865	This medal has no official statutes and may be awarded by the reigning monarch as seen fit.
	Royal Medal of Recompense in Gold; Den Kongelige Belønningsmedalje i Guld	B.M.1	4 September 1865	This medal has no official statutes and may be awarded by the reigning monarch as seen fit.
	Royal Medal of Recompense in Silver with Crown; Den Kongelige Belønningsmedalje i Sølv med Krone	B.M.2*	4 September 1865	This medal has no official statutes and may be awarded by the reigning monarch as seen fit.
	Royal Medal of Recompense in Silver; Den Kongelige Belønningsmedalje i Sølv	B.M.2	4 September 1865	This medal has no official statutes and may be awarded by the reigning monarch as seen fit.
	Medal for Noble Deeds; Medaljen for Ædel Dåd	M.f.æ.D.	12 June 1793	Awarded for life saving deeds, where the rescuer has put his own life at great risk in order to save another persons life.
	Minister of Justice's Medal; Justitsministerens Medalje	Jm.M.	12 April 2019	Awarded to Danes as well as foreigners who have made a particularly fearless and / or appreciative effort.
	Ministry of Justice Medal for Fallen in Service; Justitsministeriets Medalje for Omkommet i Tjeneste	Jum.M.F.	12 April 2019	Awarded to employees in the Ministry of Justice who have died as a result of a criminal offense in connection with the service.
	Ministry of Justice Medal for Wounded in Service; Justitsministeriets Medalje for Sårede i Tjeneste	Jum.M.S.	12 April 2019	Awarded to employees of the Ministry of Justice who have been seriously injured physically or mentally as a result of an offense in connection with the service.
	Ministry of Justice Medal for International Service; Justitsministeriets Medalje for International Indsats	Jum. M.I.T.	12 April 2019	Awarded to ministry staff, including police officers, who have made a deserving international effort.
	Danish Tourism Board Medal of Honor; Danmarks Turistråds Hæderstegn	D.T.H.	26 February 1963; 8 March 1963	Awarded to persons who have done a special effort to promote Danish tourism. Maximum 5 medals may be awarded each year, and only 2 of these may be awarded to Danes.
	Medal of Merit of the Greenlandic Home-Rule; Grønlands Hjemmestyres Fortjenstmedalje (Greenlandic: Nersonaat)	Grøn.Hjst.M.	1 May 1989	Awarded in gold or silver for meritious service for Greenland in fields such as public service, business, art or science.

=== Uniformed Service decorations ===
Ribbon	Name (English/Danish)	Post-nominal abbreviation	Date of creation Date of approval	Award Criteria
	Valour Cross; Tapperhedskorset	Fsv.TK.	14 November 2011	Highest award for bravery, comparable to the Victoria Cross or Medal of Honor.
	Defence Medal for Bravery; Forsvarets Medalje for Tapperhed	Fsv.M.T.	30 October 1995	Awarded to military and civilian personnel of the defence who, during combat or terrorist attack, have done heroic deeds.
	Defence Medal for Excellent Service; Forsvarets Medalje for Fremragende Tjeneste	Fsv.M.F.T.	7 December 2009	Awarded for extraordinary service to the Danish Defence.
	Distinguished Flying Medal; Medaljen for Udmærket Lufttjeneste	M.f.u.Lt.	30 May 1962	Awarded to pilots and crewmembers who, over a longer period of time have been an excellent role model for others, or for very exceptional and dangerous rescue operations of persons or material, done without taking unnecessary risk.
	Defence Medal for Fallen in Service; Forsvarets medalje for Faldne i Tjeneste	Fsv.M.F.	1 January 2010	Awarded to personnel killed in the line of duty, as a result from "acts of weaponry", including mines used in combat or during terrorist attacks.
	Defence Medal for Wounded in Service; Forsvarets medalje for Sårede i Tjeneste	Fsv.M.S.	1 January 2010	Awarded to personnel wounded in the line of duty, as a result from "acts of weaponry", including mines used in combat or during terrorist attacks.
	Navy Long Service Medal; Hæderstegn for God Tjeneste ved Søetaten	Ht.S.	29 January 1801	Awarded to personnel in the Danish Navy for 25 and 40 years of nonstop consecutive service.
	Army Long Service Medal; Hæderstegn for God Tjeneste ved Hæren	Ht.H.	26 September 1945	Awarded to personnel in the Danish Army for 25 and 40 years of nonstop consecutive service.
	Air Force Long Service Medal; Hæderstegn for God Tjeneste ved Flyvevåbnet	Ht.F.	11 March 1953	Awarded to personnel in the Danish Air Force for 25 and 40 years of nonstop consecutive service.
	Armed Forces Long Service Medal; Hæderstegn for God Tjeneste	F.Ht.	11 March 1953	Awarded to personnel in the Danish Armed Forces, who are not eligible for the branch-specific medals, for 25 and 40 years of nonstop consecutive service.
	Reserve Long Service Medal; Hæderstegn for God Tjeneste i Forsvarets Reserve	Ft.Fsv.R.	16 April 1978	Awarded to personnel in the Danish Armed Forces Reserve after 25 years of service.
	Medal of the Minister of Defence; Forsvarsministerens Medalje	Fm.M.	7 December 2009	Awarded by the Minister of Defence to whomever is seen fit. Awarded for meritorious non-combat deeds, heroism outside of combat and personnel killed in action outside of combat.
	Medal of the Minister of Defence for Noteworthy Deeds; Forsvarsministerens Medalje for Særlig Indsats		7 January 2022	Awarded by the Minister of Defence to whomever is seen fit.
	Defence Medal for Meritorious Service; Forsvarets Medalje for Fortjenstfuld Indsats	Fsv.M.3.	27 November 1991; 1 January 2010	Originally awarded for meritorious deployment outside of Denmark. After 2010 awarded to civilians or military personnel who have done meritorious service to the better of the Danish Defence.
	Defence Medal for International Service, Single Deployment; Forsvarets Medalje for International Tjeneste, Enkeltmandsudsendelse	Fsv.M.I.T.		Awarded for international deployment alone
	Defence Medal for International Service, Afghanistan; Forsvarets Medalje for International Tjeneste, Afghanistan	Fsv.M.I.T.	1 January 2010	Awarded for international deployment with the Danish Armed forces in Afghanistan (ISAF or similar)
	Defence Medal for International Service, Kosovo; Forsvarets Medalje for International Tjeneste, Kosovo	Fsv.M.I.T.	1 January 2010	Awarded for international deployment with the Danish Armed forces in Kosovo (KFOR or similar)
	Defence Medal for International Service, Lebanon; Forsvarets Medalje for International Tjeneste, Libanon	Fsv.M.I.T.	1 January 2010	Awarded for international deployment with the Danish Armed forces in Lebanon (UNIFIL or similar)
	Defence Medal for International Service, Gulf of Aden; Forsvarets Medalje for International Tjeneste, Adenbugten	Fsv.M.I.T.		Awarded for international deployment with the Danish Armed forces in the Gulf of Aden (OOS)
	Defence Medal for International Service, Syria; Forsvarets Medalje for International Tjeneste, Middelhavet	Fsv.M.I.T.		Awarded for participation in Removal of chemical weapons from Syria (RECSYR)
	Defence Medal for International Service 1948-2009; Forsvarets Medalje for International Tjeneste 1948-2009	Fsv.M.I.T. 48-09.	2015	Awarded for international deployment with the Danish Armed forces any time between 1948 and 2009
	Homeguard Medal of Merit; Hjemmeværnets Fortjensttegn	Hjv.Ft.	11 February 1959	Awarded to personnel who have made a special contribution to the Danish Homeguard, normally awarded to Company Commanders, Politicians and similar.
	Homeguard 25 Years Service Decoration; Hjemmeværnets 25 års-tegn Homeguard 40 Years Service Decoration; Hjemmeværnets 40 års-tegn Homeguard 50 Years Service Decoration; Hjemmeværnets 50 års-tegn Homeguard 60 Years Service Decoration; Hjemmeværnets 60 års-tegn	Hjv.25. Hjv.40. Hjv.50. Hjv.60.	25 November 1973 6 September 1988 12 April 2000 12 June 2009	Awarded to personnel of the Danish Homeguard after 25, 40, 50 and 60 years of service.
	Civil Defence Long Service Medal; Hæderstegnet for 25 års god tjeneste i Civilforsvaret	H.T.C.F	25 April 1963	Awarded for 25 years of meritorious service in the Civil Defence
	Badge of Honor of the League of Civil Defence; Beredskabsforbundets Hæderstegn	B.F.Ht.	9 November 1956	Awarded for noteworthy work for the Civil Defence cause in Denmark, over a prolonged period of time (15 years). Normally awarded to Civil Defence leaders, fire chiefs, politicians and similar persons.
	Rescue Preparedness Medal; Redningsberedskabets Medalje	R.B	20 April 1994	Awarded for participation in humanitarian international operations outside the borders of Denmark
	Fire Department Long Service Medal; Hæderstegn for God Tjeneste i Brandvæsnet	Ht.g.T.B.	5 December 1973	Awarded for 25 years of meritorious service in the municipal fire services
	Police Long Service Medal; Hæderstegn for God Tjeneste i Politiet	Ht.P	18 June 1959	Awarded for 25 years of meritorious service in the Danish police
	Badge of Honor of the Reserve Officers Association of Denmark; Reserveofficersforeningen i Danmarks Hæderstegn	R.O.Ht.	27 April 1950	Awarded by the Danish Reserve Officers Association to whomever they find are in need of honors. Normally only awarded in 2-3 specimens a year
	Medal of Honor of the Chamber of Danish Handicraft; Håndværksrådets Hæderstegn	H.Ht.	19 February 1965; 6 March 1965	Awarded in silver for 10 years in a leading position in a handicraft-union or similar. Gold awarded after 25 years.
	Badge of Honor of the Society of Danish Military Athletics; Dansk Militært Idrætsforbunds Hæderstegn	D.M.If.Ht.	23 November 1968; 5 September 1967	Awarded to persons who have done a special effort to promote the voluntary athletics in the Danish Military.
	Danish Red Cross Badge of Honor; Dansk Røde Kors Hæderstegn	D.r.K.Ht.	19 February 1916	Awarded for special, and normally prolonged, service to the Danish Red Cross. To be awarded the Badge of Honor, one must already have the Badge of Merit 1st Class.
	Danish Red Cross Medal for Merit; Dansk Røde Kors Fortjensttegn	D.r.K.Ft. D.r.K.Ft.I.	28 March 1963	Awarded to persons in volunteer leading positions in the Red Cross. 2nd class typically awarded after 4–6 years as a member of central board, 8–10 years as a section-manager or equal, or after 12–15 years as a member of a local board or equal. 1st class typically awarded after 6–10 years work, after being awarded the 2nd class medal.
	Danish Blue Berets Peace Prize Medal; De Blå Baretters Fredsprismedalje	F.P.M	1995	Commemorative medal, celebrating the Nobel Peace Prize to UN forces. May be awarded to all veterans of international UN operations. Personnel who have been deployed with the UN before 1988 (Noble Peace Prize) may attach a silver laurel branch to the ribbon of the medal.

=== Commemorative medals ===
Ribbon	Name (English/Danish)	Post-nominal abbreviation	Date of creation Date of approval	Award Criteria
	Commemorative Medal for the Golden Wedding of King Christian IX and Queen Louise; Erindringstegnet i anledning af Kong Christian IX og Dronning Louises Guldbryllup	Gb.E.T.	26 May 1892	Awarded to those related to the Royal Court at the day of Golden Wedding; family members, employees and others.
	King Christian IX Memorial Medal; Kong Christian den Niendes Mindemedalje	C.IX.M.M.	13 February 1906	The medal was awarded to those guardsmen who had been on guard when the King died on January 29, 1906.
	King Frederik VIII Memorial Medal; Kong Frederik den Ottendes Mindemedalje	Fr.VIII.M.M.	10 July 1912	Awarded to military personnel who helped in the transportation of the King's remains and who stood guard at the King's funeral.
	King Christian X Military Commemorative Medal; Kong Christian den Tiendes Militære Erindringsmedaille		5 May 1914	King Christian X (then Prince) was the first royal person to undergo basic military training together with a normal team of conscripts. The prince himself had gone to the King (his grandfather, Christian IX), and asked to undergo normal military training without any special regards to his royal background. On the 25th anniversary of his entry into the military, he held a celebration and this medal was given to all his old army comrades.
	Commemorative Medal of the Royal Mounted Guardsmen; Hestgardens Erindringsmedalje		31 May 1916	Awarded to a total of 51 persons on the 50th anniversary of the repeal of the Mounted Guardsmen.
	King Christian X Commemorative Medal of the Cavalry Second Lieutenant-, Sergeant, and Corporal Academy; Christian den Niendes Erindringsmedaille fra Rytteriets Sekondløjtnant-, Sergent-, og Korporalskole		4 November 1926	Awarded on the 25th anniversary of the King's enrollment to the school, to 38 of the Kings old classmates, at a private party held by the King.
	Commemotative Medal for the 25th Anniversary of King Christian X's Matriculation from the Military Academy; Kong Christian den Tiendes Erindringstegn fra Officersskolen		20 March 1916	Awarded to the military comrades of King Christian on the 25th anniversary of the matriculation from the Military Officers Academy.
	Medal for the 100th Anniversary of the Birth of King Christian IX; Mindemedaillen i Anledning af Hundredeårsdagen for Kong Christian den Niendes Fødsel		11 March 1918	Awarded to members of the royal house and to personal servants of King Christian IX. Awarded to 43 members of the royal family and 172 servants.
	Medal of the 50th anniversary of King Christian X's Matriculation from the Military Academy; Kong Christian den Tiendes Erindringsmedaille til Minde om 50-års dagen for Hans Majestæts Afgang fra Officersskolen		20 March 1941	Awarded to the military comrades of King Christian on the 50th anniversary of the matriculation from the Military Officers' Academy.
	Medal for the 100th Anniversary of the Birth of King Frederik VIII; Mindemedaillen i Anledning af Hundredeårsdagen for Kong Frederik den Ottendes Fødsel	M.M.3.juni; 1843-1943	29 April 1943	Awarded to members of the royal house and to personal servants of King Frederik VIII. Awarded to 23 members of the royal family and 79 servants.
	King Christian X Memorial Medal; Kong Christian den Tiendes Mindemedaille		26 September 1947	Awarded to military personnel who helped in the transportation of the King's remains and who stood guard at the King's funeral, and to those Royal Guardsmen who stood guard when the King died.
	Medal for the 100th Anniversary of the Birth of King Christian X Mindemedaillen i Anledning af Hundredeårsdagen for Kong Christian den Tiendes Fødsel	M.M.26.sept. 1870-1970	9 September 1970	Awarded to only the 12 closest family members of the deceased King.
	King Frederik IX Memorial Medal; Kong Frederik den Niendes Mindemedaille	Fr.IX.M.M.	30 June 1972	Awarded to military personnel who helped in the transportation of the King's remains and who stood guard at the King's funeral, and to those Royal Guardsmen who stood guard when the King died, and a few others with special merits to the King.
	Commemorative Medal for the 50th Anniversary of Queen Ingrid's Arrival to Denmark; Erindringsmedaillen i Anledning af 50-års-dagen for Hendes Majestæt Dronning Ingrids Ankomst til Danmark	Dr.I.E.M.	15 May 1985	Awarded to 15 members of the Royal House and 35 employees of the Queen's Court.
	Commemorative Medal on the Occasion of the 50th Birthday of Her Majesty Queen Margrethe; Erindringsmedalje i Anledningen af Hendes Majestæt Dronningens 50-års Fødselsdag	EM.16.apr.1990	6 April 1990	Awarded to persons outside the Royal Court who had given special services to the Queen.
	Commemorative Medal on the Occasion of the Silver Wedding of Her Majesty the Queen and His Royal Highness the Prince Consort; Erindringsmedaljen i anledning af Hendes Majestæt Dronning Margrethe og Hans Kongelige Højhed Prins Henriks sølvbryllup	S.E.m.	10 June 1992	Awarded to those related to the Royal Court on the Silver Wedding anniversary of the Queen and the Prince Consort; family members, employees and others.
	Commemorative Medal for the Silver Jubilee of Queen Margarethe of Denmark; Erindringsmedaljen i anledning af H.M. Dronning Margrethes II´s 25-års regeringsjubilæum	R.E.m.	14 January 1997	Awarded to those related to the Royal Court on Queen Margarethe's Silver Jubilee; family members, employees and others.
	Medal for the 100th Anniversary of the Birth of King Frederik IX; Mindemedaillen i Anledning af Hundredeårsdagen for Kong Frederik den Niendes Fødsel	M.M.11.marts; 1899-1999	8 March 1999	Awarded to members of the royal house and to personal servants of King Frederik IX. Awarded to 21 members of the royal family and 110 servants.
	Queen Ingrid Commemorative Medal; Dronning Ingrids Mindemedalje	Dr.I.M.M.	28 March 2001	Awarded to close relatives of Queen Ingrid, servants with special ties to the Queen, and to persons who helped with the funeral. 375 medals awarded in total.
	Prince Henriks 75th Birthday Medal; Medaljen for Prins Henriks 75-års Fødselsdag	Em.11.juni.2009	11 June 2009	Awarded to those related to the Royal Court on Prince Henrik's 75th birthday; family members, employees and others.
	Commemorative Medal on the Occasion of the 70th Birthday of Her Majesty Queen Margrethe; Erindringsmedalje i Anledningen af Hendes Majestæt Dronningens 70-års Fødselsdag	EM.16.apr.2010	16 April 2010	Awarded to those related to the Royal Court on Queen Margrethe's 70th birthday; family members, employees and others.
	Commemorative Medal for the Ruby Jubilee of Queen Margarethe of Denmark; Erindringsmedaille i anledning af Hendes Majestæt Dronningens 40 års regeringsjubilæum	R.40.Em.	14 January 2012	Awarded to those related to the Royal Court on Queen Margarethe's Ruby Jubilee; family members, employees and others.
	Commemorative Medal on the Occasion of the 75th Birthday of Her Majesty Queen Margrethe; Erindringsmedalje i Anledningen af Hendes Majestæt Dronningens 75-års Fødselsdag	EM.16.apr.2015	16 April 2015	Awarded to those related to the Royal Court on Queen Margrethe's 75th birthday; family members, employees and others.
	Commemorative Medal for the Golden Wedding of Her Majesty Queen Margrethe and His Royal Highness Prince Henrik; Erindringsmedaillen i anledning af Hendes Majestæt Dronning Margrethes og Hans Kongelige Højhed Prins Henriks guldbryllup	G.Em.	10 Juni 2017	Awarded to those related to the Royal Court at the day of Golden Wedding; family members and employees.
	Prince Henrik's Commemorative Medal; Prins Henriks Mindemedaille	Pr.H.Mm.	11 Juni 2018	Awarded for service in connection with the death and funeral of HKH Prince Henrik.
	Commemorative Medal on the Occasion of the 80th Birthday of Her Majesty Queen Margrethe; Erindringsmedalje i Anledningen af Hendes Majestæt Dronningens 80-års Fødselsdag	EM.16.apr.2020	16 April 2020	Awarded to those related to the Royal Court on Queen Margrethe's 80th birthday; family members, employees and others.
	Commemorative Medal in connection with the 50th anniversary of Her Majesty The Queen’s accession to the throne Erindringsmedaillen i anledning af Hendes Majestæt Dronningens 50-års regeringsjubilæum	R.50.Em.	14 January 2022	Awarded to those related to the Royal Court on Queen Margarethe's Golden Jubilee; family members, employees and others.

== Historic ==
=== Historic Orders ===
- Order of the Armed Arm 1616
- Order of the Perfect Union 1732 – 1770
- Order of Mathilde 1771 – 1772
- Order of Christian VII 1774 – 1800

=== Historic Medals ===
- King Christian X's Liberty Medal (1946)
- Royal Life Guards 350th anniversary commemorative medal (2008)
- Guard Hussar Regiment 400th anniversary commemorative medal (2014)
