= S!REN =

Emergency warning system

THE S!REN (Danish: S!RENEN) is the Danish mobile warning system which is a supplement to the warning sirens.

== Description ==
The implementation has taken place on the basis of an EU directive which obliges the EU member states to introduce a digital supplement to the existing warning channels.

The system came into effect in April 2023, and the first alarm occurred on 3 May 2023 at 12:00 PM as part of Denmark's annual test of the alert system.

The Siren is operated by the Danish Emergency Management Agency, but is connected to the existing warning system. That is why it is the police who send out alarms via the Siren.

It has been developed under the auspices of the Ministry of Defence, together with the Ministry of Justice and the Ministry of Climate, Energy and Utilities and their subordinate agencies.

== Technology ==
The Siren uses Cell Broadcast technology to broadcast alerts to newer smartphones. For iPhones, it will require that it is an iPhone 8 or later and that the phone is updated to iOS 16.4. For Android devices, it depends on the Android version and manufacturer.

=== First warning ===
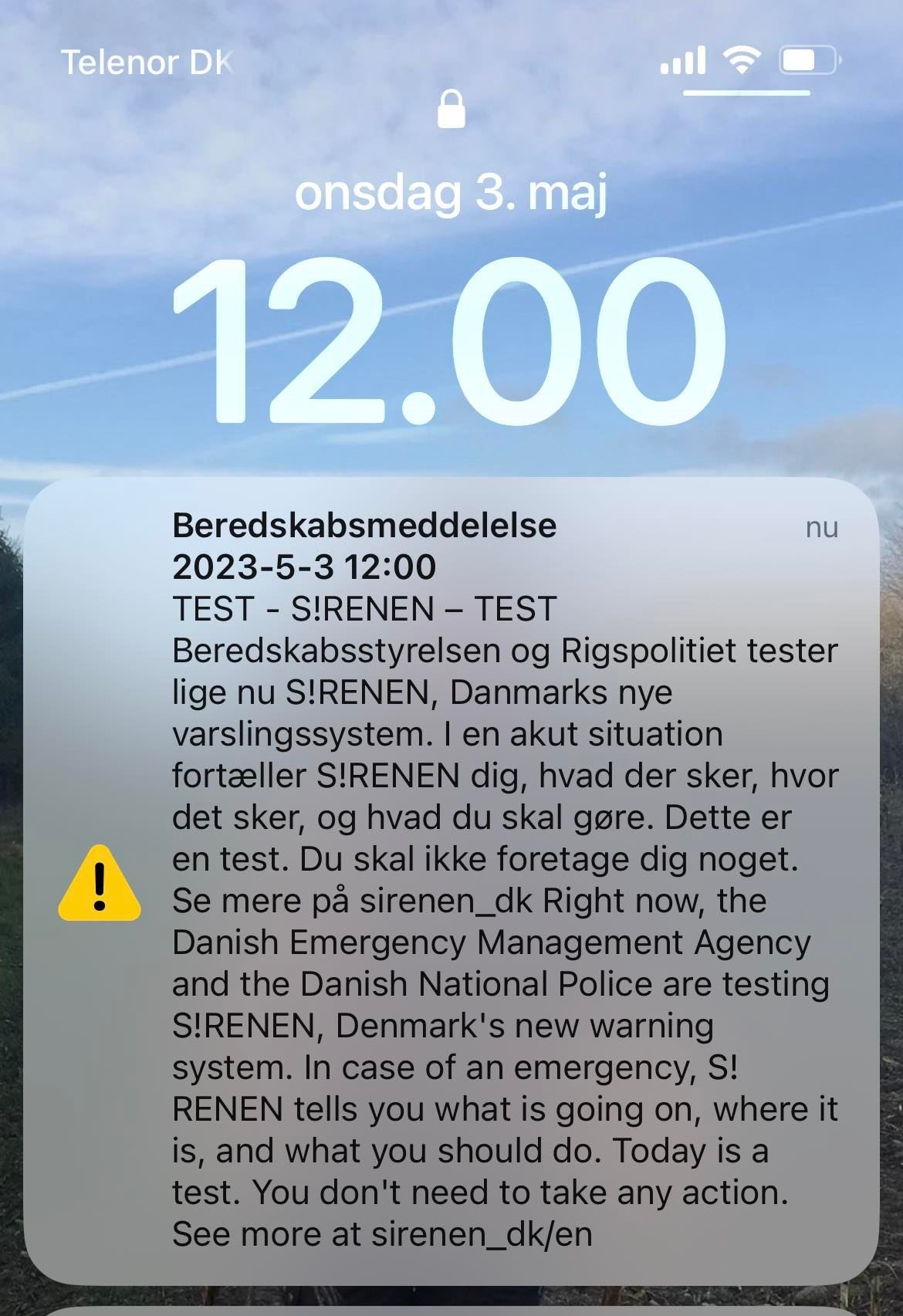
Screenshot of the first warning message on an iOS device.

3 May 2023 at 12:00 PM the first warning via the Siren was issued. The test warning stated the following:

TEST - S!RENEN – TEST

Beredskabsstyrelsen og Rigspolitiet tester lige nu S!RENEN, Danmarks nye varslingssystem. I en akut situation fortæller S!RENEN dig, hvad der sker, hvor det sker, og hvad du skal gøre.

Dette er en test. Du skal ikke foretage dig noget.

Se mere på sirenen_dk

Right now the Danish Emergency Management Agency and the Danish National Police are testing S!RENEN, Denmark's new warning system. In case of an emergency, S!RENEN tells you what is going on, where it is, and what you should do.

Today is a test. You don't need to take any action.

See more at sirenen_dk/en
