= Vammen =

- Village
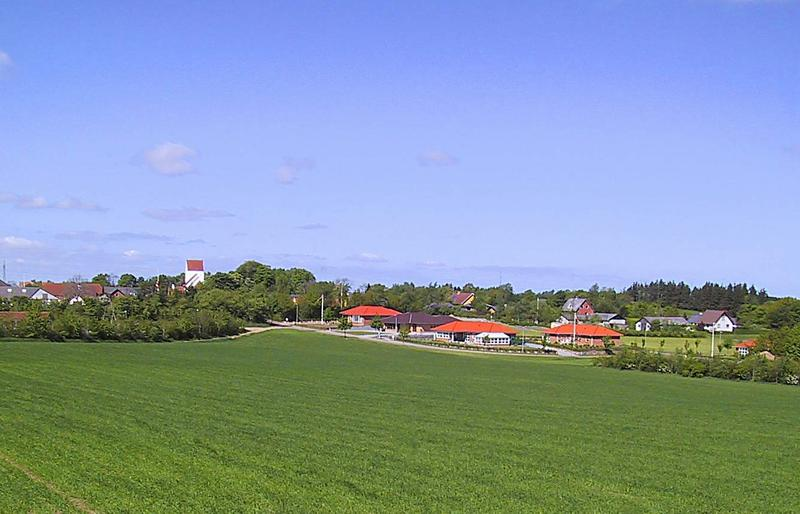
- Vammen, Denmark

- Location in Central Denmark Region Vammen (Denmark)
- Coordinates: 56°31′52″N 9°34′24″E
- Country: Denmark
- Region: Central Denmark Region
- Municipality: Viborg Municipality

Population (2026)
  - Total: 567

Vammen is a village in Viborg Municipality in central Jutland, Denmark. It is located 15 kilometres (9.3 mi) north-east of Viborg. Vammen Church, which still has its original walls, has a history going back to the Romanesque period. As of 1 January 2026, Vammen has a population of 567.

== Notable people ==
- Sophie Zahrtmann (1841 in Vammen – 1925) a Danish deaconess and nurse; became Sister Superior of the Danish Deaconess Institute
