= Zahrtmann =

Zahrtmann is a surname. Notable people with the surname include:

- Kristian Zahrtmann (1843–1917), Danish painter
- Sophie Zahrtmann (1841–1925), Danish deaconess and nurse
