= Sophie Zahrtmann =

Danish deaconess and nurse

Mette Sophie Zahrtmann (1841–1925) was a Danish deaconess and nurse. Zahrtmann became Sister Superior of the Danish Deaconess Institute in Copenhagen after the death of its founder Louise Conring in 1891. She is remembered for expanding the deaconess network in Denmark with additional homes and care centres and for adding theory to the training courses for nurses.

== Early life ==
Born on 23 July 1841 in Vammen to the north-west of Viborg, Zahrtmann was the daughter of Johan Henrich Zahrtmann and his wife Marie Dorothea Poulsen. She was one of seven children brought up in the rectory at Hatting near Horsens where her father was the parish priest. Like her cousin, the painter Kristian Zahrtmann, she was interested in art and took courses in drawing and painting.

In 1855, while her sister was undergoing an operation at Frederiks Hospital in Copenhagen, Søren Kierkegaard died at the hospital, awakening Zahrtmann's interest in the philosopher. She was also impressed by Ilia Fibiger, Denmark's first professional nurse, who worked at the hospital. After her mother died in 1858, Zahrtmann contemplated taking up a career but her father persuaded her to stay at home to take care of her younger sisters. The rectory suffered under the Danish War of 1864, causing Zahrtmann considerable distress from which she never fully recovered. Shortly before her father died in 1867, she received his permission to become a deaconess. First, however, she spent four years in Aarhus, caring for two blind children.

== Career ==
In 1872, Zahrtmann began her training at the Deaconess Institute in Strasbourg rather than at the one in Copenhagen as she thought she would find more understanding there for Denmark's loss in the war as Alsace had also been annexed to Germany in 1870. While abroad, she also worked for a period in a large hospital in Neuchâtel and spent some time in the Deaconess Institute in Paris. But she was attached above all to the mother house in Strasbourg where she was installed as a deaconess in 1877.

In 1879, she was assigned to Copenhagen's Deaconess Institute, where she played a central role in training its new sisters in nursing and Christian ethics. One of her important innovations was to introduce nursing theory as a component of the courses. She also emphasized the importance of a religious approach, drawing on her father's teaching. She became increasingly popular with her students and brought a more pleasant atmosphere to the institute. When Louise Corning died in 1891, Zahrtmann became Sister Superior, expanding the deaconess network throughout Denmark with additional branches and care centres. She also maintained contacts south of the Danish border in Schleswig-Holstein, often inviting Danish-speaking sisters to Denmark for free training. During her leadership, the number of sisters grew from 185 to 300. From 1903, she began systematically to improve the training courses in nursing, appointing Ingeborg Schrøder as head of training. By 1913, the training courses had been largely formalized and lasted for two years, six months being devoted to theory alone.

When she retired in 1914, she moved to the deaconess home in Gentofte, fully avoiding any interference with her successor Victoria Jensen. While a pensioner, she wrote a number of articles on Louise Conring as well as her own memoirs; both were later published in Den danske Diakonissestiftelses Årbog.

She died on 4 May 1925 in the Copenhagen district of Frederiksberg and is buried in Solbjerg Park Cemetery.
