= Peace Prize Medal (Denmark) =

The Blue Berets Denmark Peace Prize Medal
- The medal for participation in UN missions before and after 1988
- Type: Medal
- Awarded for: Participation in UN missions
- Country: Denmark
- Presented by: The Danish Blue Berets
- Eligibility: Former UN soldiers who have received a UN medal
- Post-nominals: F.P.M
- Campaign: Any UN
- Status: Active
- Established: 12 June 1995
- Ribbon of the medal

Precedence
- Next (higher): Danish Red Cross Medal for Merit
- Next (lower): -

The Peace Prize Medal (Danish: De Blå Beretters Fredsprismedalje) was instituted in 1995 by Queen Margrethe II and may be awarded to any Dane who has completed a tour of duty on a UN mission and has received a medal for it. UN veterans are allowed to apply for the medal themselves thus making this the only Danish medal that the recipient himself can apply for.

The medal commemorates the 1988 Nobel Peace Prize given to United Nations Department of Peacekeeping Operations personnel. Persons who have been deployed with the UN before 1988 may attach a silver laurel branch to the ribbon of the medal.

== See also ==
- List of orders, decorations, and medals of the Kingdom of Denmark
- Peacekeeping
- United Nations Medal
- Canadian Peacekeeping Service Medal
