= Magdalene Lauridsen =

Danish headmistress and school founder

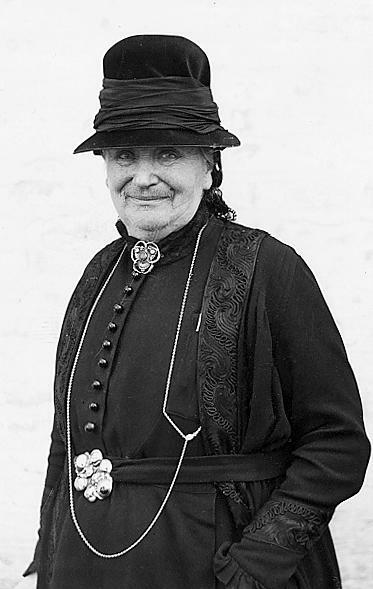
- Lauridsen in 1933
- Born: 25 April 1873; Holsted, Denmark
- Died: 5 July 1957 (aged 84); Copenhagen, Denmark
- Education: Askov Højskole
- Occupations: Schoolteacher and headmistress
- Spouse: Peter Dam (m.1911)
- Children: 1
- Honours: Danish Medal of Merit (1933); Grand Knight, Order of the Falcon (1950)

Magdalene Lauridsen (25 April 1873, Holsted—5 July 1957, Copenhagen) was a Danish schoolteacher and headmistress. In 1895, she founded Sorø Husholdningsskole, Denmark's first home economics school, followed in 1902 by Ankerhus Seminarium, the country's first teacher training college to specialize in home economics and housekeeping. Lauridsen also fought for rights for women, including the right to vote, and stressed the importance of fruit and vegetable farming for rural households. Active in organizational work, in 1906 she founded and chaired Foreningen af Husholdningslærerinder og -lærere (FHL), an association for home economics teachers, and in 1909 brought together delegates from the Nordic countries to the first collaborative meeting on household interests. In 1919, she converted Ankerhus Seminarium into an independent institution but continued to run the college until her retirement in 1943.

== Early life, education and family ==
Born on 25 April 1873 in Holsted, Southern Jutland, Magdalene Lauridsen was the eldest daughter of the farmer Anders Lauridsen (1843–1922) and his wife Mette Marie née Eskildsen (1848–1913). She was one of the family's eight children. Raised in the countryside, she became familiar with tasks in rural households. In addition to attending the local school. she and her siblings were educated at home where their father and her aunt Maren, a qualified teacher, tutored them. In 1892, she was a summer student at Askov Højskole where she participated in Jenny la Cour's textile courses. She also attended the Sorø Folk High School. In July 1911, she married the teacher training college principal Peter Dam (1853–1918) with whom she had already had a child, Margaret (1900).

== Career ==
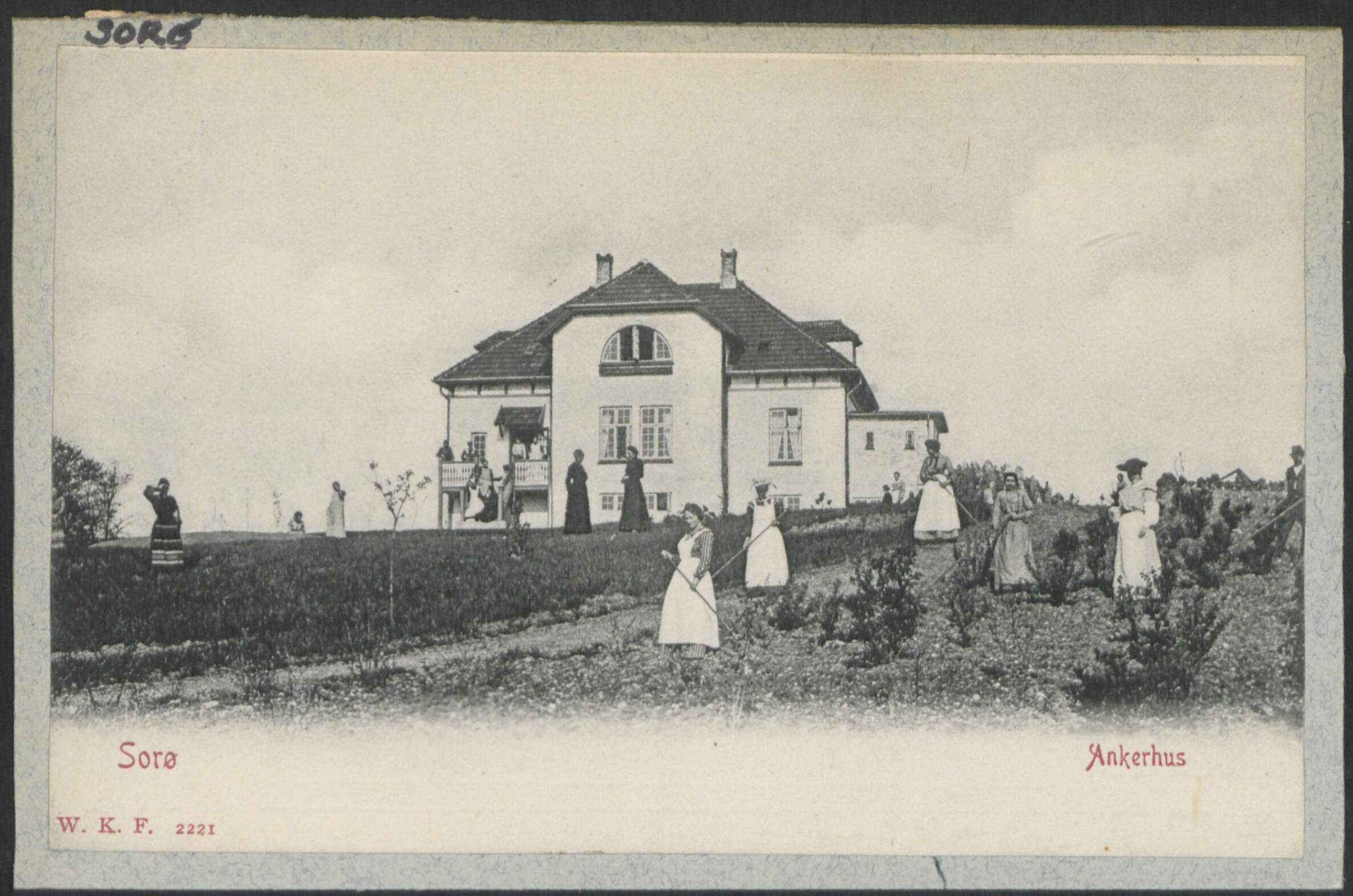
Ankerhus, Sorø.

While at Sorø Højskole, Lauridsen met the matron Jutta Bojsen-Møller, who in 1894 became chair of the Danish Women's Society, which among other things was interested in improving the education of young women in domestic tasks. This inspired her to create a housekeeping school in Sorø which opened in 1895 in rented premises. Together with the cook Eline Friksen as co-principal, she applied for state funding which led to an annual grant. Possibly with funding from her paternal uncle who was a successful businessman, in 1897 they moved into a new premises. The curriculum included home economics, health, accounting, sewing and weaving. Most of the students came from farming families.

In 1899, Lauridsen received a travel grant to study how adults were taught housework in England. This included itinerant evening courses from village to village targeted at young women. She also made inspiring study trips to Sweden, Norway, Germany and Austria. Back in Denmark, she introduced itinerant courses which proved so successful that the authorities encouraged her to found a teacher training college. This led in 1902 to the Ankerhus Seminarium which specialized in educating home economics teachers. In addition to running the school, Lauridsen created a large vegetable garden. In 1919, she converted Ankerhus Seminarium into an independent institution but continued to run the college until her retirement in 1943.

Lauridsen also fought for rights for women, including the right to vote, and stressed the importance of fruit and vegetable farming for rural households. Active in organizational work, in 1906 she founded and chaired Foreningen af Husholdningslærerinder og -lærere (FHL), an association for home economics teachers, and in 1909 brought together delegates from the Nordic countries to the first collaborative meeting on household interests.

Magdalene Lauridsen died in Copenhagen on 5 July 1957.

== Awards ==
In 1933, Lauridsen was honoured with the Danish Medal of Merit (gold}. In 1950, she became a Grand Knight of the Icelandic Order of the Falcon.
