= Medal of Merit (Denmark) =

Medal of Merit Fortjenstmedaljen
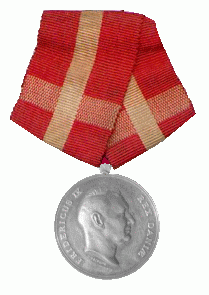
- Silver Medal of Merit
- Type: Award medal
- Country: Denmark
- Presented by: Frederik X
- Post-nominals: F.M.1* (Medal of Merit in Gold with Crown); F.M.1 (Medal of Merit in Gold); F.M.2.M.SPÆNDE (Medal of Merit in Silver with Clasp); F.M.2 (Medal of Merit in Silver)
- Established: 16 May 1792
- Ribbon bar of the medal

Precedence
- Next (higher): Cross of Honour of the Order of the Dannebrog (Gold Medal); Medal of Recompense in Gold (Silver Medal)
- Next (lower): Ingenio et Arti (Gold Medal); Medal of Recompense in Silver with Crown (Silver Medal)

The Medal of Merit (Danish: Fortjenstmedaljen) is the oldest extant award medal presented by the Kingdom of Denmark. Established by Christian VII on 16 May 1792, and re-instituted by ordinance of Christian VIII on 24 July 1845, it is a personal award of the Sovereign.

== Appearance ==
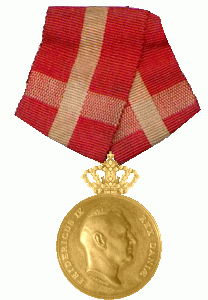
Gold Medal of Merit with Crown

The medal, depending on the version, is made of either gold or silver. The obverse bears the effigy, in profile, of The Queen and the inscription, Margareta II – Regina Daniæ. The reverse bears the single word Fortient, surrounded by an oak leaf wreath. The recipient’s name is engraved on the edge of the medal. This indicates that it is the personal property of the recipient, and is not returned upon death, like the badges of some orders of chivalry. The medal is suspended by a red ribbon with a white cross.

== Recipients ==
This is an alphabetical selection of recipients with articles in English.

- Achton Friis, painter
- Anders Fogh Rasmussen, politician
- Camilla Nielsen, philanthropist
- Charlotte Munck (1932), nurse and educator
- Christian Keller, physician
- Enrico Dalgas, engineer
- Frederik X, Danish king
- Fridtjof Nansen, Nobel Peace Prize laureate
- Ingrid Jespersen, educator
- Jutta Bojsen-Møller, educator and women's rights activist
- Kay Larsen, Danish author and colonial historian
- Magdalene Lauridsen, educator
- Marie Kruse, educator
- Maurice Egan
- Oda Nielsen, actress
- Princess Benedikte of Denmark, member of the Danish royal family
- Rasmus Malling-Hansen, inventor
- Roald Amundsen, Norwegian explorer
- Samuel Margoshes, journalist, newspaper editor, activist
- Thora Fiedler, nurse, prosthetist and inventor

== See also ==
- List of orders, decorations, and medals of the Kingdom of Denmark
