= National Operative Staff (Denmark) =

The National Operative Staff (NOST) (Danish: National Operativ Stab (NOST)) is a collaboration at the highest level between authorities in Denmark, the Faroe Islands and Greenland. The staff's main task is to create an overview so that the government and other authorities have a sufficient basis for making decisions. The National Operative Staff is obliged to hold at least one alert exercise every six months. The Danish Resilience Agency coordinates the work.

NOST is activated, for example, by:

- major accidents
- disasters
- terrorist attacks
- cyber attacks
- state visits
- summits

NOST was established in 2005 by the government in connection with the tsunami in Thailand as part of the defense agreement 2005-09.

== Members ==
The permanent members of NOST are:

- Danish National Police
- Danish Security and Intelligence Service
- Danish Defence Command
- Danish Defence Intelligence Service
- Centre for Cyber Security
- Danish Emergency Management Agency
- Danish Health Authority
- Danish Civil Aviation and Railway Authority
- Danish Resilience Agency
- Ministry of Foreign Affairs

Other authorities are called in as needed. For example, the Danish Meteorological Institute is called in during storms.

== Activities ==
For example, NOST has been activated at the:

- 2009 United Nations Climate Change Conference
- Air travel disruption after the 2010 Eyjafjallajökull eruption
- 2015 Copenhagen shootings
- Tsunami in Greenland 2017
- Drought in the summer of 2018
- Great Belt Bridge rail accident in 2019
- COVID-19 pandemic in 2019 to 2022
- Landslide at Nordic Waste in 2021 to 2024
- Nord Stream pipelines sabotage in 2022
- Storm surge in 2023
- Breakdown of TDC Net's mobile network in 2024.
- Heavy rainfall in the summer of 2025.
- Drone activity over Copenhagen's, Aalborg's and other airports 2025.
- The Greenland crisis.
