= Valour Cross =

Denmark's highest military award

Valour Cross Tapperhedskorset
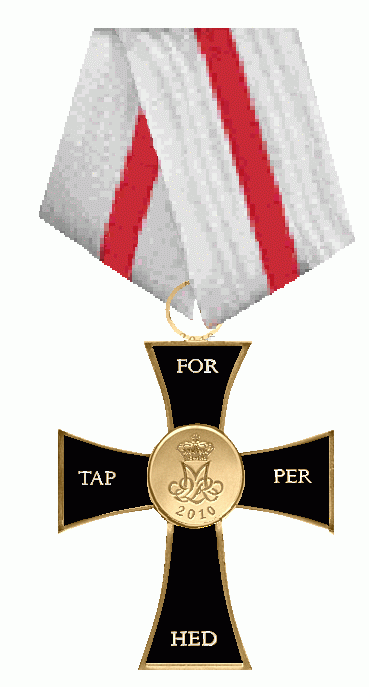
- Obverse of the Valour Cross
- Awarded for: Outstanding acts of courage in combat
- Description: Silver cross pattée with a gilded edge with gold medallion with monogram and 2010 superimposed
- Country: Denmark
- Presented by: the Monarch of Denmark
- Eligibility: Persons of any rank in the armed forces
- Post-nominals: T.K.
- Motto: For Tapperhed (in Danish); For Bravery (in English)
- Status: Currently awarded
- Established: 14 November 2011
- First award: 18 November 2011

Highlights
- Total: 1
- Ribbon bar of the Valour Cross

Precedence
- Next (higher): None
- Next (lower): Defence Medal for Bravery

The Valour Cross (Danish: Tapperhedskorset) is the highest military decoration of Denmark. Established on 14 November 2011, and first awarded on 18 November 2011, it is awarded for outstanding acts of courage in combat.

== Criteria ==
The Valour Cross is presented for extraordinary courage occurring during combat, where the soldier acted altruistically in an obviously dangerous situation. Efforts are aimed at promoting the solution of an important task or to save the lives of others. The Valour Cross is the highest Danish military decoration; it is comparable to the British Victoria Cross or the United States' Medal of Honor.

== Description ==
The Valour Cross decoration is a silver cross pattée with a gilded edge, the lower arm being longer than the others. On the obverse in the center of the cross is a gold medallion with HM The Queen's monogram above the year 2010. Each of the four arms of the cross bear three letters each of the inscription FOR TAPPERHED (meaning "for valour"). The reverse is engraved with the name and grade of the recipient, as well as the location and year of the event for which they were honoured.

The Valour Cross is suspended from a white ribbon with a red center stripe. When worn as a ribbon bar it is the same as the Defence Medal for Bravery but bears a miniature of the gold medallion from the center of the cross.

== Recipients ==
Since the creation of the Valour Cross, there has been only one recipient of the decoration. This first recipient is Sergeant Casper Westphalen Mathiesen of the Engineer Regiment, based in Skive, Denmark. On 19 February 2010, while deployed to Afghanistan with ISAF, Sergeant Mathiesen risked his own life and well being to defend a wounded comrade during a firefight. His bravery under fire is credited with holding off the enemy and allowing his comrade to receive medical assistance.

Name	Rank	Unit	Operation	Date of award	Reason awarded	Ref
Casper Westphalen Mathiesen (born 1985)	Sergeant	Engineer Regiment	ISAF	18 November 2011	On 19 February 2010, during fighting, unhesitatingly and clearly recognising the risk of his own life and limb, provided cover for a wounded comrade by standing between him and the enemy. He maintained this very vulnerable position and fired on the enemy so that additional help could arrive.	

== See also ==
- List of orders, decorations, and medals of the Kingdom of Denmark
