= Royal Medal of Recompense =

Royal Medal of Recompense Den Kongelige Belønningsmedalje
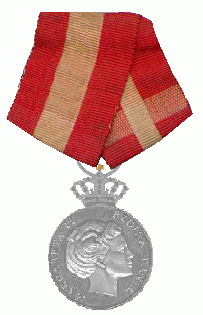
- Silver Medal of Recompense with Crown
- Type: Award medal
- Country: Denmark
- Presented by: Frederik X
- Post-nominals: B.M. 1* (Gold Medal with crown); B.M. 1 (Gold Medal); B.M.* (Silver Medal with crown); B.M. (Silver Medal)
- Established: 4 September 1865
- Ribbon bar of the medal

The Royal Medal of Recompense (Danish: Den Kongelige Belønningsmedalje) is a Danish medal. Established by King Christian IX the medal is presented at the prerogative of the Monarch. Currently, it is awarded for 40 or 50 years of service to the same private employer.

== History ==
The Royal Medal of Reward was established by an ordinance of King Christian IX on 4 September 1865. The statutes of the medal are renewed upon the accession of a new Danish monarch. The most current statutes were adopted 1 November 1972 with minor amendments made on 28 November 1986 and 25 January 1988.

== Appearance ==
The medal is produced by the Royal Mint of Denmark. The medal is round, 28 millimetres (1.1 in) in diameter. It is made of either gilded silver for (gold medals) or silver and is made with and without a crown surmounting the medal. On the obverse, it bears the effigy of Queen Margrethe II in profile. Surrounding the effigy is the inscription, Margareta II – Regina Daniæ. The reverse of the medal bears a wreath of oak leaves. Recipient’s names are engraved on the edge, indicating that the medal is the personal property of recipients, and does not have to be returned upon death, unlike the badges of orders. The medal is suspended from a red ribbon with a white cross.

== Criteria ==
The medal is awarded on the prerogative of the monarch and does not require prior recommendation from some public authority or source. Currently, the medal is primarily used to recognize those persons who have worked for the same private employer for 50 years, or for those who are no longer employed, but had at least 40 years of loyal service. The medal is abbreviated in the Court and State’s Calendar with the following postnominals:

- B.M. 1* Gold Medal with Crown
- B.M. 1 Gold Medal
- B.M. * Silver Medal with Crown
- B.M. Silver Medal.
