= Charlotte Munck (nurse) =

Danish nurse

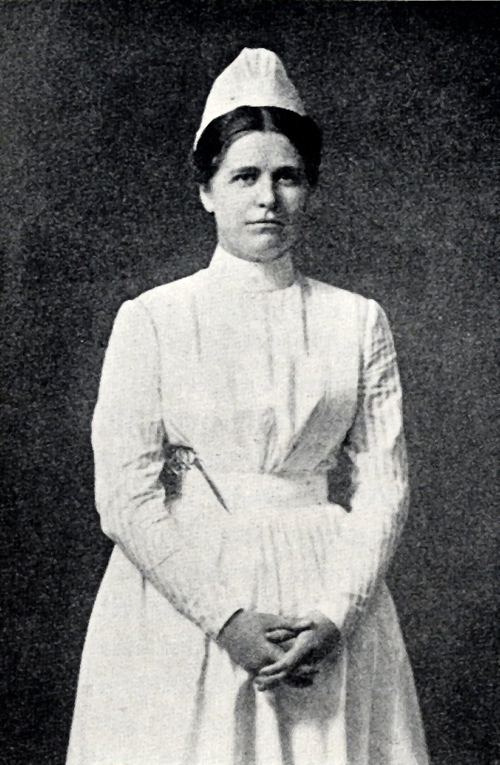
Charolotte Munck

Laura Charlotte Munck (1876–1932) was a pioneering Danish nurse who is remembered for her influential role in The Danish Nurses' Organization, a trade union, and for her contributions to nurses training in Denmark, especially the training programme she established at Bispebjerg Hospital in 1913.

== Early life ==
The youngest daughter of Frederik Vilhelm Munck, a parish priest, and his wife Marie Ludomilie Charlotte Fabricius, Munck was born in Lille Næstved just west of Næstved on 6 July 1876. She was raised with her six siblings in a comfortable Christian home, in which her father was not only the pastor at Herlufsholm School but was socially active, especially in the field of health insurance. In 1894, she travelled to Lausanne, Switzerland, where she studied languages at the École des jeunes filles.

== Involvement in nursing ==
Munck first spent a short period as a trainee at the Diakonissestiftelsen (Deaconess Institute), Copenhagen, in 1902 before returning home to help the family. In 1906, she went to New York, where she trained as a nurse at the Presbyterian Hospital under Anna Maxwell, one of the most important figures in American nursing. The course culminated with a diploma from Columbia University. After working as a nurse in casualty for a time, she returned to Denmark, where she obtained a post in the ear, nose and throat department at Rigshospitalet, Denmark's principal hospital. Thanks to her practical expertise and the assistance of colleagues such as Bodil Hellfach in the Nurses' Organization, in 1911 she was promoted to head nurse in dermatology. In parallel, she started to teach at the hospital's nursing school. When the Bisbebjerg Hospital was opened in 1913, Munch was appointed head of nurses training, a demanding position established along new lines proposed by the Nurses' Organization, based partly on the American system of combining theory with practice.

Munck devoted herself to nursing, taking on duties as a leader, instructor and writer while chairing various committees and associations. In collaboration with the surgeon Frode Rydgaard, she edited Lærebog og Haandbog i Sygepleje (Textbook and Handbook of Nursing), published in 1927 which became widely adopted over the next four years. Her own contribution on practical nursing became the normative text on nurses training. In particular, her approach emphasized the need for devotion and sacrifice and a desire to serve one's fellow men, while ensuring intelligence, memory and orderliness. When speaking on priorities in nursing, she often enlarged on ethics, including the need to adopt Christian principles such as compassion.

== Associations and committees ==
Munck was also active in a number of associations and committees. From 1910 to 1932, she headed the Kristelig Forening for Sygeplejersker (Christian Association for Nurses) and in 1922 she co-founded the Sygeplejerskernes Missionsforbund (Nurses Missionary Union). On the trades union front, she chaired the Sygeplejerskernes Samarbejde i Norden (Nurses Cooperation in the North), often speaking at its congresses. As a result of her experience in the United States, she developed a two-month training programme for nurses, addressing administration, instruction and social work. It was adopted by the Danish Nurses' Organization in 1926, where she had been vice-president since 1924. From 1927 to her death in 1932, she headed the organization, constantly striving for improved training, reduced working hours, better pay and pensions. For a period (1924–27), she was a member of the International Advisory Committee on Nursing with the Paris-based Red Cross League.

Charlotte Munck died on 28 July 1932 in Copenhagen. She is buried in Hellerup Cemetery.

== Recognition ==
In 1932 Charlotte Munck was awarded the Medal of Merit (Denmark) in Gold by king Christian X of Denmark.

At a ceremony in May 2014 at Columbia University's School of Nursing, where Charlotte Munck had studied in 1909, New York's Danish Consul General Jarl Frijs-Madsen honoured her with the Distinguished Alumni Award for Lifetime Achievement: "Although it's been more than a century since Charlotte Munck studied right here at Columbia Nursing, her fundamental philosophy lives on in the Danish health care system today. We believe the best health care begins with the patient, and Munck's vision placed nurses at the forefront of creating a national system of patient-centred care."

== Publications ==
- Munck, Charlotte; Rydgaard, Frode (1927). Lærebog og Haandbog i Sygepleje (in Danish). Nyt Nordisk Forlag Arnold Busck.
