= Merry Elisabeth Scheel =

Danish nursing theorist and writer

Merry Elisabeth Scheel (26 September 1929, Aarhus - 2 November 2007) was one of Denmark's most prominent nursing theorists. She received several degrees in her life, including a nursing degree in 1960, and a PhD in 2003. For many years, she was an active writer, especially around the ethical and philosophical aspects of the nursing profession.
