= Bodil Hellfach =

Danish nurse

Bodil Cathrine Hansine Hellfach (1856–1941) was a pioneering Danish nurse who was vice-chair of the Danish Nurses' Organization from 1899 to 1907. She later represented the organization at meetings and congresses at home and abroad, establishing the reputation of early Danish nursing.

== Biography ==
Born in the village of Hyllinge, west of Næstved, on 21 October 1856, Hellfach was the daughter of Johannes Mikael Hellfach and his wife Birgitte Kirstine Bech. Her father owned Petersdal Estate near Sorø. When he died in 1886, she began to gain her living as a nurse, despite the fact that the profession was not yet recognized as suitable for women from the middle and upper classes.

She moved to Copenhagen to work as a nurse at the Municipal Hospital under Dorthea Secher (1849–1926) who been employed there since 1878. By 1892, thanks to Secher's instruction and support, she was appointed nursing supervisor with responsibilities for new apprentices. She actively represented her staff, pressing for improved training, including theory, which had not been included in her own training.

Hellfach was one of the leading proponents of the Danish Nurses' Organization (Dansk Sygeplejeråd, DSR) which was founded in 1899 to provide closer contacts between Danish nurses. She acted as deputy chair until 1907 during a difficult period when she was often required to sort out conflicts and rally support. From her contributions to the journal Tidsskrift for Sygepleje, published by the DSR, it can be seen that she always had a positive approach, ever ready to support the need for improvements in working conditions for nurses, even after her retirement in 1913. In later life, she became an active board member of DSR's recreational home in Vedbæk. By speaking at conferences and conventions, she became an effective communicator, enhancing respect for Danish nursing at home and abroad.

Bodil Hellfach died in Copenhagen on 26 August 1941.
