= Badge of Honor of the League of Civil Defense =

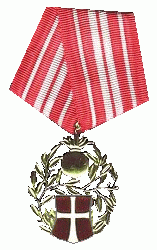
- Obverse of the medal
- Type: Medal of merit
- Awarded for: Noteworthy work for the Civil Defense cause
- Country: Denmark
- Presented by: The Danish Civil Protection League
- Eligibility: Any one
- Post-nominals: C.F.F.H
- Status: Active
- Established: 9 November 1956
- First award: 17 June 1957

Highlights
- Total: 771 (2019)
- Ribbon of the medal

Precedence
- Next (higher): Dansk Røde Kors fortjensttegn
- Next (lower): Reserveofficersforeningen i Danmarks hæderstegn

The Badge of Honor of the League of Civil Defense (Danish: Beredskabsforbundets Hæderstegn) was instituted in 1956 by King Frederik IX and may be awarded to persons who have done noteworthy deeds for the Civil Defense cause, over a prolonged period of time (minimum 15 years). The medal is awarded by the president of the Danish Civil Defense Association, Beredskabsforbundet.

== History ==
The first notion of a medal was on October 8, 1953, when the Association of Police Chiefs in Denmark wrote the Civil Defense Agency (later the Danish Emergency Management Agency), asking for in institution of an award to civilians who had made significant contribution to the police, for example in the creation of evacuation plans. The Civil Defense Agency passed to task onto the Civil Defense Association, and in 1956 the statutes of the medal was approved by the Ministry of Interior and later the King.

The Badge of Honour was established on the November 30th 1956 and was first awarded on June 17, on the birthday of hofjægermester Torben Foss. Foss was the founder and first president of Dansk Luftværnsforening (Danish Air Guard Association) (later the Civil Defense Association).

The Civil Defense Association changed its name from CivilforsvarsForbundet to Beredskabsforbundet in the mid 2000s and on October 1, 2007, after petition from the Ministry of Defense, Her Majesty Queen Margrethe II approved that the medal changed names from Civilforsvars-Forbundets Hæderstegn to Beredskabsforbundets Hæderstegn.

== Criteria ==
There are 3 groups of people who may be awarded the medal:

- Persons, who over a prolonged period of time, have done noteworthy work within the field of Civil Defense
  - This group may be volunteers and employees under the Civil Defense League
  - "A prolonged period of time" normally means at least 15 years
  - "Noteworthy work" means work above and beyond that of the average
    - 5-6 medals may be given to this group annually
- Persons who in a special degree have made themselves noteworthy in their work for the Civil Defense cause
  - This may, for example, be fire chiefs who over a period of years have helped strengthen the use of volunteers
    - 4-5 medals may be given to this group annually. The Danish Emergency Management Agency (DEMA) controls the use of 2 of these.
- Other persons who have done noteworthy work for the Civil Defense cause
  - This group is most often politicians and other public key-figures
    - 1-3 medals may be given to this group annually

Normally the total maximum of medals awarded each year is 12.

== Notable recipients ==
- King Frederik IX, 1957
- Queen Ingrid, 1957
- Princess Caroline-Mathilde of Denmark, 1965
- Queen Margrethe II, 1974
- Prince Henrik, 1984
- Sir John Hodsoll, Senior NATO Advisor to the Committee on Civil Defense, 1959
- Fire Inspector Henrik Sunekær, 1992
- Fire Chief Carsten Iversen, Roskilde Brandvæsen, 2010
- MP Bjarne Laustsen, President, 2010
- Master Sergeant (CD) Jacob D. Madsen, Danish Emergency Management Agency, 2014
- Major (CD) Sune Schønnemann, Deputy Regional Commander, youngest recipient of the award, 2019
