= Thora Fiedler =

Danish nurse, prosthetist and nursing home principal

Thora Nielsen Fiedler
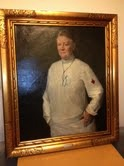
- Portrait of Fiedler
- Born: 15 March 1854; Nyborg, Denmark
- Died: April 13, 1941; Lynge, Denmark
- Resting place: Holsteinborg Cemetery, Holsteinborg Castle
- Occupations: Nurse; Prosthetist; Inventor; Nursing home principal

Thora Nielsen Fiedler (15 March 1854 in Nyborg – 13 March 1941 in Lynge) was a Danish nurse, prosthetist and nursing home principal. She helped expand a nursing home for disabled people, and later in her life became the principal of this nursing home. She created a prosthetic workshop and invented new types of prosthetics.

== Early life ==
Fiedler was born in Nyborg to farmer, road inspector and birk bailiff Harald Valdemar Fiedler (1808–87) and Marie Sophie Kirstine Jensen (1830–1905). Fiedler's parents weren't married until six years after her birth. Fiedler was one of three daughters, her sisters named Thora and Elisif. All three began to study to become nurses in 1886–87, with Fiedler studying at the municipal hospital under Danish Red Cross (Danish: Dansk Røde Kors). Both of Fiedler's sisters went to Frederiks Hospital to study. Finishing the education at the Red Cross took 15 months.

== Career ==
Fiedler stayed with the Red Cross. In 1888 she became a private nurse for Red Cross and in 1893 one of her patients was Johanne Petersen. Petersen had since 1874 run a school for paralyzed girls. She also founded the Cripple Home (Danish: Hjemmet for Vanføre), a nursing home for handicapped and disabled people, which used shifting Red Cross sisters as nurses. Johanne Petersen grew fond of Fiedler, who was employed as a full-time nurse at the Cripple Home in 1894. The home was small, and Fiedler helped expand it. The home's prosthetics workshop was expanded so much, under Fiedler, that it was able to cover the needs of the home itself as well as other hospitals.

Although her main assignments were at the hospital beds, Fiedler began constructing bandages and prosthetics on her own. She stayed after work, and built the prosthetics from scrap, working with leather, steel and metals. When she had finished a prototype, she had the home's patients construct the prosthetics as work therapy. Over time the workshops grew, and Fiedler ran these workshops alongside her job as nurse, and the number of handicapped patients that worked in them grew. The patients were employed and paid, and gave them a job. Producing their own prosthetics also saved the home money.

Fiedler invented a number of prosthetics, adapted to the individual, that allowed patients to handle many things themselves, which they would have needed a nurse for otherwise. In 1908 Fiedler became the principal of the nursing home. During the First World War experts from the countries involved in the war came to Fiedler's nursing home to learn how to create bandages and prosthetics from Fiedler's models. Fiedler withdrew from her work in 1921.

She was granted the Medal of Merit in 1913. At her 25-year anniversary in 1919 she was celebrated and given monetary gifts. She used this money to found a grant, Frk. Fiedlers Legat.

== Death ==
After leaving her work in 1921 Fiedler moved to Lynge near Sorø, where her parents had lived. She died here on 13 March 1941. She is buried with her parents on Holsteinborg Cemetery by Holsteinborg Castle.

== Honours and decorations ==
- Medal of Merit in Gold (1913)
