= Louise Conring =

Danish superintendent, hospital inspector, deaconess and nurse (1824–1891)

Louise Martine Laurette Conring (1 March 1824 – 1 April 1891) was a Danish superintendent, hospital inspector, deaconess and nurse. Charged by Princess Louise to investigate the Deaconess Institutes in Germany, Sweden and France with a view to creating one in Denmark, Conring was the first Danish woman to be trained in nursing, ultimately heading the Deaconess Institute in Copenhagen from 1863.

== Biography ==
Born on 1 March 1824 at Rungsted in Hørsholm Municipality, Conring was the daughter of August Georg Carl Conring and his wife Hanne Christiane Braem. She was a fragile child who spent her childhood winters mainly in bed at her parents' home in Rendsburg, then in Danish Schleswig, where her father was a customs official, and the summers on her grandparents' farm at Rungsted, north of Copenhagen. Owing to her poor health, Conring seldom went to school but was taught by her mother and other tutors at home, together with her sister.

From the age of 13, she attended church regularly, becoming even more religious after her mother died in 1839. During the First Schleswig War, she spent three pleasant years in Copenhagen (1848–51) in affluent circles where she was encouraged to take part in charitable work. She joined Queen Caroline Amalie's nursing and child care associations. After spending a few years in Neustadt, she returned to Copenhagen where she was appointed inspector (i.e. director) of the Børneplejeforening (Child Care Association) with responsibility for 400 children. She was the first woman in Denmark to be given such an appointment. The work was not easy and she called on assistance from various circles, one of which brought her into contact with Princess (later Queen) Louise.

While in Neustadt, Conring had assisted the philanthropist Amalie Sieveking in her work with Hamburg's poor. She also visited the Deaconess House in Kaiserswerth near Düsseldorf which had been established by Theodor Fliedner and his wife Friederike in 1836. She was attracted by the deaconess approach which allowed women to care for the sick while learning both theology and nursing skills. Following Fliender's example, deaconess mother houses were also established in Norway and Sweden. In 1861, Princess Louise began to look for a Danish woman who could run a deaconess establishment in Denmark. On the recommendation of Nicolai Gottlieb Blædel, pastor of Garrison Church, Copenhagen, she chose Conring who accepted the appointment after visiting the Deaconess Institute in Stockholm. In March 1863, she became the first Danish deaconess, installed by Fliedner himself in Kaiserswerth.

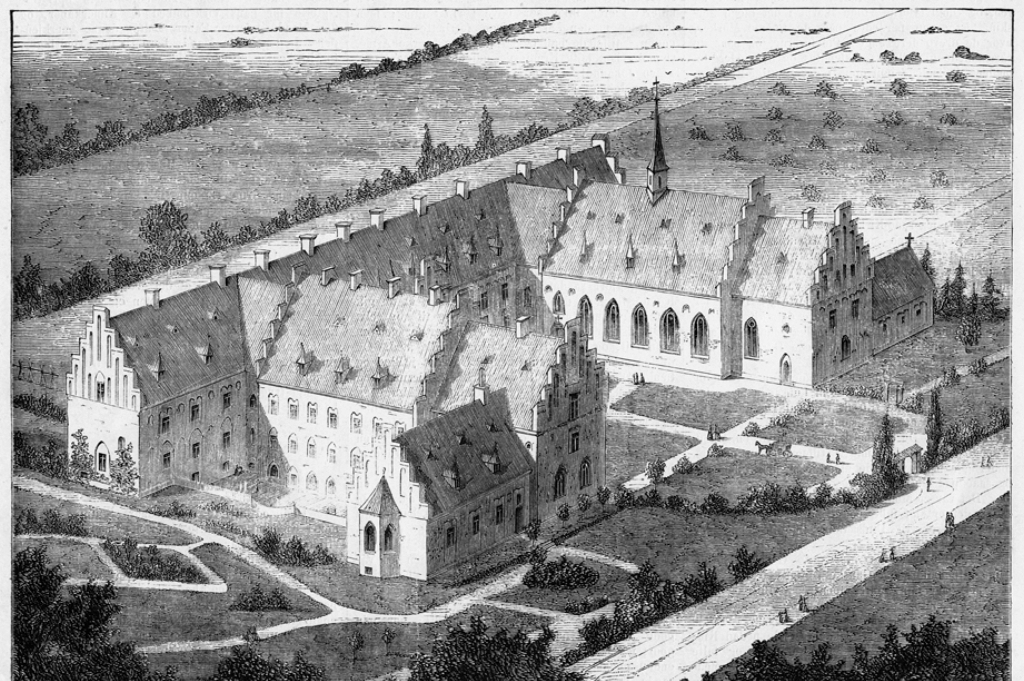
Deaconess Institute, Smallegade, 1873

Under Conring's leadership, the first Deaconess Institute was opened in Frederiksberg's Smallegade on 26 May 1863. Initially, there were four sisters (nurses) but the establishment grew quickly, accommodating 63 patients and 17 sisters over the first two years. In 1865, new premises were acquired and in 1873 today's Deaconess Institute building was opened. Conring adopted a strict, old-fashioned approach in running the institute, becoming especially difficult in handling male patients. Two of her male colleagues left in protest but she maintained the respect of her female colleagues and toned down her approach on Queen Louise's advice.

Louise Conring died in the Frederiksberg district of Copenhagen on 1 April 1891. Succeeded by Sophie Zahrtmann, she left behind her a thriving institution which enjoyed a network of support throughout the country.
