= Ilia Fibiger =

Danish writer and playwright

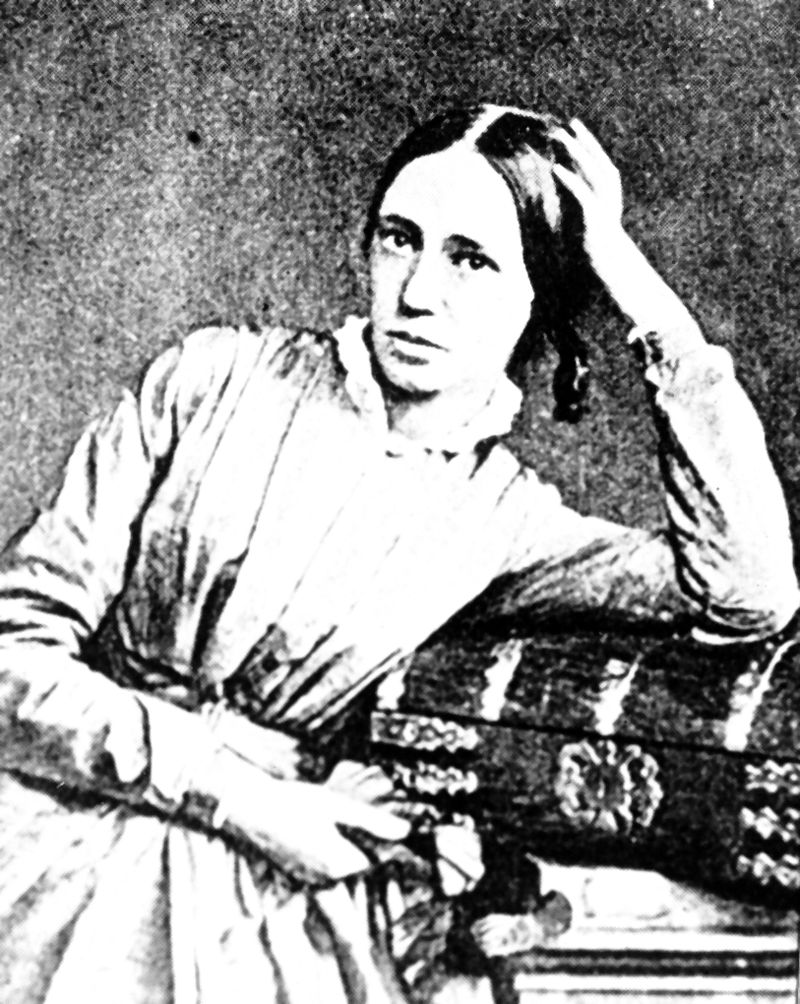
Ilia Fibiger

Ilia Fibiger (5 October 1817 – 10 June 1867) was a Danish writer and playwright as well as Denmark's first professional nurse. She was the elder sister of writer and feminist Mathilde Fibiger.

== Literary work ==
Ilia Fibiger published four volumes of plays of which Modsætninger (Contradictions) was produced at the Royal Danish Theatre in 1860. She also published four volumes of tales and the novel Magdalene (1862).

== Social engagements ==
Fibiger was a volunteer at the poor hospital in Copenhagen during the 1853 cholera outbreak. Unable to make a living from her writings, she worked as Denmark's first professional nurse from 1854 until 1860. She later moved into one of the Danish Medical Association's social housing developments now known as Brumleby.
