= Danish Emergency Management Agency =

Danish governmental agency under the Ministry of Defence

- Beredskabsstyrelsen

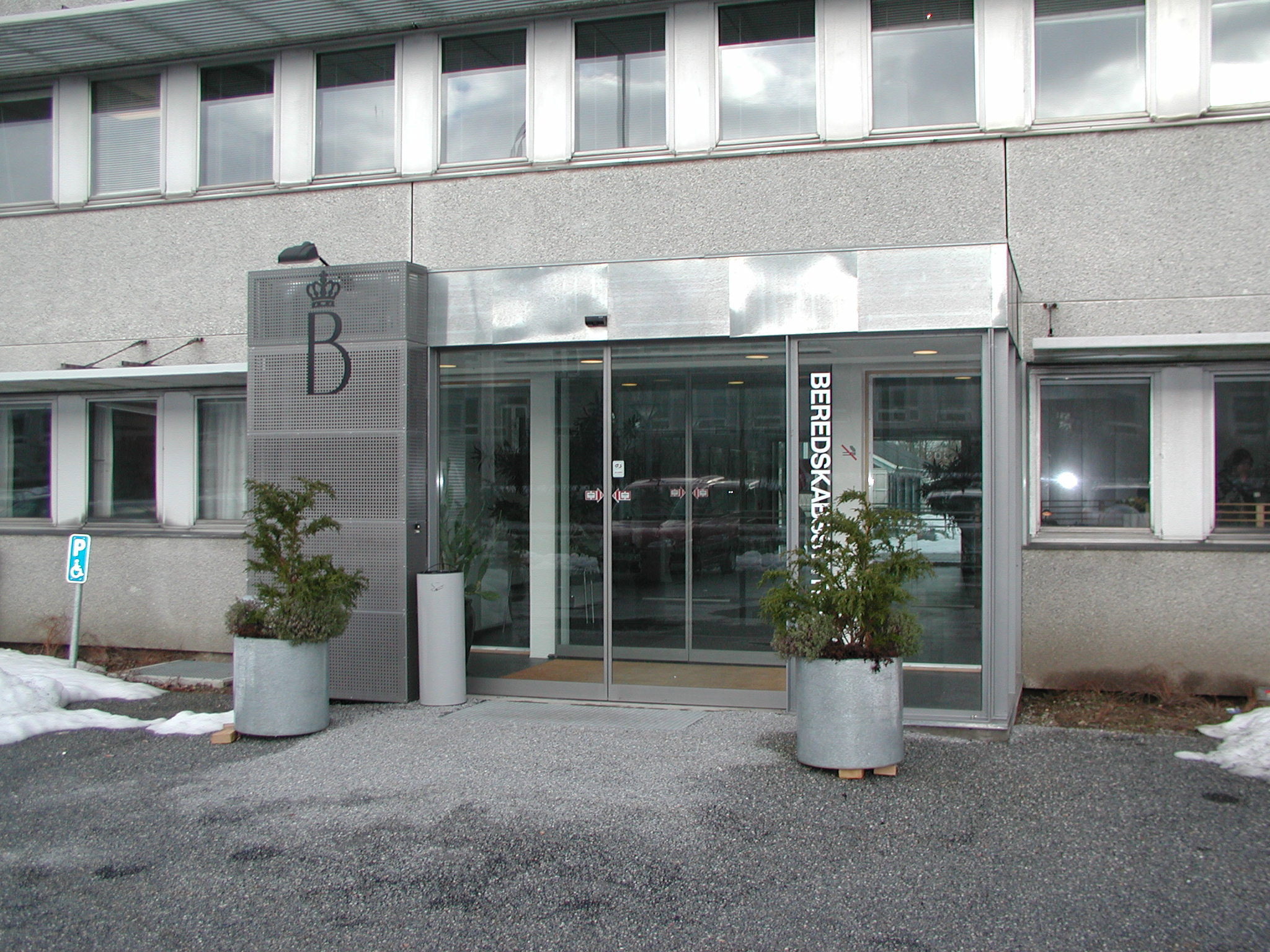
- Entrance to DEMA

Organisation overview
- Formed: 23 December 1992; 33 years ago
- Type: Emergency management
- Headquarters: Birkerød, Denmark
- Employees: 600 staff ~450 conscripts every 9 months 400+ volunteers
- Annual budget: 496 million DKK (2005)
- Organisation executive: Christine Engel Christensen, Director
- Parent Organisation: Ministry of Resilience and Preparedness
- Website: Official Webpage

The Danish Emergency Management Agency (DEMA) (Danish: Beredskabsstyrelsen) is a Danish governmental agency under the Ministry of Societal Resilience and Contingency. Its principal task is to manage an operational part who work out of six Emergency Management Centres, and administrative and legalizing part, who supervises the national and municipal rescue preparedness and advises the authorities on matters of preparedness. DEMA works in closely structured co-operation with the EU, UN and several neighbouring countries.

DEMA is capable of deploying abroad on request from another state or an international organisation. The decision to render assistance is taken in co-counsel with the Danish Foreign Ministry. DEMA can give support in instances of natural disasters and accidents, technological events and crises and civil wars. It is able to react quickly in acute situations and leave its home base within hours on smaller missions, and have the ability to deploy a mobile hospital in only 24 hours.

== History ==
By the Danish Preparedness Act (Beredskabsloven), which came into force on 1 January 1992, the former WW2 era wartime civil defense corps was changed into a peacetime "Emergency Management Agency", that could primarily work in peacetime. The Danish Emergency Management Agency was created out of the two agencies responsible for these former services, namely "Civilforsvarsstyrelsen" (Civil Defense Agency) and "Statens Brandinspektion" (Governmental Fire Inspection Agency).

The Civil Defence was created on 1 March 1938, as the State Civil Air Defence (Statens civile luftværn) and was under the responsibility of the Ministry of the Interior. The name Civil Defence dates from the first Civil Defence law of 1 April 1949. The municipal fire services and the Governmental Fire Inspection Agency was under the Ministry of Justice. The new Danish Emergency Management Agency came under the responsibility of Ministry of the Interior, however as of 1 February 2004 it is under the Ministry of Defence.

By means of a number of political agreements supported widely by the parties in the Danish Parliament, the rescue preparedness has been continuously developed and adapted to the changing demands made by the society and the changes in the security-policy situation.

=== DEMA and the public ===
When the Civil Air Defense was created the vehicles were old gray trucks, and this truck-color was kept for many years. The uniform of the Civil Air Defense, and later the Civil Defense was also kept gray, with orange shoulders and blue triangles - The international icon for civil protection. Later the vehicles were painted orange to show that it is a true Civil Defense agency and still are this color - Denmark being one of the only nations left still using the Civil Defense colors and logo to this extent. The uniforms were modernized in the year 2000, and the old gray uniform was replaced by a new dark blue uniform, called M/2000. The uniform has been edited sometimes, and a new rescue-uniform was created in 2009 for USAR teams. The M/2000 is being replaced by a new uniform currently under development.

When on international deployment the DEMA often uses discrete civilian clothing, mostly in a sand/brown color. Experiences have shown that the dark blue uniform may often be mistaken as military or police in other countries, and this has given some unfortunate situations. The only current deployment where the uniform is used is the UNIFIL deployment in Lebanon, where a special uniform has been developed for the hot climate.

Although DEMA hasn't been called Civil Defense (Civilforsvaret) for more than 15 years, the general public still often refers to it as the Civil Defense, and a lot don't know what DEMA is.

=== Ministry of Resilience and Preparedness ===
In August 2024, the government created, among others, the new Ministry of Resilience and Preparedness (Ministeriet for samfundssikkerhed og beredskab). This new ministry would encompass emergency planning, legislation of firefighting and fire prevention and rescue work.

DEMA officially moved from the defence ministry the Ministry of Resilience and Preparedness in January 2025. At this time DEMA also gained responsibility for the coastal rescue service (kystredningstjenesten), the office for safe waters (sikre farvand), the marine pollution services and the 112-system in Denmark. At this time DEMA also changed directors to Christine Engel Christensen, as the former director Laila Reenberg was made director of the sister organisation Styrelsen for Samfundsikkerhed.

In January 2025, DEMA also gained an additional 608m Danish kroner (ca. 89m USD) in budget. This was done as part of a movement to strengthen disaster preparedness as well as cyber security

== Emergency Operations ==
=== Municipal fire departments ===
The primary firefighting work in Denmark is done by municipal fire departments and all municipalities are required by law to have a fire department. Before 1992 the municipal fire department were controlled by "Statens Brandinspektion" (Governmental Fire Inspection Agency), but with the law-change in 1992 the responsibility was given to the Civil Preparedness Division of DEMA.

The municipalities do not have to do the firefighting themselves, and a large part of the fire department services are done by the private firm Falck A/S.

=== Regional Support Centers ===
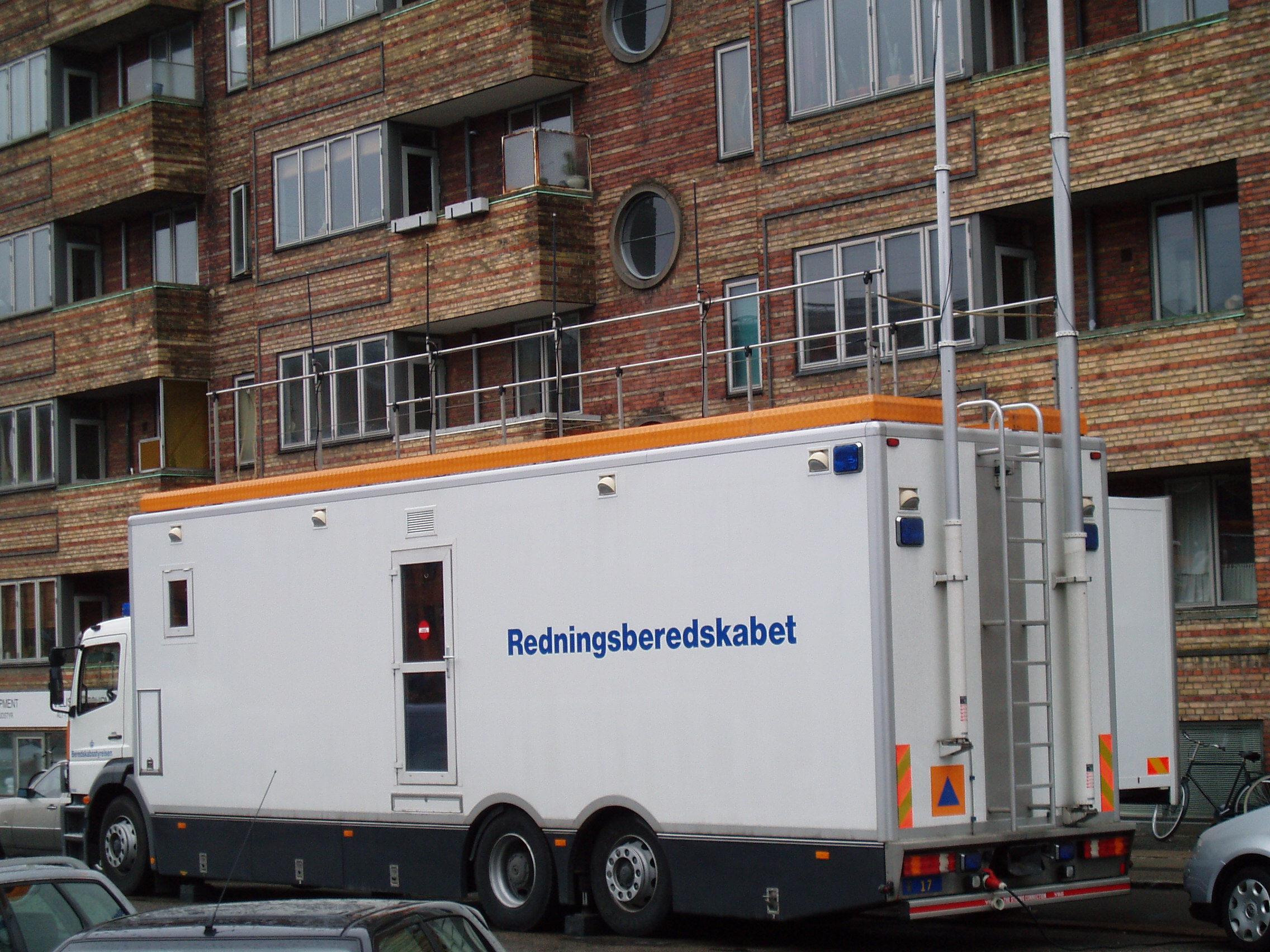
The Command and Communications Module is often used to support major police operations

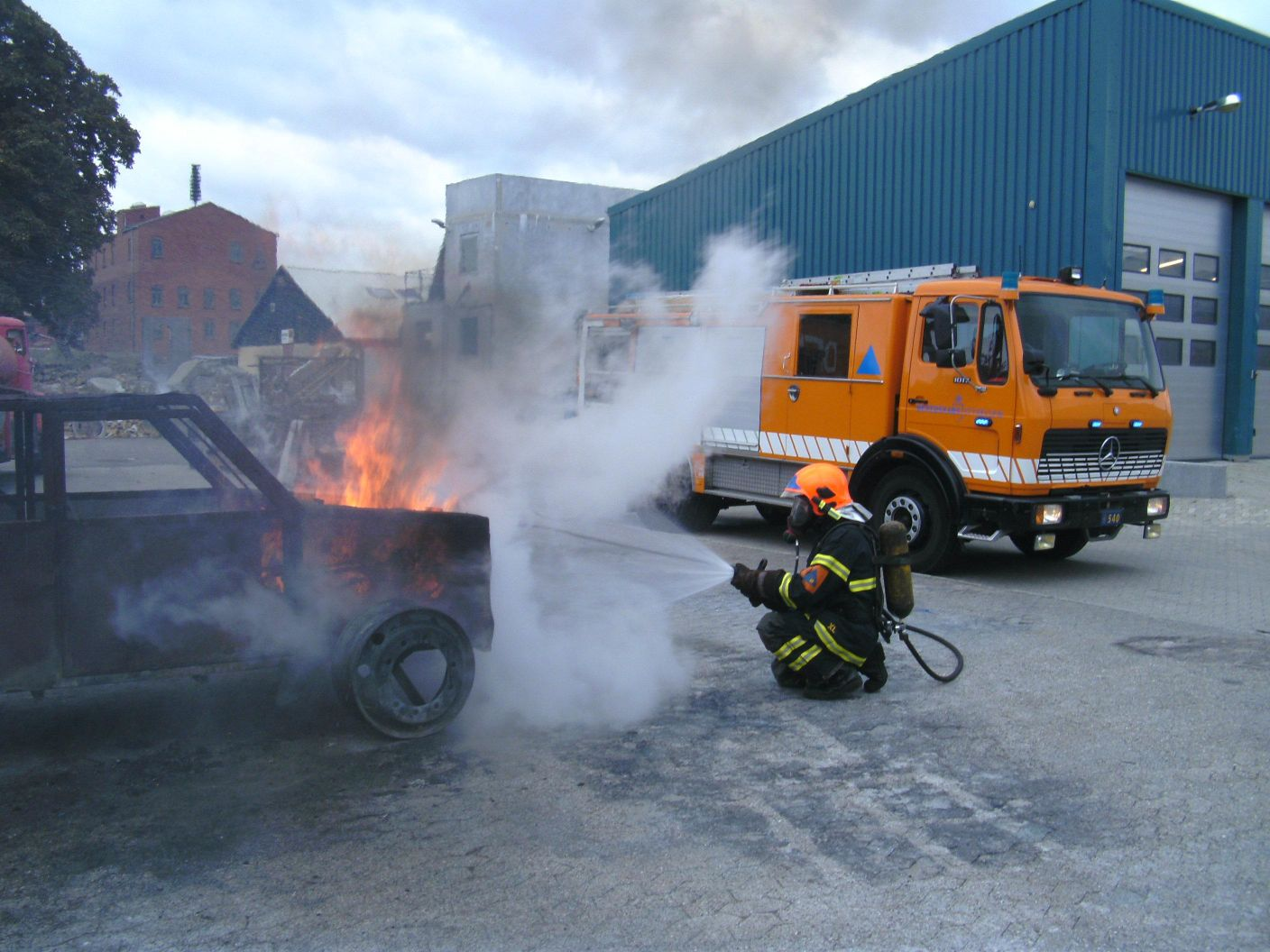
DEMA Volunteer extinguishing a car fire during a training exercise

The agency has a staff of some 600 people. About 170 of these are employed in the central Emergency Management Agency in Birkerød. The rest are employed at the agency's six centers and two schools. It is possible to do conscription-service for the Danish military in the operational section of DEMA and the agency has around 450 conscripts every 9 months. Unlike the military where the normal service length is 4 months and there are no operational tasks, conscription service in DEMA is 9 months in length. Also the conscripts are made part of the national emergency response after 1 month of service and are often participation in firefighting and rescue operations. The conscripts get a full firefighters education and are trained in the following fields:

- Firefighting
- Rescue and USAR
- Advanced first aid, patient assessment and treatment (On EMT-B level)
- Communications
- Heavy vehicle usage (All conscripts must have a normal drivers license before starting, and are offered a lorry-license for free)
- HAZMAT

The Emergency Management Centers are located all over the country and almost every part of the country can be reached within one hour of receiving the alarm. The centers are located in:

- Beredskabsstyrelsen Nordjylland (Thisted)(conscription barracks and specialist in breathing apparatus)
- Beredskabsstyrelsen Midtjylland (Herning)(conscription barracks and specialist in international operations)
- Beredskabsstyrelsen Sydjylland (Haderslev)(conscription barracks and specialist in uniform and protective clothing)
- Beredskabsstyrelsen Sjælland (Næstved)(conscription barracks and specialist in specialized vehicles)
- Beredskabsstyrelsen Bornholm (Allinge) (conscription barracks)
- Beredskabsstyrelsen Hedehusene (Hedehusene) (300 man large volunteer center)

The primary function of the above centers is to assist municipal fire departments at major fires, assist to police, and to take care of the Danish nuclear fallout preparedness, HazMat preparedness, USAR/rescue preparedness and all other relevant tasks. Beredskabsstyrelsen Hedehusene is a 100% volunteer center the only exception being the chief officer and some teachers offering courses to private rescue firms. All the other centers are staffed by conscripts who are controlled by a single officer and a couple of sergeants.

=== Municipal Support Centers (2000-2012) ===
Besides from the regional support centers there were also (from 2000 to 2012) some minor support points that had equipment paid for by DEMA, but were staffed by municipal volunteer firefighters. These support points were, like the regional support points, support centers for the municipal fire departments in case of major fires and other emergencies. With the new political defense agreement of 2012, the Municipal Support Centers were officially closed. Most of the municipal fire departments were offered to buy the equipment at very low costs.

The Municipal Support Centers were located at:

- Beredskabscenter Aalborg (Aalborg)
- Århus Brandvæsen (Århus)
- Beredskabet (Esbjerg)
- Fredericia Brandvæsen (Fredericia)
- Odense Brandvæsen (Odense)
- Kalundborg Brand & Redning (Kalundborg)
- Beredskabsforvaltningen (Fredensborg-Humlebæk)
- Falster Redningsberedskab (Nykøbing Falster)
- Greve Redningsberedskab (Greve), most equipment given to the volunteer centre in Hedehusene

=== International Operations ===
DEMA has participated in several international operations since the beginning of the '90s. Some notable missions are:

- Supply run in Bosnia in 1992 (here the convoy was attacked and a civil defense sergeant was killed)
- USAR after the 1992 Earthquake in Turkey
- Mobile Hospital in Afghanistan
- Mobile Hospital in Aceh after the 2004 Indian Ocean earthquake and tsunami
- Evacuation of Danish civilians from Lebanon during the 2006 conflict
- 2010 Pakistan earthquake
- In 2010 DEMA won a 10-year-long contract with the UN about manning a fire department at UN HQ in Naqoura, Lebanon. The mission was closed in 2011, due to political resistance.
- 2011 Japan earthquake disaster and following nuclear incident

== Other departments ==
=== Nuclear Division ===
The Nuclear Division's responsibilities include:

- Inspections of the shutdown of the only nuclear facility in Denmark at Risø,
- The Danish nuclear preparedness
- International cooperation on nuclear safety and nuclear preparedness within the Nordic countries, the EU (EURATOM)
- The IAEA and the OECD
- Nuclear support programmes for countries in Eastern Europe

=== Chemical Division ===
The chemical division's responsibilities include:

- Analytical chemical investigations of unknown substances, including chemical warfare agents and explosives.
- Examination of dangerous goods and hazardous materials.
- Advisory services, including the National Chemical Response Center (Kemikalieberedskabsvagten), and education and research.

=== Civil Preparedness Division ===
The Danish Preparedness Act stipulates that each ministry, agency, or other authority in the Danish government is required to carry out relevant planning within their respective sector to deal with a serious adverse impact on critical functions of society. CPD helps facilitate planning within the different sectors and the coordination between the different sectors. This includes responsibility for national emergency planning, publication of guidance materials, courses, and other activities to strengthen the cooperation between the different actors in the Danish civil preparedness establishment.

Most recently the education for both firefighters and fire chiefs has been completely revised in 2009 and 2010.

=== Emergency Management Schools ===
- DEMA Staff College (Snekkersten)
- DEMA Technical College (Tinglev)
- Bernstorff Palace, DEMA Management Academy, (Gentofte) (closed in 2008)

== Insignia ==
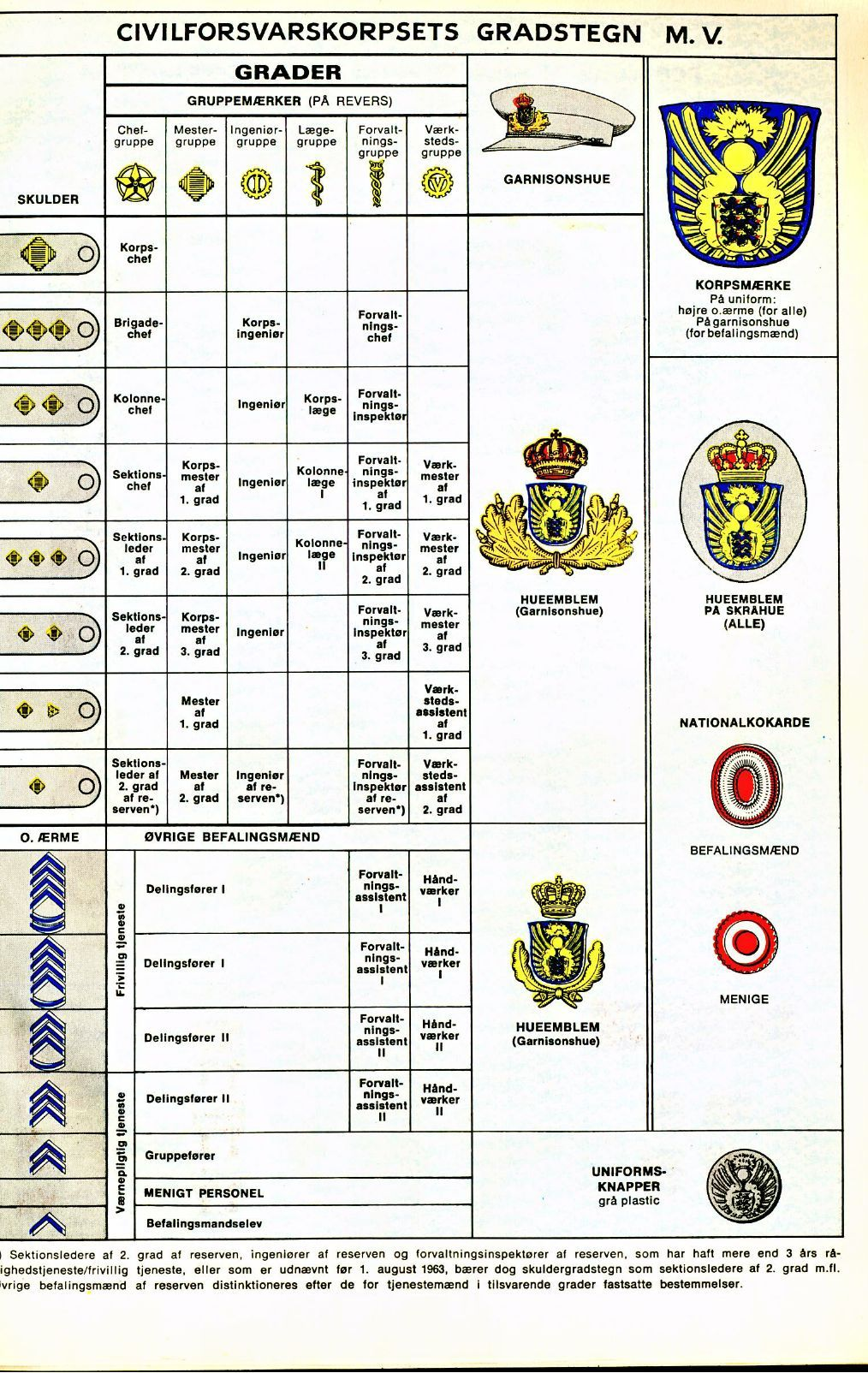
Rank insignia 1972

=== Commissioned officer ranks ===
The rank insignia of commissioned officers.

Rank group	Director & Vice director		Officers
DEMA
DEMA	Direktør	Vicedirektør	Brigadechef	Kolonnechef	Sektionschef	Sektionsleder	Korpsmester	Mester	Mester af reserven

=== Other ranks ===
The rank insignia of non-commissioned officers and enlisted personnel.

Rank group	NCOs					Enlisted
DEMA
DEMA	Chefsergent	Seniorsergent	Oversergent	Sergent	Sergent (til pligtig tjeneste)	Beredskabskorporal	Beredskabsspecialist	Beredskabsoverkonstabel	Beredskabskonstabel

== See also ==
- Emergency management
