= Danish Nurses' Organization =

Trade union

DSR/DNO
- Danish Nurses' Organization
- Dansk Sygeplejeråd
- Founded: 1899
- Headquarters: Copenhagen, Denmark
- Location: Denmark
- Members: 74,000 (2006)
- Key people: Grete Christensen, president
- Affiliations: FTF, PSI
- Website: www.dsr.dk

The Danish Nurses' Organization (DNO; Dansk Sygeplejeråd, DSR) is a trade union in Denmark. It represents 95% of all nurses with a membership of 75,000.

The DNO is affiliated with the FTF – Confederation of Professionals in Denmark and Public Services International.

The motto of The Danish Nurses' Organization is: We move borders—in the organization, profession and society.
