= Diakonissestiftelsen =

Coordinates: 55.6784°N 12.5187°E

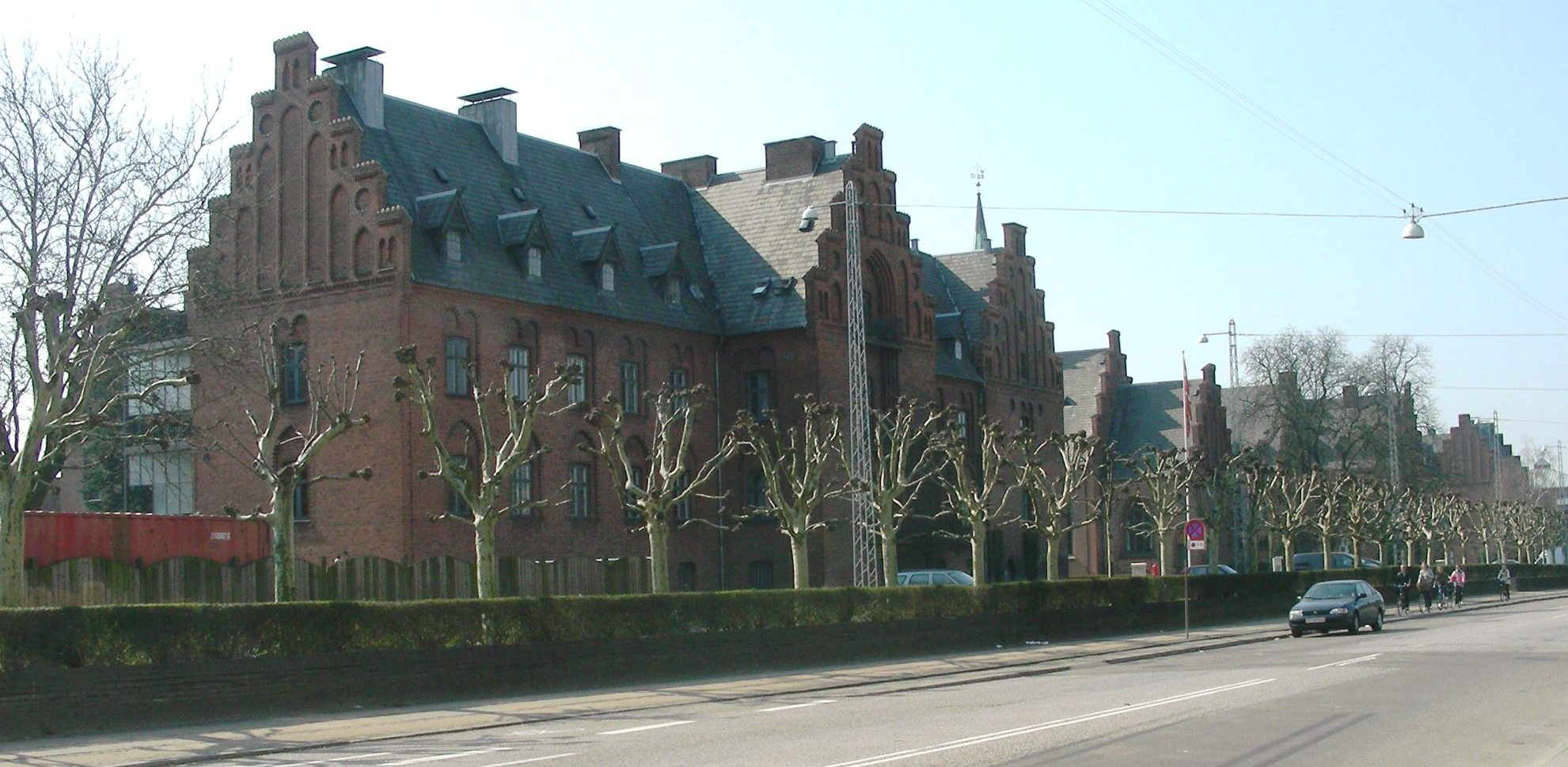
Diakonissestiftelsen seen from Peter Bangs Vej

Diakonissestiftelsen (lit. 'the Deaconess Foundation') is a large site in the Frederiksberg district of Copenhagen, Denmark, owned by the Danish Deaconess Community and used for various social and healthcare-related activities, including a home for the elderly and training of nurses.

== History ==
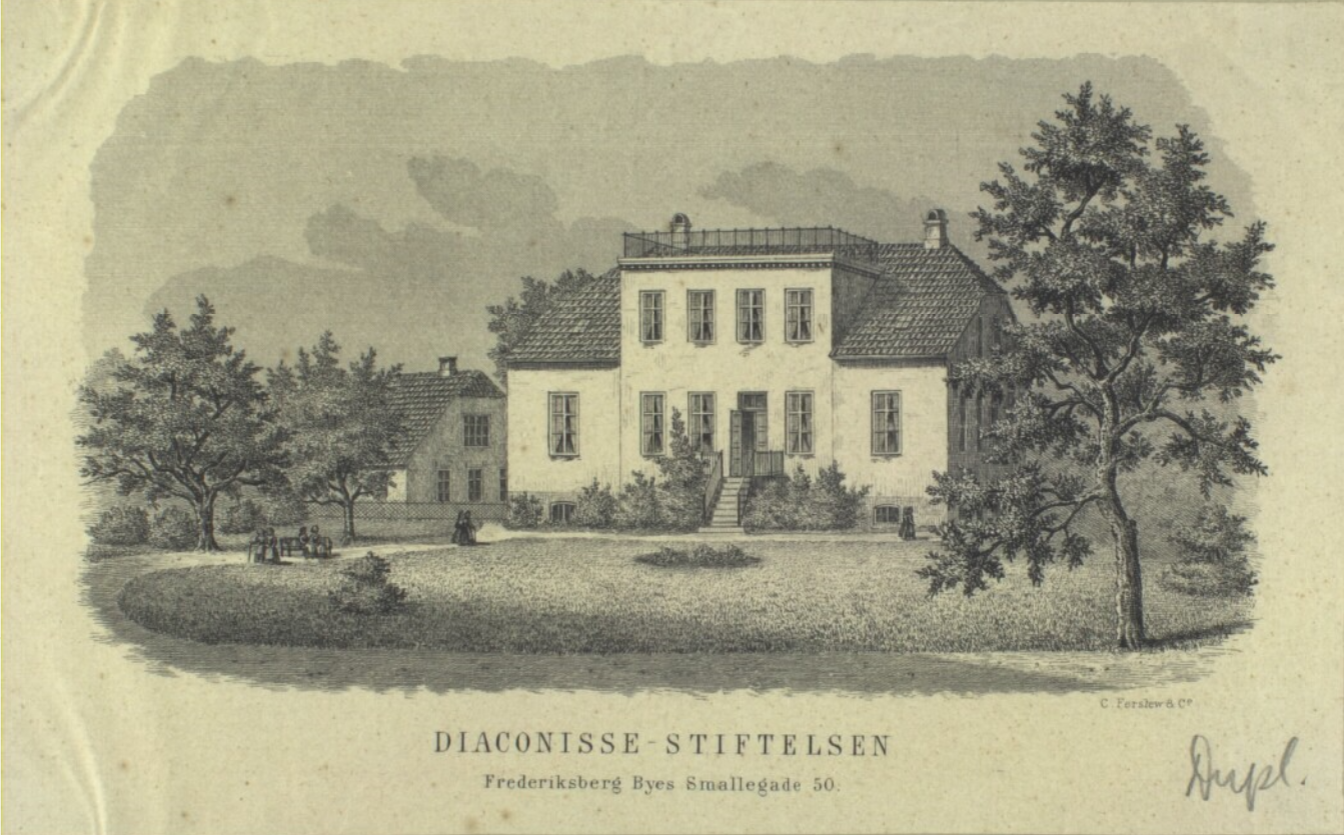
Diakonissestiftelsen's former building on Smallegade in 1865

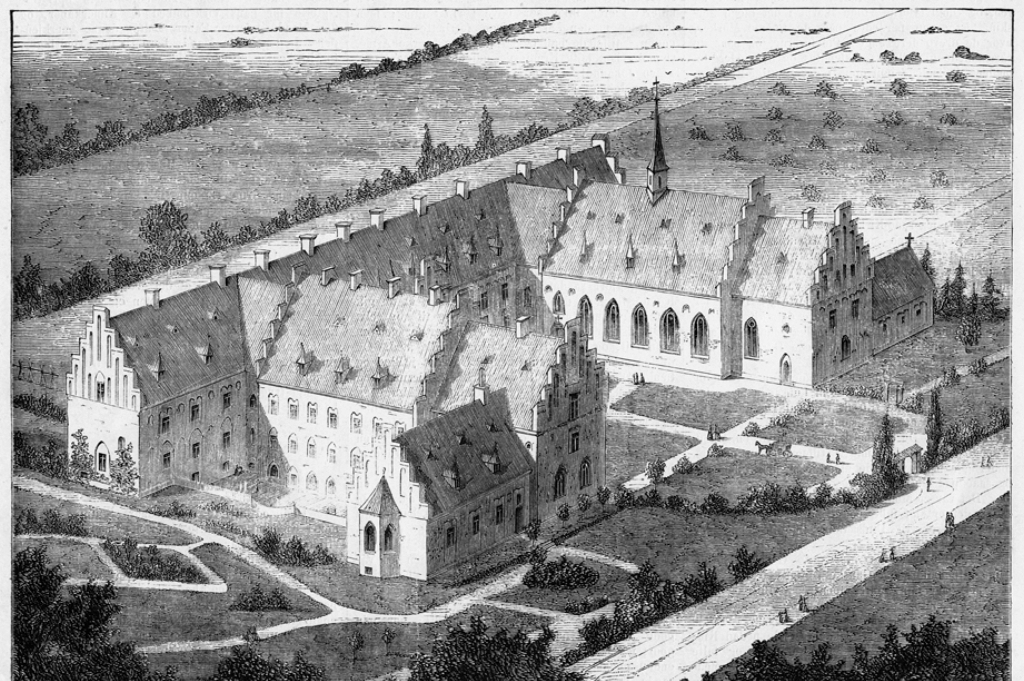
Diakonissestiftelsen in 1873

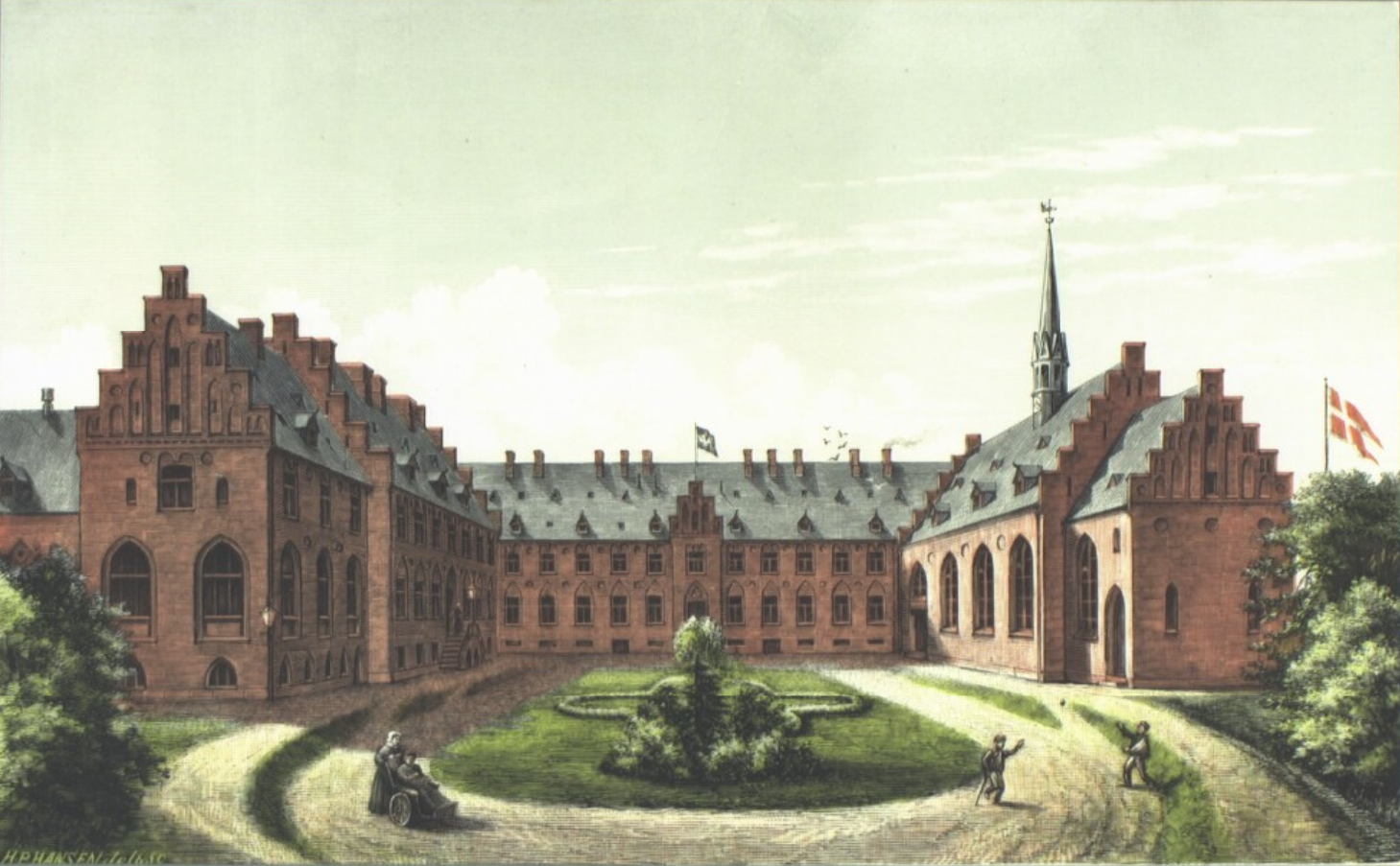
Diakonissestiftelsen by Hans Peter Hansen

Diakonissestiftelsen was founded in 1866 at the initiative of Crown Princess Louise, consort of the later king Christian IX. She instigated Louise Conring to make a study trip to Sweden, where the order had been active for ten years, and to Germany where pastor Theodor Fliedner had opened the first Deaconess motherhouse in 1836 in Düsseldorf-Kaiserswerth in 1836. A building in Smallegade near their current site, contained a small hospital and residences for the Deaconess sisters.

Their current site was inaugurated in 1876. Their hospital in Smallegade closed in 1880.

== The site today ==
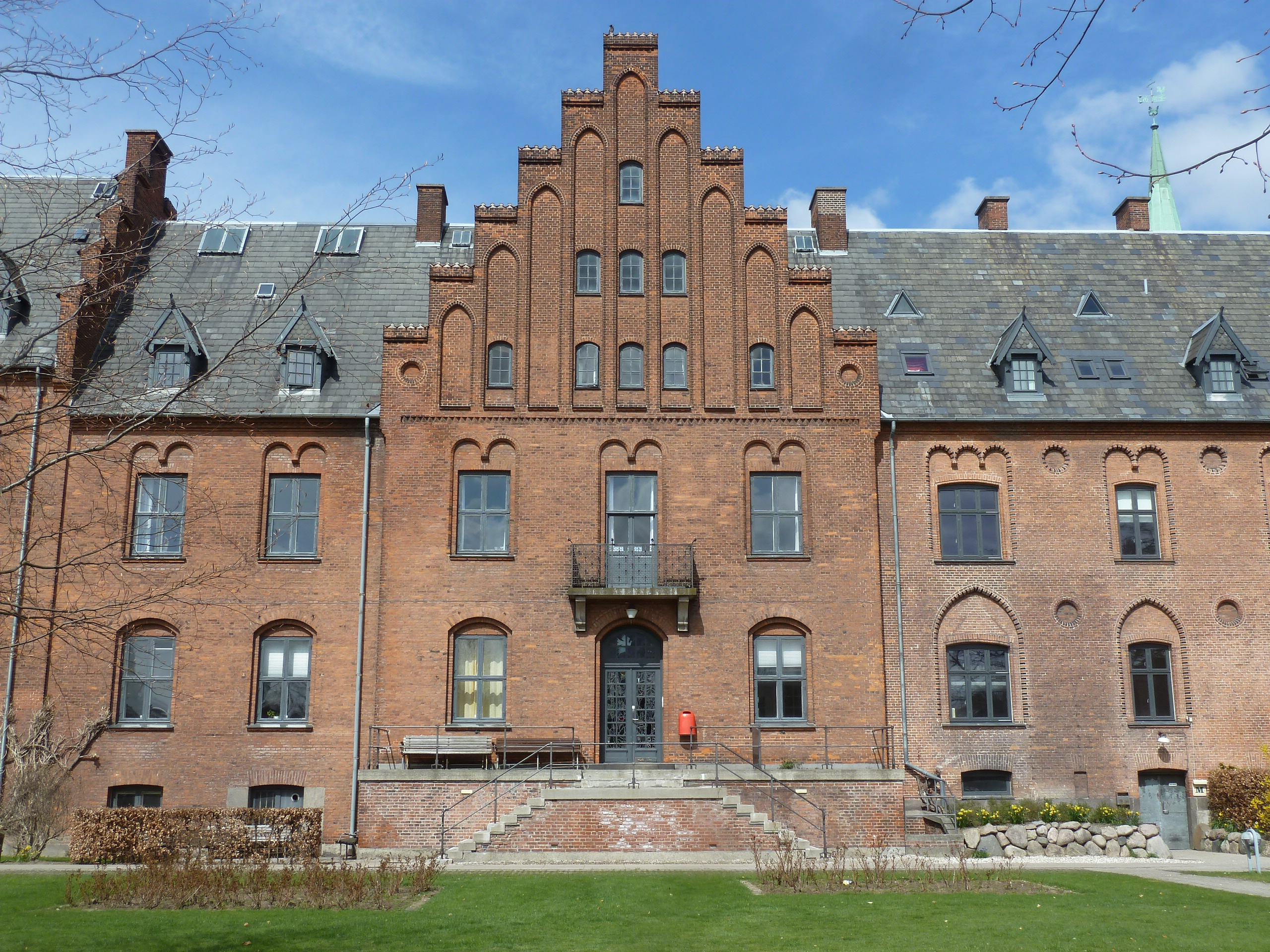
The main wing viewed from the garden

The Deaconesses' premises comprise 33,000 square metres (360,000 sq ft) of buildings on 4 hectares (9.9 acres) of land. The original main building is a long three-winged building which runs along Peter Bange Vej. It was designed by Hans Jørgen Holm in a Neo-Gothic style inspired by medieval monasteries and manor houses. The complex has later been expanded by Gotfred Tvede (1922–1923) and Harald Gad (1937–1939).

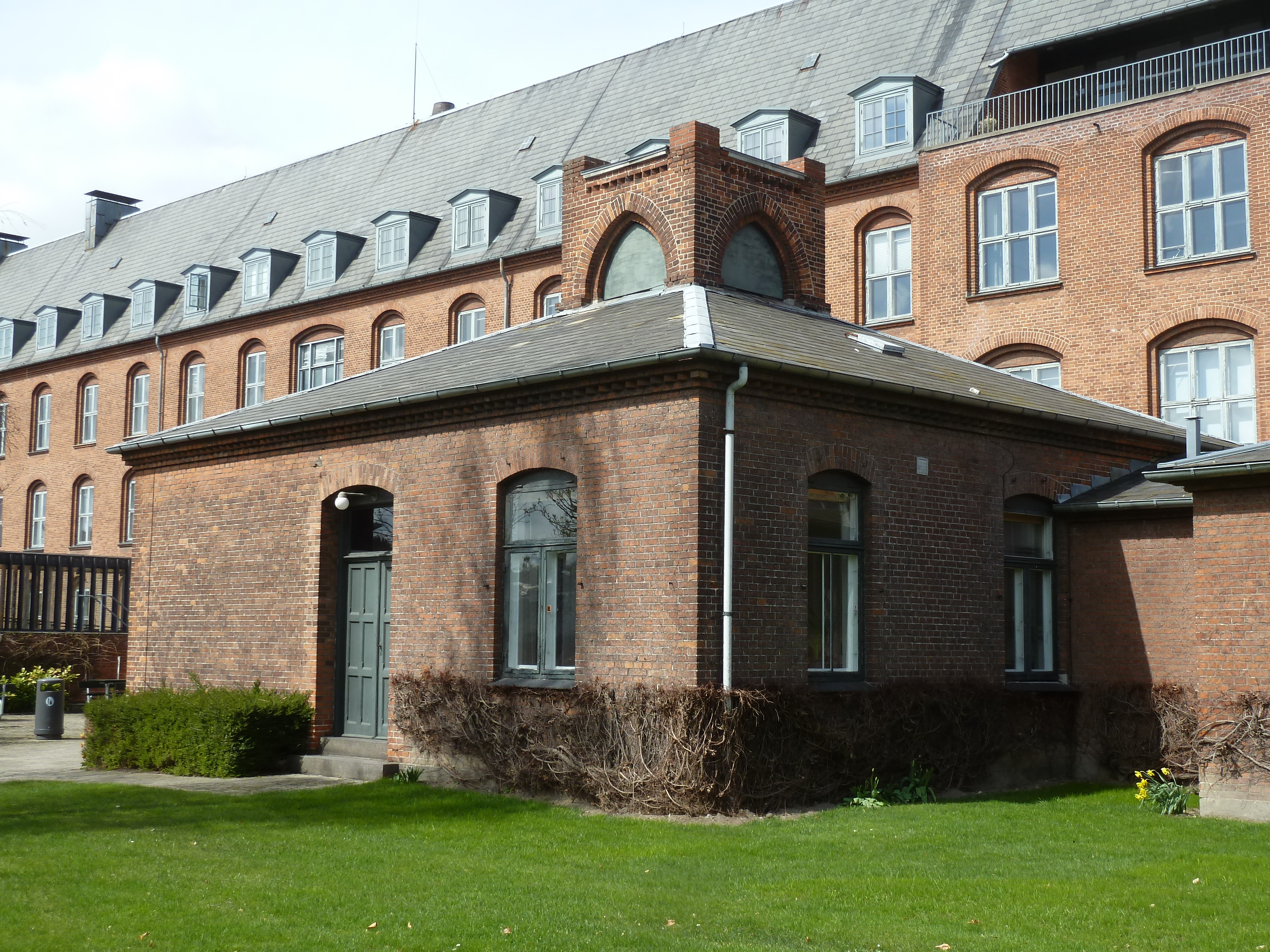
One of the former wash houses

To the rear of the main complex, facing the garden, is a couple of wash houses. Other buildings in the grounds include Søster Sophies Minde, located on Sønder Fasanvej. It was built in the 1950s to provide residences for retired Deaconess sisters.

Diakonissestiftelsen also owns the house Marthabo on the other side of Peter Bangsvej (No. 12) which houses a kindergarten. The building is from 1885 and was designed by C. Lendorff.

== 2020 redevelopment plan ==
In 2011, Diakonissestiftelsen announced plans for a DKK 500 million redevelopment of their site with the twofold ambition to integrate it more in the surrounding cityscape and creating a hub for social and healthcare-related activities. A masterplan competition for the area was settled in April 2012 with two interdisciplinary teams led by Tegnestuen Vandkunsten and Cubo Arkitekter as joint winners.

A competition for the expansion and adaption of Søster Sofies Minde was won by Arkitema in December 2013.

== UC Diakonissestiftelsen ==
Diakonissestiftelsen is home to an educational centre, UC Diakonissestiftelsen, which offers four courses of education: Bachelor of Science in Nursing; Social and Health Care Education; Bachelor of Christianity, Culture and Communication; and an HF program focusing on health and innovation.
