= List of compositions by Frederik Magle =

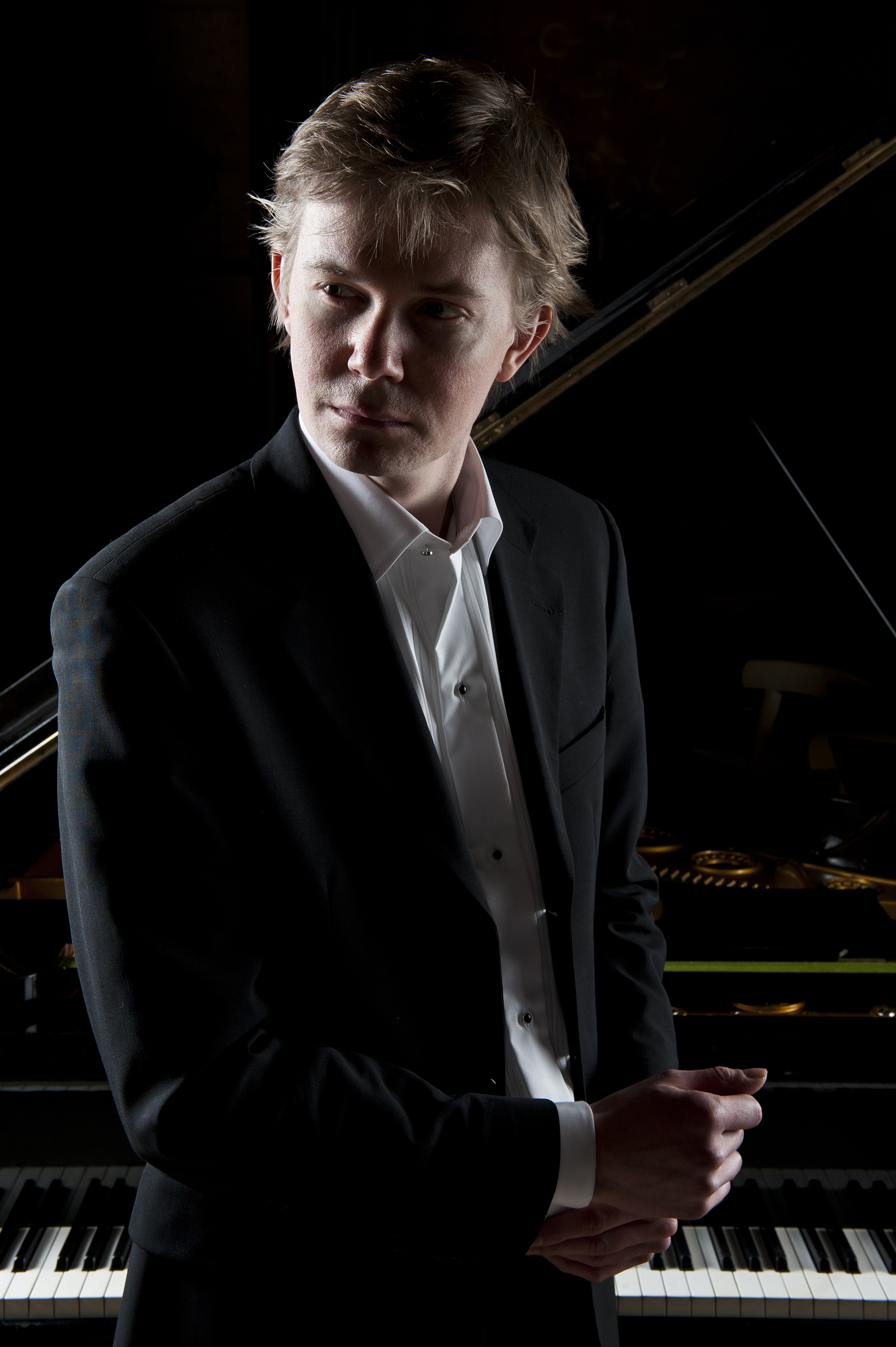
Frederik Magle

This is a list of compositions by Frederik Magle.

== Orchestra ==
- Concerto for organ and orchestra The infinite second (1994)
- Symphonic Lego Fantasia for piano and orchestra, commissioned by the Lego Group (1995–96)
- Rising of a new day (1998)
- Lys på din vej (Light on your path) – orchestral version (1999-2000)
- Cantabile, symphonic suite consisting of three symphonic poems for orchestra, choir, and soloists (2004–2009)

== Choir ==
- A Christmas child mini-musical for choir, flute, recorder, marimba, percussion, bass, and piano (arrangement by Niels Thybo, orchestration by Karsten Vogel, lyrics by Mimi Heinrich) (1987)
- We Are Afraid Cantata for choir, flute, clarinet, percussion, strings, piano, and organ (1988)
- Der Die Das, opera for 2 soloists and choir (by Hotel Pro Forma) (1993)
- Årstidernes sang for choir and organ (1995)
- A newborn child, before eternity, God! Christmas cantata, for brass band, choir, soloists, organ and percussion (1996)
- Cantata to Saint Cecilia for soloists, choir, children's choir, and chamber orchestra (1998)
- The Hope for brass band, choir, organ and percussion, written in memory of the battle of Copenhagen (2001)
- Phoenix for mixed choir and organ or piano four-hands (2003)
- Magnificat for soprano, mixed choir and organ (2010)
- Allehelgenmesse (All Hallows Mass) for soprano, choir, cello and organ (2011)
- The Halloween Present for chamber orchestra, choir, harpsichord, organ, and sound effects (2012)

== Songs and Hymns ==
- 30 hymns (1985)
- 20 songs based on fairy tales by Hans Christian Andersen (1986–92)
- 2 songs, Cristopher Robin and Husmorens morgen with lyrics by Bent Friis Alsinger (1990)
- Alive – Anthem for the pregnant woman for soprano and piano (2012)

== Organ ==
- Fantasia for pipe organ No.1 in C Major (1988)
- Fantasia for organ No.2 The Ocean (1988)
- Fantasia for organ No.3 in E-flat minor The Gate (1989)
- Rhapsody for organ in c minor (1991)
- Symphony for organ No. 1 (1990)
- Festive Prelude for organ (1992)
- Toccata Impression for organ (1992)
- Symphony for organ No. 2 Let there be light (1993)
- "Ilden" from Elementerne (The Elements) (1995)
- Dåbspræludium (1999)
- Fantasia for organ Forårssol (1999)
- Antarktis for organ four-hands (1999)
- Menneskets Årtusind (Human's Millenium) (2000)
- Cantilena (2003)
- Viva Voce (2008)
- At Blive (To Become) (2009)
- Like a Flame, 22 pieces for organ (2009-2010)

== Piano ==
- Fantasia for piano i a-minor (1990)
- A small etude for piano (1991)
- 3 etudes for piano (1993)
- Flammer for Frihed (Flames for Freedom) (1998)
- Fantasie-Impromptu No. 17 (2002)
- Sunset for piano (2007)

== Chamber music ==
- Sonata for violin and organ Vox Humana (1989)
- Duo for violin and cello (1990)
- Duo for violin and piano A thought (1991)
- Sonata for cello and organ From the earth (1992)
- Fantasia for solo cello Sun Dance (1992)
- Lys på din vej (Light on your path) for organ and brass quintet, written for the christening of Prince Nikolai of Denmark (1999)
- Variations and theme Rejse i Tid (Journey in Time) for violin and piano (1999)
- Decet Dage og Nætter (Days and Nights) (1999)
- Intermezzo for brass quintet (2001)
- Kosmos for trumpet and organ (2001)
- Dåbens Pagt (Pact of the Baptism) for brass quintet, written for the christening of Prince Felix of Denmark (2002)
- The Fairest of Roses (Den Yndigste Rose), fanfare for two trumpets and organ (2017)

== Other ==
- Solo for violin Spring Dance (1989)
- Electronic ballet In the Universe (1992)
- Sonata for solo violin A Fairytale (1992)
- Handle with care – Life inside ballet. HD recording (tape) with song, synthesizers and sound effects (1995)
- The March of Joy for brass band (1996)
- En Anden Verden – Indgangen (Another World – The Entrance) for brass band (1997)
- Te Deum for brass band (2001)
