= Per Aage Brandt =

Danish writer and linguist (1944–2021)

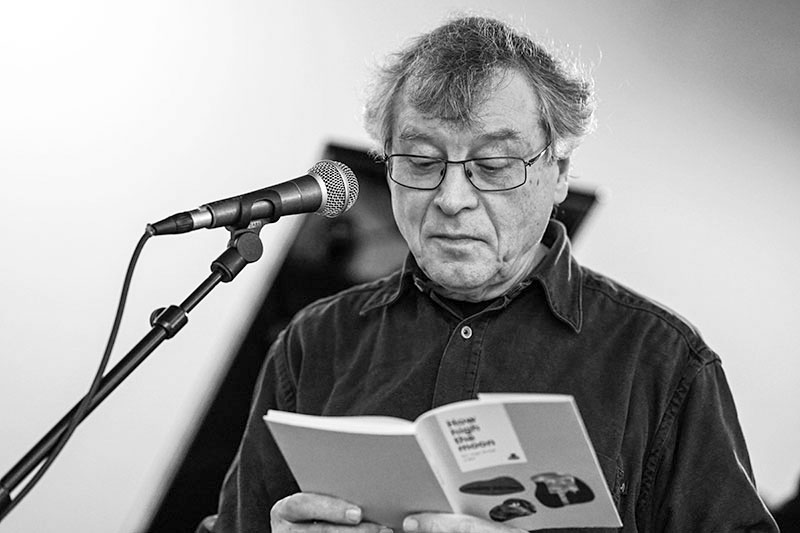
Brandt in 2018

Per Aage Brandt (Danish: [ˈpʰɛɐ̯ ˈɔːwə ˈpʁɑnˀt]; 26 April 1944 – 11 November 2021) was a Danish writer, poet, linguist and musician, born in Buenos Aires. He got his Master of Arts in Romance Philology from the University of Copenhagen (1971) & held a Doctorate of Semiotics from the Sorbonne University (1987).

Brandt published a large number of books on the subjects of semiotics, linguistics, culture, and music as well as poetry.

He made his debut as a poet in 1969 with the poetry collection Poesi and has since then written several poetry collections and essays. He has translated Molière and Marquis de Sade, amongst others, and in 2000 he translated (or "re-wrote" in Danish) the poetry collection Cantabile by Henrik, the prince consort of Denmark. Some of his translations were subsequently set to music in Frederik Magle's symphonic suite Cantabile.

== Bibliography ==
- La Charpente modale du sens, John Benjamins, Amsterdam 1992.
- Dynamiques du sens, Aarhus University Press 1994.
- Morphologies of Meaning, Aarhus University Press 1995.
- Det menneskeligt virkelige, Politisk Revys Forlag, Copenhagen 2002
- Spaces, Domains, and Meaning, Peter Lang, Bern 2004
