= Admiral Fisher (disambiguation) =

John Fisher, 1st Baron Fisher (1841–1920) was a British Admiral of the Fleet. Admiral Fisher may also refer to:

- Charles W. Fisher Jr. (1880–1971), U.S. Navy rear admiral
- Douglas Fisher (Royal Navy officer) (1890–1963), British Royal Navy admiral
- Frederic Fisher (1851–1943), British Royal Navy admiral
- William Fisher (Royal Navy officer, born 1780) (1780–1852), British Royal Navy rear admiral
- William Blake Fisher (1853–1926), British Royal Navy admiral
- William Wordsworth Fisher (1875–1937), British Royal Navy admiral

== See also ==
- Olfert Fas Fischer (1700–1761), Royal Dano-Norwegian Navy vice admiral
- Olfert Fischer (1747–1829), Royal Dano-Norwegian Navy vice admiral
