= Cantabile (disambiguation) =

Cantabile is a musical term meaning literally "singable" or "songlike".

Cantabile may also refer to:

- Cantabile (group), a British a cappella vocal quartet
- Cantabile (symphonic suite), a work by Frederik Magle
- Liuto cantabile, a ten-stringed mandocello
- The Seasons: Park Bo-gum's Cantabile, seventh season of The Seasons hosted by Park Bo-gum
- Cantabile (poetry collection), a collection of poems by Henrik, the Prince Consort of Denmark
