= The Land of Heart's Desire =

1894 play by William Butler Yeats

- Original language: English
- Written by: William Butler Yeats
- Genre: Myth
- Setting: County Sligo, Late 18th century

Premiere
- Date: 29 March 1894
- Place: Avenue Theatre, London

The Land of Heart's Desire is a play by the Irish poet and dramatist William Butler Yeats. First performed in the spring of 1894, at the Avenue Theatre in London, where it ran for a little over six weeks, it was the first professional performance of one of Yeats' plays.

== Summary ==
In this theatrical lament on age and thwarted aspirations, a faery child encounters the newlyweds Shawn and Maire Bruin at their home, shared with Maurteen Bruin and Bridget Bruin, Shawn's parents. The child, who at first is thought of by the Bruins as of gentle birth, denounces God and shocks Father Hart. She expounds on the ephemeral nature of life, in a bid to entice the newly-wed Maire to leave with her to the world of faery:

You shall go with me, newly-married bride,
And gaze upon a merrier multitude.
White-armed Nuala, Aengus of the Birds,
Feacra of the hurtling foam, and him
Who is the ruler of the Western Host,
Finvarra, and their Land of Heart's Desire,
Where beauty has no ebb, decay no flood,
But joy is wisdom, Time an endless song.
I kiss you and the world begins to fade.

Shawn implores the previously listless Maire to remain in the real world, but she dies in his arms, surrendering herself to the laughter and eternal, youthful dance of the otherworld, and to the seductive draw of immortality and mindless joy.

== Characters ==
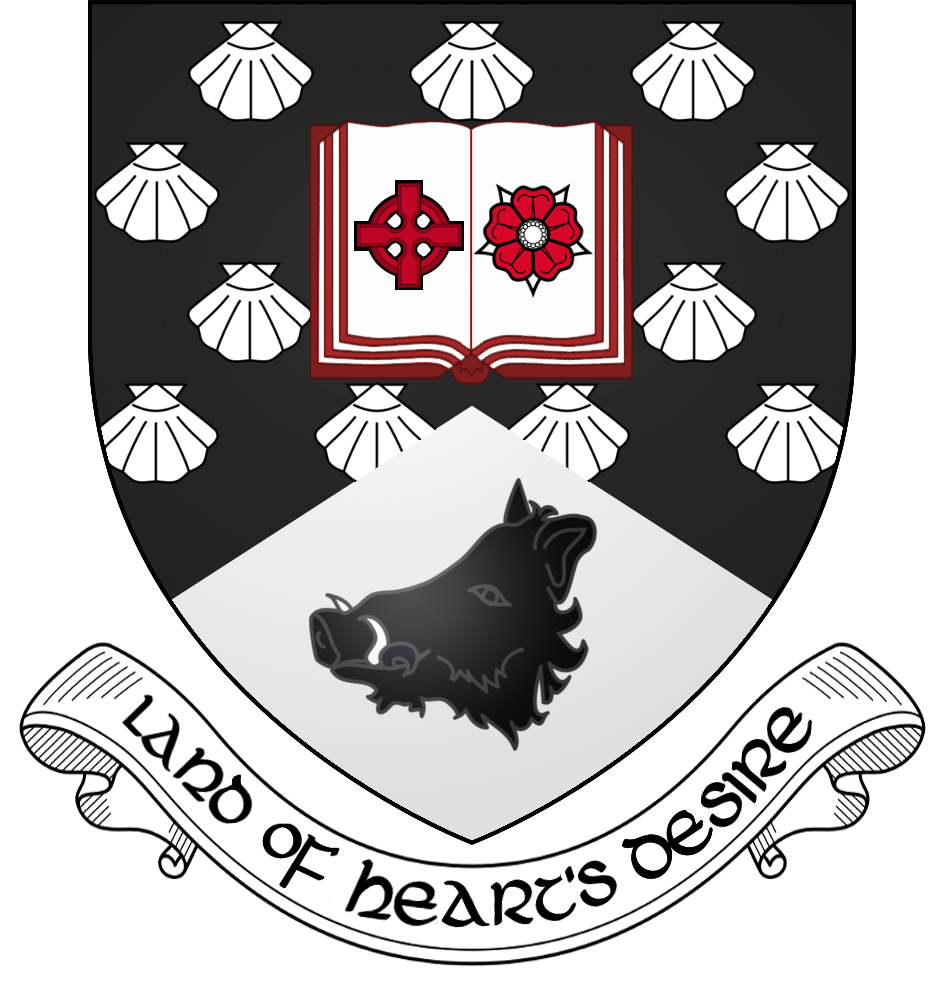
"Land of Heart's Desire" inscribed on County Sligo's coat of arms

- Maurteen Bruin
- Shawn Bruin
- Father Hart
- Bridget Bruin
- Maire Bruin
- A Faery Child

== Influence ==
The play's title is included on the coat of arms of County Sligo, Ireland; where the play is set. The county featured in many of his earlier works and, in accordance with his wishes, Yeats was re-buried in 1948 at Drumcliff, a village overlooked by Ben Bulben.

The title of the album Like a Flame by Frederik Magle is derived from a quote from The Land of Heart's Desire.
