= The Hope (Magle) =

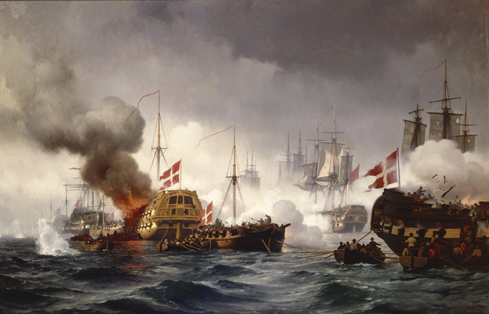
The Battle of Copenhagen. Painting by Carl Neumann

The Hope (Danish: Håbet) is a work for brass band, percussion, choir, and organ written in 2001 by Frederik Magle, depicting the Battle of Copenhagen in 1801. It consists of two movements with the first being purely instrumental. The choir enters in the second movement using text from Psalm 27.

The music was commissioned by the Admiral Danish Fleet (Royal Danish Navy Operational Command) for the 200th anniversary of the battle in 2001. The Hope also commemorates Olfert Fischer (Commander of the Danish fleet in 1801) who lies buried in the Reformed Church, Copenhagen, where the first performance of the work took place on April 1, 2001, with the Royal Danish Navy Band, the choir of the Reformed church, and Frederik Magle himself on organ.

The Hope is not pure program music, but includes highly visual elements in the description of the battle. The percussion is placed both in front and behind the audience, creating a special effect when the bass drum, sounding from behind the audience, is answered by cymbals in front - and the other way round - backwards and forwards above the audience, »as if cannon balls are flying over their heads«.

Frederik Magle has said of his thoughts behind the music:

»In the music I did not wish to glorify the bloodshed of the battlefield, but rather to depict it through the music; above all the work ends with a hope for peace.«

The Hope was released on the album Søværnet Ønsker God Vind (The Royal Danish Navy Wishes Godspeed) in 2005 with the Royal Danish Navy Band. The album was published by the Danish Navy.

== Instrumentation ==
The work is scored for

- Brass band with 4 Trumpets or Cornets, 1 Flugelhorn, 1 or 2 French horns, 2 Trombones, 1 Euphonium, and 2 Tubas
- 5 Percussionists
- Timpani
- Mixed choir (SATB)
- Organ

There is also a version for 4 (or more) cornets, 1 flugelhorn, 3 tenor horns, 2 baritones, 2 trombones, 1 bass trombone, 1 euphonium, 2 tubas, 5 percussionists, timpani, choir, and organ.

The Hope is published by Edition Wilhelm Hansen
