= Musica Humana Research =

Musica Humana Research is a collaboration between art, music and medical research.

The idea behind this project was the creation of a specially composed and designed music for treatment of hospitalized patients and was initiated by Professor M.D. Lars Heslet Copenhagen University Hospital and the composer and oboist Niels Eje during the nineties. In 1998 the Egmont Foundation granted economic support to complete the project.

The Egmont Foundation grant (1998–2003) was primarily aimed at developing a special composed music programme targeted at improving the sound environment in intensive care and recovery wards at a number of hospitals in Denmark.

This specially designed music was to be created by composer Niels Eje and according to the grant foundation, implemented and scientifically validated by a group of researchers affiliated to the project. The goal was to actively use specially designed music to improve patient wellbeing and satisfaction during hospitalisation, reduce anxiety and stress, and also improve the patients ability to recover.

Since 2001 Musica Humana Research has carried out many activities, including publishing and drawing attention to the research results and how to improve the sound environment for patients in hospitals. The activities includes articles in medical journals, presentations at conferences and symposiums all over the world.

Musica Humana Research has since 2003 become an international network of independent researchers, achieving positive and documented results with clinical trials in Denmark, Sweden, Norway and United States.
