= Cantabile (poetry collection) =

2000 collection of poems by Henrik, the Prince Consort of Denmark

Cantabile is a collection of poems written by Henrik, the Prince Consort of Denmark and published in 2000. It is illustrated by the Queen of Denmark, Margrethe II.

The book contains both the original poems by Prince Henrik, written in French, as well as Danish translations by Per Aage Brandt.

== Musical settings ==
- Lacrymae mundi for male choir by Svend Hvidtfelt Nielsen (2008)
- Symphonic suite Cantabile for symphony orchestra, choir and soloists by Frederik Magle (2004–2009)
