= Olfert Fischer =

Danish naval officer

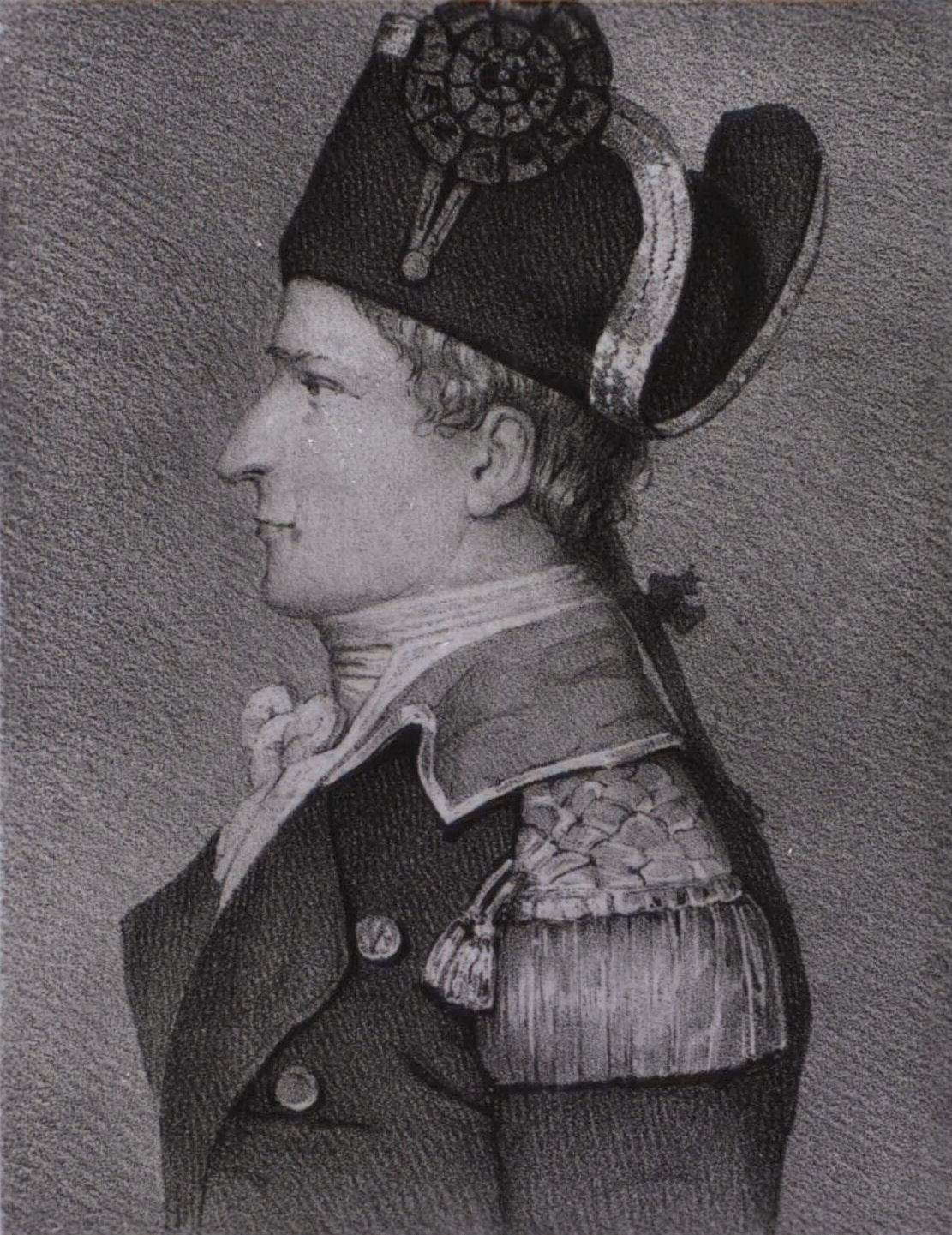
- Lithograph of Fischer
- Born: 4 August 1747; Copenhagen, Denmark
- Died: 18 February 1829 (aged 81); Copenhagen, Denmark
- Burial place: Reformed Church
- Relatives: Olfert Fas Fischer (father)
- Military career
- Allegiance: Denmark–Norway
- Branch: Royal Dano-Norwegian Navy
- Rank: Vice admiral
- Conflicts: War of the Second Coalition; Battle of Copenhagen

Vice-Admiral Johan Olfert Fischer (4 August 1747 – 18 February 1829) was a Danish naval officer. He commanded the Dano-Norwegian fleet against British forces under Lord Nelson during the Danish defeat at Copenhagen on 2 April 1801.

== Life and career ==
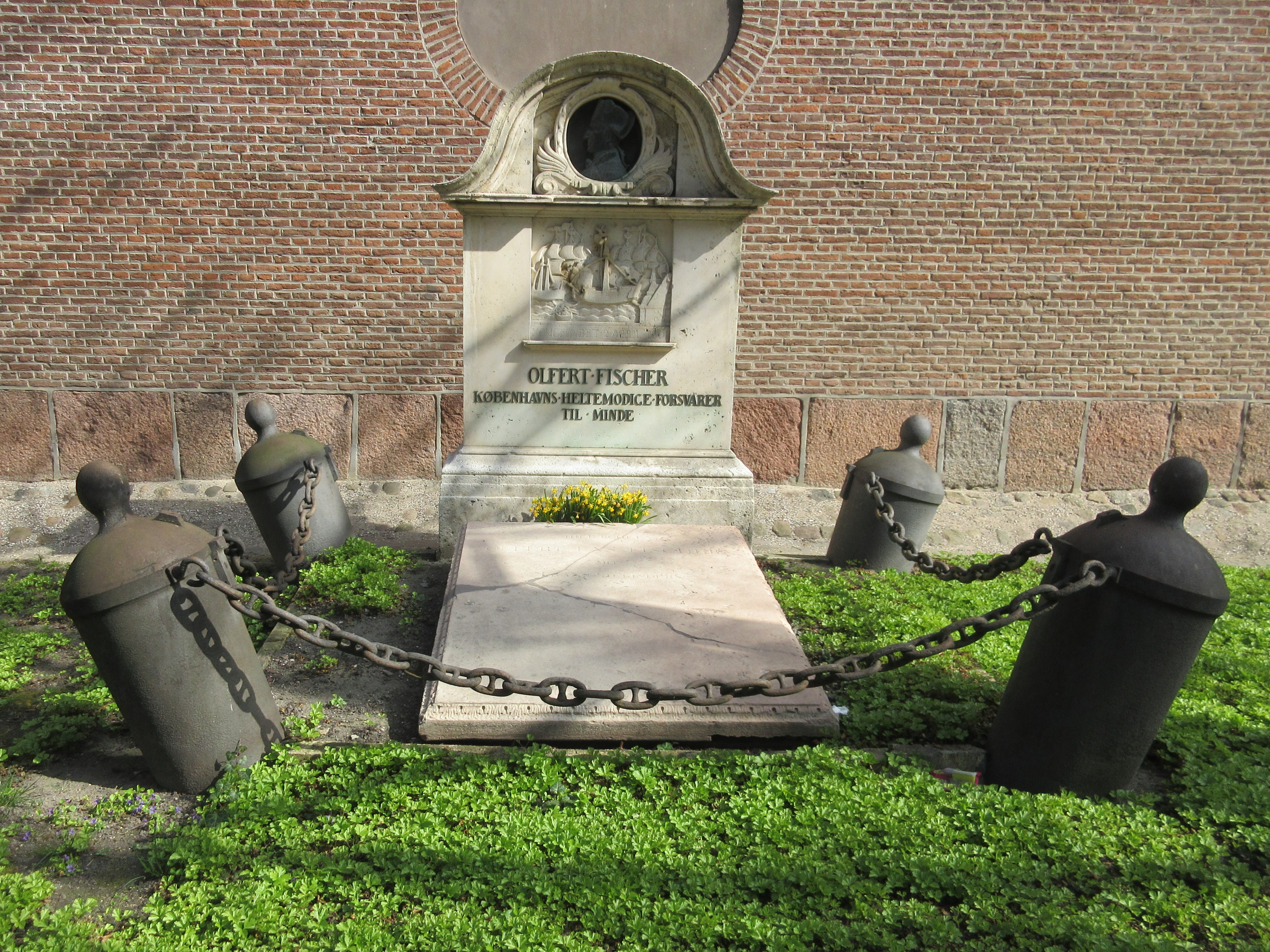
Fischer's grave, as seen from the street Åbenrå

Johan Olfert Fischer was born in Copenhagen in 1747, the son of Vice-Admiral Olfert Fas Fischer whom he followed to a naval career. While still a young man, his rise through the military ranks was set back and almost destroyed in an incident with a prostitute while he was on guard duty on the island of Holmen off Copenhagen. The prostitute compounded Fischer's disgrace by accusing him of violent assault and her charges were believed by a military court: Fischer, then a lieutenant, was punished and demoted back to common seaman for a period of one year.

By 1784, however, Fischer had rebuilt his reputation enough to be promoted to captain, and he was dispatched to the West Indies as commander of the warship Bornholme. It was during this three-year mission that he first met — on friendly terms — his future foe Nelson, then a captain aboard HMS Boreas.

=== Battle of Copenhagen ===
By 1801, Fischer had risen to the rank of commodore and was appointed to lead the critical naval defense of Copenhagen during the French Revolutionary Wars. Aboard his flagship Dannebrog, he attempted to organize a comprehensive defense with which to face Nelson's fleet. The Dannebrog, however, caught fire early in the battle and Fischer was forced to transfer his command, first to a different ship and then, when that ship was crippled also, to a shore-based battery. Under these circumstances, Fischer had little control over the situation. Though the Danish fleet fought a spirited battle, the much larger British force eventually overwhelmed the Danish fleet. Recent histories have posited the difficulty of battle communications and a cumbersome Danish chain of command as reasons for the British victory in the battle."

=== Later life ===
Fischer, who was wounded in the battle, was praised as a national hero and bemedaled by the Danish crown for his bravery. Nelson himself, who had at that time been involved in over a hundred actions, pronounced that the battle was the fiercest he had ever fought.

Fischer remained with the navy and was elevated to the rank of Vice Admiral. He died on 18 February 1829 and was buried in the churchyard of the Reformed Church, Copenhagen.

== Legacy ==
Although some contemporary scholars have criticized Fischer's reputation and minimized his significance, he remains a military hero in Denmark. Among ships named for him, the coastal defense monitor Olfert Fischer was one of the main ships of the Royal Danish Navy (RDN) before World War I. It was first laid down at Copenhagen in 1900 and commissioned to service in 1903. The vessel took part in the coronation celebrations of King George V in June 1911, representing Denmark at the naval ceremonies in Spithead. The modern Olfert Fischer (F355) is a Niels Juel-class corvette of the RDN, commissioned to service in 1981. In addition to coastal duties, this ship served among allied forces in the Persian Gulf during the conflicts of 1990 and 2003.

Fischer is commemorated in the composition The Hope by Frederik Magle which was commissioned by the Admiral Danish Fleet and the Reformed Church in Copenhagen. The Hope was premiered on 1 and 2 April 2001, marking the 200th anniversary of the battle of Copenhagen.
