= Like a Flame =

Live album by Frederik Magle
- Released: December 2010
- Recorded: December 22–23, 2009
- Genre: Contemporary classical / Organ improvisation
- Label: Proprius Music

Like a Flame is a double-album with free improvisations for organ by Frederik Magle released in December 2010 on the Swedish record label Proprius Music (PRCD 2061). It was recorded on the then new Frobenius pipe organ in Jørlunde church on December 22–23, 2009. Frederik Magle recorded a total of 60 free improvisations over the course of the two days and later selected 23 to be released on the double album. The improvisations was recorded in one take.

The album has been mostly favorably reviewed, but also been criticized and caused some debate about the nature of improvisation with the reviewers of Danish magazine Orglet and Danish Organist's Society (DOKS) magazine Organistbladet arguing for the use of traditional fugal and choral forms as well as stylistic copies of Johann Sebastian Bach when improvising and on the other hand organist, jazz-pianist, and composer Henrik Sørensen defending the free improvisational form on Like a Flame in an article in Danish organ-magazine Orgelforum.

== Origin of the title ==
The title of the album (and the title track) is derived from a quote from the Irish poet William Butler Yeats' play The Land of Heart's Desire:

Faeries, come take me out of this dull world,
For I would ride with you upon the wind,
Run on the top of the dishevelled tide,
And dance upon the mountains like a flame!

== Track listing ==
CD1:

1. Origin
2. Like a Flame
3. Fleeting Glimpses
4. Towards Truth
5. A Temptation
6. Merry-go-round
7. Awakening
8. Awake
9. To Become
10. Realization
11. Truth

CD2:

1. Odditorium
2. Through the Mist
3. Crossing Borders
4. Dreams of Childhood Dreams
5. Memories of Meadows
6. Behind the Mask
7. Empty Fair
8. Lament
9. Journey Forever
10. Destiny
11. Ascending
12. End of the Circle
