= Monica Ritterband =

Danish artist

Monica Ritterband (born 26 August 1955) is a Danish artist, who previously worked as a journalist and speaker.

Ritterband is the daughter of two Holocaust survivors; artist Olly Ritterband and Daniel Ritterband, who were originally from Transylvania, Romania. Ritterband graduated from the Gammel Hellerup Gymnasium and was later trained as a journalist at the Danish School of Journalism. She worked as a journalist for Ekstra Bladet and Weekendavisen and was a presenter at the DR's TV news for several years. In 1990, she became CEO of Carlsberg Group. Since 1997, she has devoted herself to her art full-time.

Among Ritterband's artistic works are several candlesticks for the Holmegaard, a porcelain series Musica for Royal Copenhagen, tablecloths from Georg Jensen Damask and carpets for Egetæpper, a Danish carpet design and manufacturing company, but she has also designed larger works of art; there are a series of stainless steel sculptures in the former municipality of Farum.

Monica Ritterband edited the book Flammer for Frihed (Flames for Freedom), dedicated to Amnesty International which contained music from Frederik Magle and essays by 24 Danes (including then prime minister Poul Nyrup Rasmussen, former prime minister Poul Schlüter, Tøger Seidenfaden, Ghita Nørby, and others) and was published on the occasion of the 50th anniversary of the Universal Declaration of Human Rights.

Ritterband has been named Artist of the Year in Denmark four times.
