= Niels Eje =

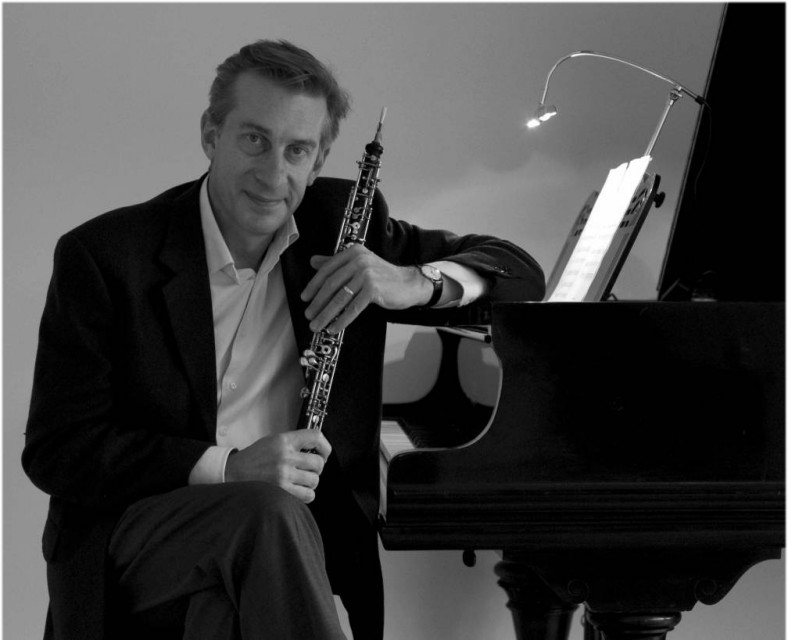
Niels Eje, composer and oboist, 2008

Niels Eje (born 1954) is a Danish composer and oboist.

== Early life ==
Niels Eje was born in Copenhagen and was educated at the Carl Nielsen Academy of Music from 1974 to 1979. Thereafter he studied with Lothar Koch of the Berlin Philharmonic.

== Career ==
His career included a position as principal oboist in the Danish National Symphony Orchestra, (1979 to 1990) performances in Europe, USA and Japan as soloist and chamber musician.

Niels Eje has composed and arranged a large repertoire for different classical ensembles as well as music for concerts, theatre, TV and documentaries. He is the founder of Trio Rococo (harp, Berit Spaelling, oboe Niels Eje, and cello, Inge Mulvad,) whose album 'Norwegian Wood' was released worldwide.

Niels Eje has participated on several recordings with various artists in a number of genres, including with Miles Davis on the album Aura, and with Niels-Henning Ørsted Pedersen, Berit Spaelling, Inge Mulvad in the album In the Name of Music

In 1998 Niels Eje founded the interdisciplinary project Musica Humana Research together with Professor Lars Heslet, Copenhagen University Hospital. The research projects were aimed at creating a new specially designed music environment in hospitals and with scientific methods documenting the effect. The music and research documentation is published under the name MusiCure.

== Grants & Awards ==
- Jacob Gade Grant
- Børge Schrøder and Herta Finnerups grant for special achievements in music
- The "Jante Knuser Cultural Award" 2001 for best entrepreneur activity in the field of "cultural business" idea in Denmark - given to Niels Eje by the Ministry of Economic and Business Affairs, Denmark.
- Gold Award for the Trio Rococo recording "Classical Mystery Tour/Norwegian Wood"
- 2007 Blair Sadler Award

== Selected list of works ==
- Faries and Tales dedicated to James Galway and Safri Duo
- Pip’s Theme, from Great Expectations by Charles Dickens for oboe, cello, harp and electronics
- Biddy, from Great Expectations, violin/flute and piano
- Miss HavishamHouse, violin, harp and electronics
- Estella, violin, cello, harp
- Fragile Light, oboe, cello, harp and electronics( Trio Rococo)
- Infinity, oboe, cello and harp (Trio Rococo)
- Asian Echoes, oboe, cello and harp (trio Rococo)
- Sakhalin Fantasy, flute, oboe, cello and piano
- The Power of The Harp, harp solo ( Berit Spaelling)
- Ablaze suite The Vikings Large ensemble and soprano
- Sakura suite Japanese folk songs for piano and wind quintet
- Octoman, wind octet
- Oboe in Orbit, oboe and electronics
- The Storyteller, large ensemble and electronics
- Great Expectations suite, after Dickens (Ablaze)
- More than 30 titles for the Musica Humana research project

== Discography ==
=== With Trio Rococo ===
- 1988: Sonata and Divertimenti: Wolfgang Amadeus Mozart arranged by Niels Eje
- 1991: Crystal Bridge, Music by Chick Corea, Palle Mikkelborg, Thomas Clausen and Niels Eje
- 1992: Trio Rococo plays Rococo Trios. Music by Johann Wilhelm Hertel and Carl Philipp Emanuel Bach, arranged by Niels Eje
- 1992: Hexerie eller Blind Alarm (stage music) – Music by Niels Eje (cassette)
- 1994: Classical Mystery Tour, Trio Rococo plays The Beatles Gefion Records GFO 20112
- 1994: Sangen er et Eventyr (The song is a fairy-tale), Music by Frederik Magle – feat. Trio Rococo (arranged by Niels Eje), NHØP, and others
- 1996: Friends Music by Brian Wilson, Paul Simon and Niels Eje. Gefion Records GFO 20120
- 1998: In The Name Of Music, Trio Rococo and NHØP. Gefion Records 3672634848639
- 2001: No Time At All – Michael Vesterskov (‘Bromzkij Garden’)
- 2002: Den danske sang til hver en tid (Danish Songs), Tritonus Choir & Trio Rococo. Arranged by John Höybye and Niels Eje. Exlibris

=== Niels Eje ===
- 1993: Pride of The Ocean (single) – Music by Niels Eje
- 1997: Ablaze, Music by Niels Eje, Gefion Records GFO 2012

=== With Selandia Wind Ensemble ===
- 1989: Wind Chamber Music I – Danish and French composers
- 1990: Wind Chamber Music II – W.A. Mozart
- 1992: Wind Chamber Music III – Bach & Villa-Lobos
- 1999: Wind Chamber Music IV – Carl Nielsen

=== With Solisti Pro Musica ===
- 1990: Sonatas & Arias – J. S. Bach
- 2005: Klassisk Jul – Merete Hjortsø – (Niels Eje: oboe & arrangement.)

=== MusiCure ===
Music composed and produced by Niels Eje and Inge Mulvad Eje:

- 2003: MusiCure 1. The Journey
- 2003: MusiCure 2. Equator
- 2004: MusiCure 3. Fairy Tales
- 2004: MusiCure 4. Northern Light
- 2005: MusiCure 5. Seasons
- 2006: MusiCure 6. Waves
- 2007: MusiCure 7. Horizons
- 2008: MusiCure 8. Peace
- 2009: MusiCure 9. Scandinavia
- 2010: MusiCure 10. Dreams
- 2011: MusiCure Nature Editions (2-CD set)
- 2013: MusiCure Moonlight & Nature Meditation (2-CD set)

=== Other CD releases where Niels Eje appears (selected) ===
- 1985: Aura: Columbia Records, COL 463351 2, Miles Davis. Danish Radio Big Band. Conductor and composer: Palle Mikkelborg.
- 1990: Homage/Once Upon a Time – NHØP/Mikkelborg
- 1993: Kærlighedens Triumf (stage music) – Arranged by Niels Eje (cassette)
- 1995: The musical Atlantis – Peter Spies et al. (oboe solo on Morgen på Atlantis)
- 1995: Du Kan Få Mig Til Alt – Lis Sørensen and Stig Kreutzfeldt (solo on ‘Vågen I Drømmeland’)
- 1997: Michael Brydenfelt, Trompet – (Niels Eje soloist in J.S. Bach Brandenburg Concerto no. 2)
- 1999: Imprints – by Jan Lippert
- 2001: Misty Paradise – Hanne Boel
- 2001: King of Nothing – Henrik Andersen
- 2006: Vores Bedste – Danser med Drenge, and others
