= Olfert Fas Fischer =

- Nickname: Fas
- Born: Olfert Fasvier Fischer; 14 March 1700
- Died: 7 December 1761 (aged 61) Copenhagen, Denmark
- Buried: Reformed Church
- Allegiance: Denmark–Norway
- Branch: Royal Dano-Norwegian Navy
- Service years: 1712–1761
- Rank: Vice-Admiral
- Conflicts: Great Northern War
- Spouses: Sidsel Marie Hassel (m. 1720; died 1737); Anna Ackerman (m. 1738)
- Children: 13, including Johan Olfert

Vice-Admiral Olfert Fasvier Fischer (14 March 1700 – 7 December 1761) was a Royal Dano-Norwegian Navy officer. In addition to serving in the navy, he also became a director of the Danish Asia Company and ended his career as a vice admiral.

== Personal life ==
Born on 14 March 1700, Olfert Fasvier Fischer (his middle name was often abbreviated to Fas) was the son of the Dutch skipper and merchant Olfert Vaese who had settled in Copenhagen with his wife Alida Brunsman. He married twice,

- in 1720 to Sidsel Marie Hassel who died in 1737. Neither her year of birth nor any children are recorded.
- and in 1738 with his second wife Anna Ackerman, the 18-year-old daughter of a wine merchant, with whom he had ten daughters and three sons. Of the three sons all joined the navy, but two died young including Friderich Gerhart Fischer who was lost when his ship foundered in the Atlantic. (Note: His son, Friderich Gerhart Fischer (born 1756) had sailed with the frigate Perlen to Iceland in 1776, to the Mediterranean with the frigate Bornholm in 1779, and with the ship-of-the-line Indfødsretten to Tranquebar in 1782. It was on the return voyage from India in 1783 that his ship was lost with all hands. Some wreckage washed ashore in Southern Ireland the following year.)
  The third son was Johan Olfert Fischer who also became a Vice Admiral.

In 1745 the manor house of Marienborg at Lyngby, just north of Copenhagen, was built for Olfert Fas Fischer. Today it is the official residence of the Danish Prime Minister.

== Career ==
As a cadet from the age of twelve, Fisker served under Andreas Rosenpalm in the Great Northern War until, in 1719 he was commissioned as a junior lieutenant. In 1715 he was with the small ship Cronen in the Pommeranian flotilla and quartered at Greifswalde in January and February 1716. In 1717 he served in the ship-of-the-line Lovise and in 1719 in the frigate Raae. From 1720 to 1722 he was employed on merchant ships based in Norway and was regularly employed thereafter. (Note: Although he became a director of the Danish Asia Company later in his career, there is no indication in the references given that he ever sailed to the East Indies or Asia)
Promoted to senior lieutenant in 1725, he was second in command of the gunboat Friderichshald in the squadron, and the following year served in the ship-of-the-line Slesvig with the Danish squadron which, together with a Royal Navy squadron, blockaded the Russian fleet in Reval (modern day Tallinn) in 1726.
In 1728 he was granted four months leave of absence to travel privately to Norway.

1732 saw his promotion to captain-lieutenant, serving on the ship-of-the-line Prindsesse Charlotte Amalie and the following year to full Captain. In 1739 he became a director of the Danish Asia Company, a post he held until 1752. In 1743 he was in command of the ship-of-the-line Oldenburg (Note: The Oldenburg was the flagship of U.A. Dannesjold-Samsøe which, together with Sydermanland, Delmenhorst and Falster saw duty in the Mediterranean in 1746)
Rising in seniority and rank to Commodore in 1747, Fas Fischer sat on several commissions at the Danish admiralty including the Rigging Commission in 1749, and in 1751 on both the Defence Commission and that reviewing the Articles of War. In the year before he was promoted to flag rank, he was appointed as a deputy at the Danish admiralty.
Following promotion to rear admiral in 1755 he became, in 1756, interim head of the Holmen dockyard and then, in 1758, commander of a squadron convoying large troop transports from Norway and Denmark to Eckenførde in Schleswig-Holstein. (Note: Flying his flag in the ship-of-the-line Kjøbenhavn he escorted the 8th battalion of infantry (5150 men, plus families) from Norway to the Duchies in June 1758. During this operation, two ships-of-the-line in his squadron ran aground on Saltholm and were refloated only with difficulty. Then in July and August the 12th battalion was moved from Copenhagen to Eckenførde.)
It was also in 1758 that Fischer was promoted to vice admiral.

== Death and pensions ==
He died on 7 December 1761 in Copenhagen and was buried in the cemetery of the German Reformed Church, Copenhagen.

His widow sought a pension from the admiralty for herself and the nine children (two sons and seven daughters) who were still minors - the youngest still a babe-in-arms. This was granted in the sum of 300 Rigs dollar annually, and on the death of their mother twenty years later the six remaining unmarried daughters received a single supplementary payment of 30 Rdl.

== Citations ==
- Partial translation from Danish Wikipedia da:Olfert Fas Fischer, augmented and checked by references given.
- Blumensaadt & Ingemand - Vores Slægt (lineage website) - Sidsel Marie Hassel
- Project Runeberg - C. With on Olvert Fas Fischer in Danish Biographical Lexicon Volume 5 pages 177-178
- Royal Danish Naval Museum - List of Ships
- Royal Danish Naval Museum - Skibregister for record cards on most individual ships
- (in Danish)Project Runeberg: C With on Olfert Fas Fischer in DBL Vol 5 pages 177 -178
- (in Danish)Topsøe-Jensen, H.: Olfert Fas Fischer in Dansk Biografisk Leksikon at lex.dk. accessed 15. June 2020
- (in Danish)T. A. Topsøe-Jensen og Emil Marquard (1935) "Officerer i den dansk-norske Søetat 1660-1814 og den danske Søetat 1814-1932". Volume 1 and Volume 2
