= Prince Henrik of Denmark =

Consort of Margrethe II from 1972 to 2018

Prince Henrik
- Prince Consort; Count of Monpezat
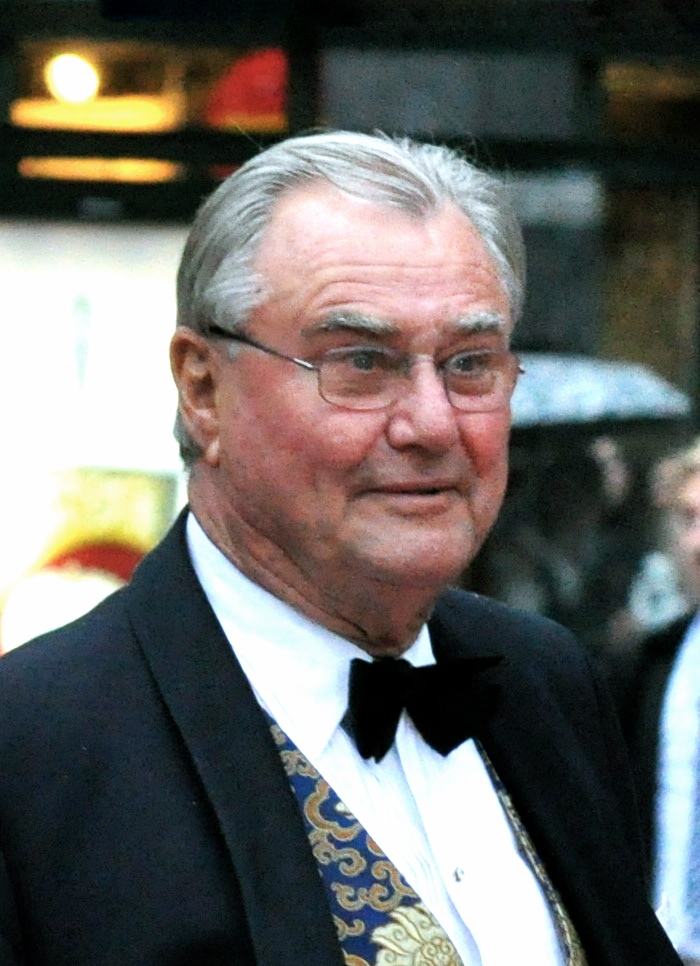
- Henrik in 2010

Consort of the Danish monarch
- Tenure: 14 January 1972 – 13 February 2018
- Born: Henri Marie Jean André de Laborde de Monpezat; 11 June 1934; Talence, France
- Died: 13 February 2018 (aged 83); Fredensborg Palace, Denmark
- Burial: 20 February 2018; Ashes partly scattered across Danish seas, partly interred in the private gardens of Fredensborg Palace
- Spouse: Margrethe II (m. 1967)
- Issue: Frederik X; Prince Joachim
- Family: de Laborde de Monpezat
- Father: André de Laborde de Monpezat
- Mother: Renée Yvonne Doursenot
- Military career
- Allegiance: France (1959–1962); Denmark
- Branch: French Army; Royal Danish Army; Royal Danish Navy; Royal Danish Air Force
- Service years: 1959–1962 (France)
- Rank: General (À la suite); Admiral (À la suite)
- Conflicts: Algerian War
- Awards: Mentioned in dispatches; Order of the Elephant; Order of the Legion of Honour

Prince Henrik of Denmark, Count of Monpezat (Danish: [ˈhenˀʁek]; born Henri Marie Jean André de Laborde de Monpezat; (Note: French pronunciation: [ɑ̃ʁi də labɔʁd də mɔ̃pəza]) 11 June 1934 – 13 February 2018) was the husband of Margrethe II of Denmark. He served as her royal consort from Margrethe's accession on 14 January 1972 until his death in 2018.

Henrik was born in the French commune of Talence near Bordeaux to an old French family, the Laborde de Monpezats. He spent his early years in Tonkin in French Indochina (now part of Vietnam), where his family had lived for many years. The family spent the Second World War at the family home in Cahors, France. They returned to French Indochina after the war. However, they were forced to flee following the defeat of the French in the First Indochina War. After completing his education in France and Vietnam, Henrik served in the French Army during the Algerian War. Prior to his marriage to Margrethe, he worked in the diplomatic service. He married Margrethe at the Holmen Church on 10 June 1967 and became her prince consort when she succeeded her father, King Frederik IX, as monarch of Denmark on 14 January 1972.

He had two sons, King Frederik X (born 1968) and Prince Joachim (born 1969), and eight grandchildren. Throughout his time as prince consort, Henrik voiced his displeasure with never being granted the title of king. A keen winemaker, Henrik produced his own wine at his estate in France. He also published many works of poetry. He was the first male consort to a Danish monarch. Henrik retired from his royal duties on 1 January 2016, at the age of 81. He died at Fredensborg Palace on 13 February 2018, after a short illness.

== Early life ==
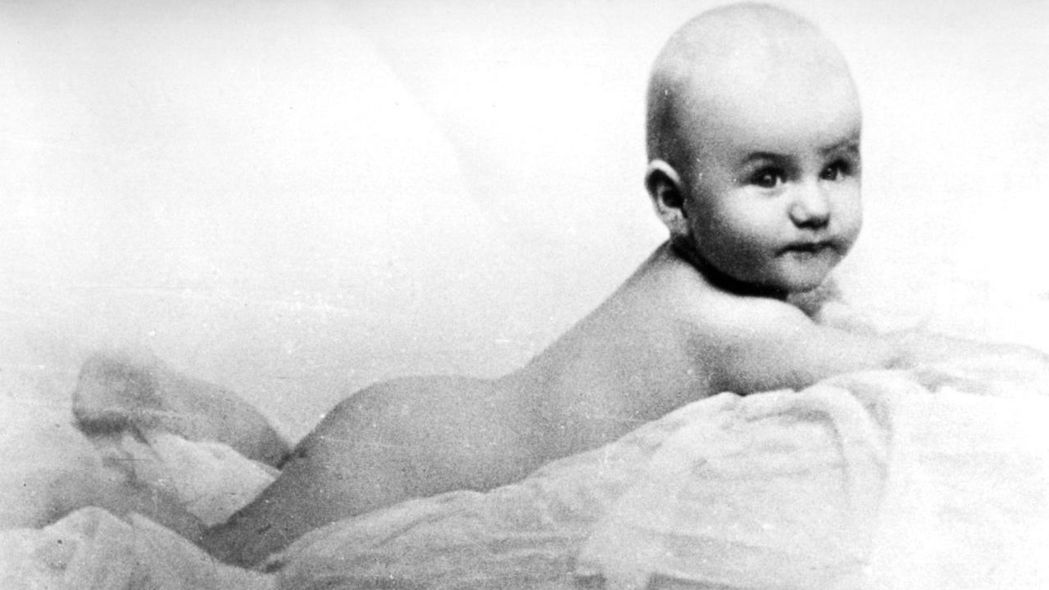
Henrik as a baby in 1934–35

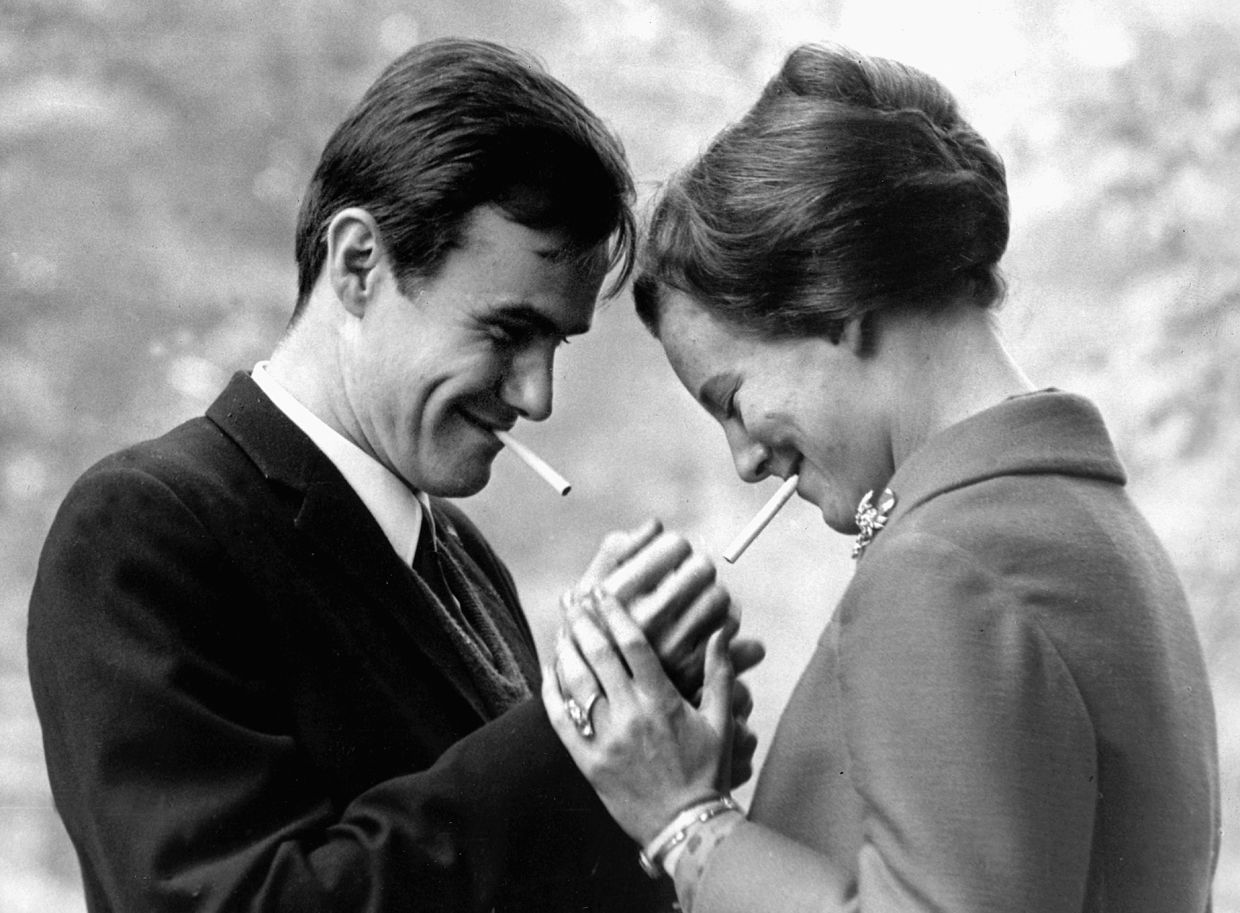
Henrik lighting a cigarette for Margrethe, 1966

Henrik was born on 11 June 1934 in Talence, Gironde, France. He was the son of André de Laborde de Monpezat (6 May 1907 in Mont-de-Marsan – 23 February 1998 in Le Cayrou) and his then-partner and future wife Renée-Yvonne Doursenot (24 October 1908 in Périgueux – 11 February 2001 in Le Cayrou), who was then married to Prof. Louis Leuret (1881–1962) whom she divorced only in 1940. André de Laborde de Monpezat and Renée Doursenot were married in 1948. He was the second of 9 children and eldest son. He had an older sister, Françoise (1932–2021); three younger brothers, Joseph "Jason" (1938–1957), Étienne (born 1942) and Jean-Baptiste (born 1944); and four younger sisters, Anne-Marie (1936–1938), Thérèse (1940–1959), Catherine (born 1946) and Maurille (1948–2015).

Henrik spent his first five years in Hanoi in Tonkin in French Indochina (now part of Vietnam), where his father looked after family business interests. In 1939, the family returned to Le Cayrou, where they remained during the Second World War. Henrik received homeschooling until 1947, when he went to a Jesuit school in Bordeaux. He returned to Hanoi in Tonkin in 1950, where increasing unrest forced him to fight the Việt Minh, to protect his family's lands. He graduated from the French secondary school in Hanoi in 1952. Originally wanting to study to become a pianist at Conservatoire de Paris, he instead chose an education more in line with his father's wishes. Between 1952 and 1957 he simultaneously studied law and political science at the Sorbonne, Paris, and Chinese and Vietnamese at the École Nationale des Langues Orientales (now known as INALCO). He also studied in Hong Kong in 1957 and Saigon in 1958.

He served as an infantry conscript in the French Army in the Algerian War between 1959 and 1962. He then joined the French Foreign Ministry, working as a Secretary at the embassy in London from 1963 to 1967. While there, he met Princess Margrethe, who was studying at the London School of Economics. The couple secretly dated for a year before Henrik proposed.

== Marriage ==
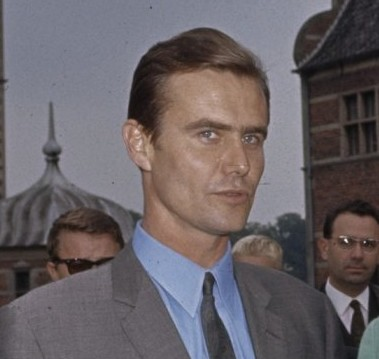
Henrik in 1966

On 10 June 1967, he married Margrethe, the heir presumptive to the Danish throne, at the Naval Church of Copenhagen. At the time of the wedding his name was Danicised to Henrik and he was given the title HRH Prince Henrik of Denmark. Prior to the wedding, he converted to Lutheranism from Catholicism. Margrethe and Henrik had two children, King Frederik X and Prince Joachim, and eight grandchildren.

Henrik's native language was French, and his second language was Danish. He also spoke fluent English, German, Chinese, and Vietnamese. Although he quickly learned Danish after marrying Margrethe and spoke it regularly for half a century, Danes joked about his grasp of Danish and his pronounced French accent.

== Difficulties with the Danish monarchy ==
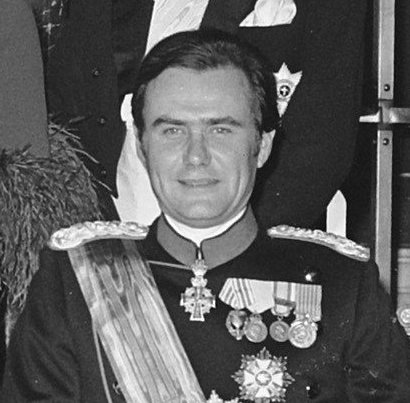
Henrik in 1975, as prince consort

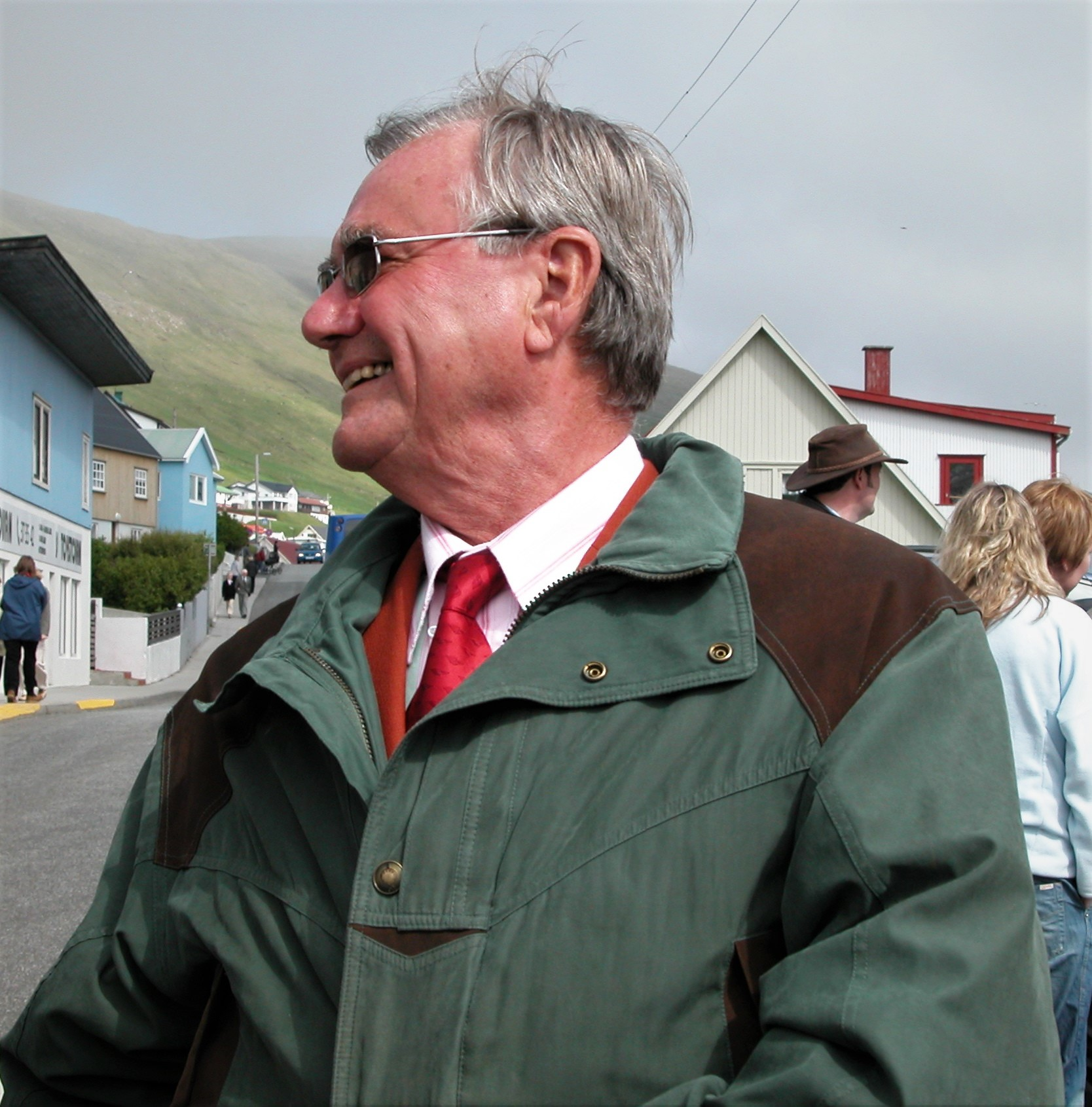
Prince Henrik in Vágur, Faroe Islands, 2005

When Queen Margrethe II ascended the throne, Henrik became the first male consort in Danish history. This meant there were no clear descriptions of his duties. He defined his own role as a supporter of and counsellor to the Queen. However, he felt frustrated with the lack of recognition in title, stating that there was no way to differentiate between his own title and those of his sons and grandsons.

In 2002, Prince Henrik fled Denmark for France and went to stay at the couple's Château de Cayx in Cahors in southern France. The cause of his departure from Denmark was a New Year's Day reception in which his son, Frederik, had been appointed as host in the absence of Queen Margrethe. Henrik felt "pushed aside, degraded and humiliated" by being relegated to "third place in the royal hierarchy".

"For many years, I have been Denmark's number two", he said. "I have been satisfied with that role, but I don't want to be relegated to number three after so many years." Henrik departed from Denmark to reflect on his status in the Danish Royal Family. Queen Margrethe flew to France to meet her husband. Henrik stressed that neither his wife nor son were to blame for the incident. The Prince Consort spent three weeks in Caix, and did not appear with his wife as expected at the wedding of Willem-Alexander of the Netherlands and Máxima Zorreguieta. After three weeks, Henrik returned to Denmark from France.

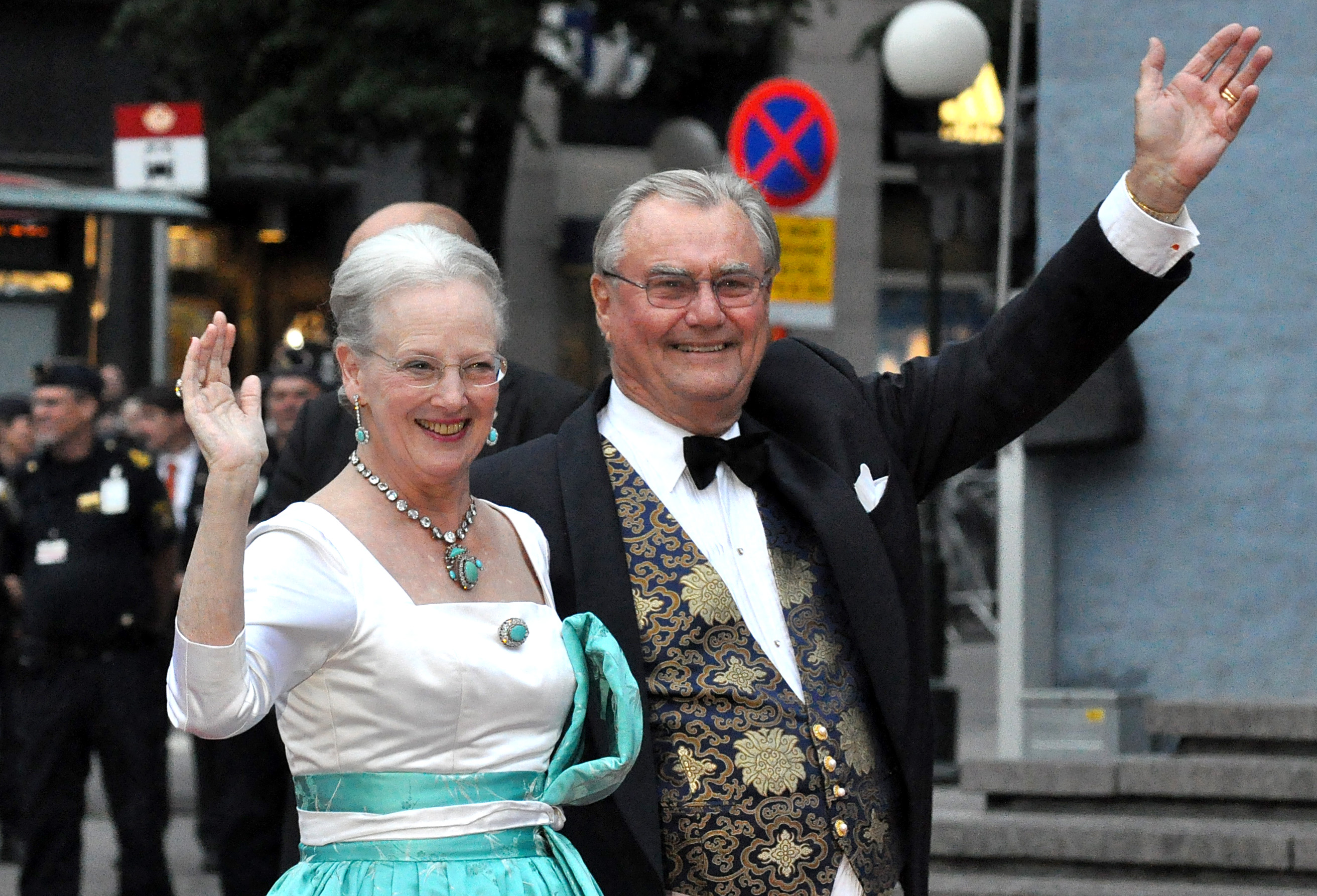
Prince Henrik with his wife Queen Margrethe II of Denmark in 2010

On 30 April 2008, shortly before the wedding of his younger son, Joachim, to Marie Cavallier, the Queen conferred the new Danish title "Count of Monpezat" (Danish: Greve af Monpezat) on both of her sons and made it hereditary for their male-line descendants, both male and female. The Queen's private secretary Henning Fode commented, "The Queen and the Prince Consort have considered this for quite some time, and it has led to the belief that it was the right thing to do." In fact, Henrik had mentioned this possibility as far back as 1996 in his published memoir: "During our generation, the future sovereign will perhaps receive approval to see 'Monpezat' added to the dynastic name of 'Oldenburg-Glücksburg'". While being interviewed by the French weekly Point de Vue in October 2005, Henrik raised the issue shortly after the birth of Frederik's first son, Prince Christian, who is expected to inherit the Danish crown one day: "It also makes him very proud and happy that Monpezat will be added to this small grandson's future name as Prince of Denmark. 'It is a great joy for me that his French roots will also be remembered.'"

In her New Year's speech to the Danish people on 31 December 2015, Queen Margrethe announced that Henrik would slow down and give up most of his official duties beginning on 1 January 2016. On 14 April 2016, Henrik renounced the title of Prince Consort, which he had been given in 2005.

== Cultural interests and hobbies ==
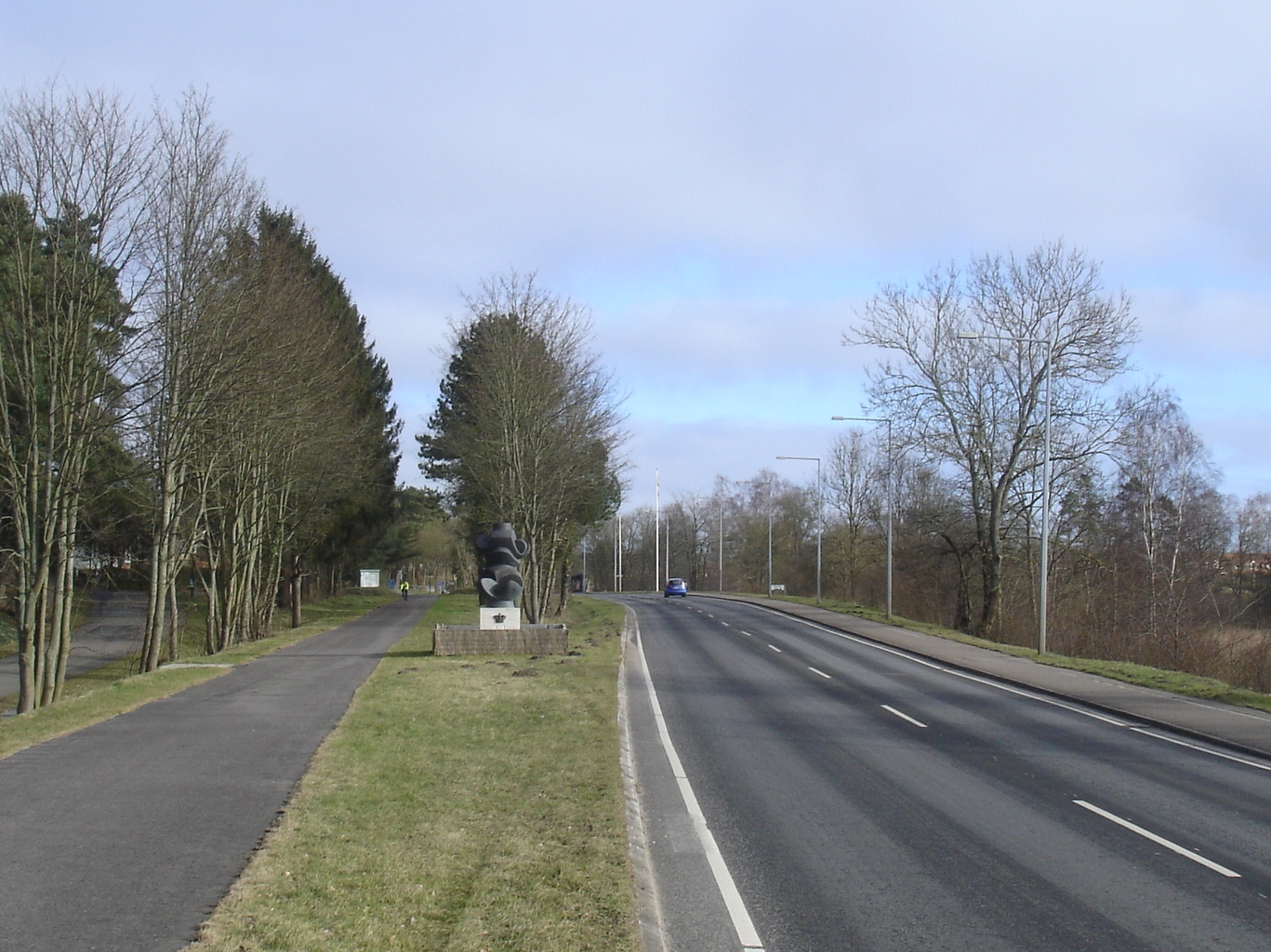
Sculpture made by Prince Henrik near a road

Like his wife, Henrik was deeply interested in art and culture. He was particularly fond of wooden figures and jade, building up collections which he exhibited in 2017 at the museum in Koldinghus. Although he never achieved his ambition of becoming a concert pianist, he continued to play the piano throughout his life. In 2013, he accompanied the pop group Michael Learns to Rock on the piano as they recorded "Echo", a number which was presented to King Rama IX of Thailand.

Henrik wrote many poems in his native French, some of which have been published in the collections Chemin faisant (1982), Cantabile (2000), Les escargots de Marie Lanceline (2003), Murmures de vent (2005), Frihjul (Roue-Libre, 2010), Fabula (2011), La part des anges (2013), and Dans mes nuits sereines (2014). The symphonic suite Cantabile by Frederik Magle is based on Henrik's poetry collection Cantabile and was premiered by the Danish National Symphony Orchestra at two concerts celebrating Henrik's 70th and 75th birthdays in 2004 and 2009. Henrik said about writing poetry (translated from Danish): "I see poetry as an opportunity for immersion in a superficial time dominated by news and entertainment that makes us rootless and restless. Poetry takes us closer to the true nature of the world, in poetry we can approach the eternal questions such as love, loneliness and death".

Henrik was also an excellent cook, inspired by French gastronomic traditions. He usually planned the family meals in collaboration with the court chef, always including his own spices on the table, some from his childhood estates in Asia. In addition to his cookbooks, Henrik often appeared in television programmes showing how he prepared meals in Fredensborg Castle in Denmark or at his French home, the Château de Cayx.

== Death ==
In August 2017, Henrik announced he did not wish to be buried next to the Queen, citing his longstanding complaint of only being named Prince Consort, and not King Consort. The decision is said to have broken a tradition that began in 1559, and at the time, Queen Margrethe is said to have accepted her husband's decision.

On 6 September 2017, it was announced that Henrik was suffering from dementia. On 28 January 2018, he was hospitalised at Rigshospitalet following a visit to Egypt. It was later revealed that he had a benign tumor in the left lung. However, his health worsened, causing Frederik to cut short his visit to South Korea where he was about to attend the 2018 Winter Olympics in Pyeongchang. On 13 February 2018, Henrik was transferred from Rigshospitalet to Fredensborg Palace, where the Danish Royal Court stated he wished to spend the remainder of his life. The Royal Court added that the condition of Henrik remained serious. He died later that day, surrounded by his family.

Following his death, the Court announced a month of royal mourning. Henrik's casket was placed in The Palace Chapel at Christiansborg for a castrum doloris, where in the following two days, more than 19,000 people went to pay their respects. After a funeral in the Palace Chapel on 20 February, he was cremated, with half of his ashes scattered across Danish seas and half placed in the private section of the gardens at Fredensborg Palace.

== Issue ==
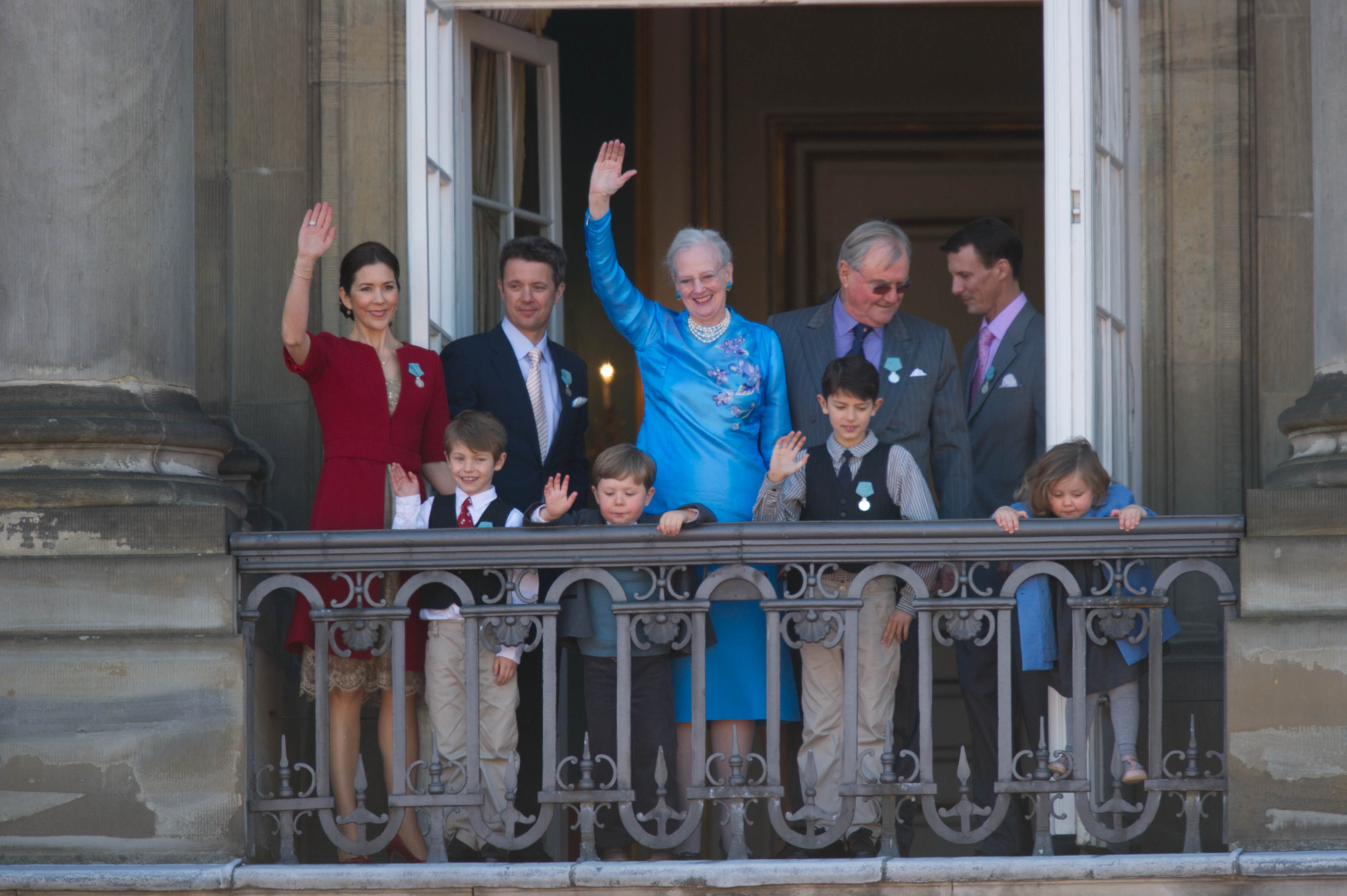
Prince Henrik surrounded by his family waving to crowds on Queen Margrethe II's 70th birthday in April 2010. From left to right: the Crown Princess, Prince Felix, the Crown Prince, Prince Christian, Queen Margrethe II, Prince Nikolai, Prince Henrik, Prince Joachim and Princess Isabella

Henrik had two sons and eight grandchildren, all born at Rigshospitalet in Copenhagen:

- King Frederik X (born 26 May 1968). He married Mary Donaldson on 14 May 2004 at Copenhagen Cathedral, Copenhagen. The couple have four children:
  - Crown Prince Christian (born 15 October 2005)
  - Princess Isabella (born 21 April 2007)
  - Prince Vincent (born 8 January 2011)
  - Princess Josephine (born 8 January 2011)
- Prince Joachim (born 7 June 1969). He married Alexandra Manley on 18 November 1995 at Frederiksborg Palace Church, Hillerød. They divorced on 8 April 2005. He married secondly Marie Cavallier on 24 May 2008 at Møgeltønder Church, Møgeltønder. Joachim has four children, two out of either marriage:
  - Count Nikolai (born 28 August 1999)
  - Count Felix (born 22 July 2002)
  - Count Henrik (born 4 May 2009)
  - Countess Athena (born 24 January 2012)

In 2008, Queen Margrethe II announced that her male-line descendants would bear the additional title of Count or Countess of Monpezat, in recognition of Henrik's ancestry. In 2023 Joachim's children were stripped of their princely titles. They will be known as Counts of Montpezat.

== Titles, styles and honours ==
Coat of arms of Prince Henrik of Denmark
- Armiger: Prince Henrik of Denmark

=== Titles and styles ===
- Before 10 June 1967: Count * Henri de Laborde de Monpezat
- 10 June 1967 – 2005: His Royal Highness Prince Henrik of Denmark
- 2005 – 14 April 2016: His Royal Highness The Prince Consort of Denmark
- 14 April 2016 – 13 February 2018: His Royal Highness Prince Henrik of Denmark

* Use is disputed, see section "French nobility and French title of "count" controversy" below

=== French nobility and French title of "count" controversy ===
Since late in the nineteenth century, some members of the Laborde de Monpezat family bear a title of "count", but this title (which is not a courtesy title in the context of the French nobility rules) is claimed without any legal basis.

Neither the French nobility of the de Laborde de Monpezat family nor this French title of "count" are acknowledged as historically or legally valid by most recent reference authors, specialists of the French nobility who do not consider that the de Laborde de Monpezat family belongs to the French nobility. This family is listed in the Encyclopédie de la fausse noblesse et de la noblesse d'apparence (English: Encyclopedia of False and Seeming Nobility); his name is not in the Catalogue de la noblesse française (English: Catalog of French Nobility) (2002) from Régis Valette and the author Charondas describes in his book À quel titre (Volume 37, 1970) the Laborde de Monpezat as "false nobles, low folk in the 17th century, not received in the states of Béarn due to 'alleged nobility and as having never had nobility in their family.'" The family's surname was "Monpezat" by the time of the French Revolution, without title, until 14 July 1860, when it was changed by imperial decree to "de Laborde-Monpezat", and legally changed again on 19 May 1861 to "de Laborde de Monpezat".

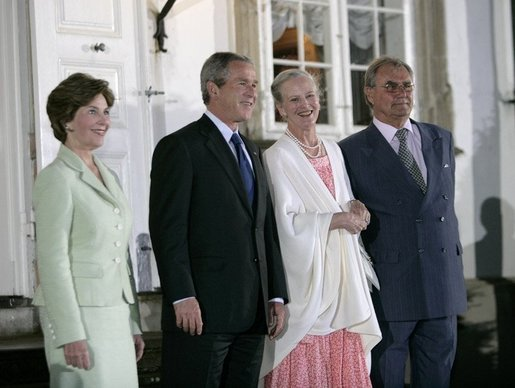
Henrik with Queen Margrethe, President George W. Bush and Laura Bush in 2005

Although Danish law never required that royal spouses be of aristocratic origin, no heir's marriage to a person who lacked male-line descent from royalty or titled nobility had been accepted as dynastic by the sovereign in the course of Denmark's history as a hereditary monarchy, until the marriage of the heir presumptive, Princess Margrethe, in June 1967 to "Count" Henri de Laborde de Monpezat. Six months later Margrethe's first cousin, Prince Ingolf of Denmark, married an untitled commoner and was demoted to a count, and when another cousin, Prince Christian of Denmark, also wed a Dane, Anne Dorte Maltoft-Nielsen, in 1971, he forfeited his dynastic position.

In 2008, the hereditary title of "Count of Monpezat" ("Greve af Monpezat") was granted by the Queen to her and Henrik's two sons, as a proper Danish title of nobility unrelated to a French noble title whatever, but in recognition of Henrik's French background.

=== Honours ===
==== National honours and awards ====
National honours:

- Denmark:
  - Knight of the Order of the Elephant (R.E.)
  - Grand Commander of the Order of Dannebrog (S.Kmd.)
  - Recipient of the Cross of Honour of the Order of the Dannebrog (D.Ht.)
  - Recipient of the 50th Birthday Medal of Queen Margrethe II
  - Recipient of the 50th Anniversary Medal of the Wedding of Queen Margrethe II and Prince Henrik
  - Recipient of the 75th Birthday Medal of Queen Margrethe II
  - Recipient of the Ruby Jubilee Medal of Queen Margrethe II
  - Recipient of the 70th Birthday Medal of Queen Margrethe II
  - Recipient of the 75th Birthday Medal of HRH the Prince Consort
  - Recipient of the Silver Jubilee Medal of Queen Margrethe II
  - Recipient of the 100th Anniversary Medal of the Birth of King Frederik IX
  - Recipient of the Queen Ingrid Commemorative Medal
  - Recipient of the 50th Anniversary Medal of the arrival of Queen Ingrid to Denmark
  - Recipient of the Defence Medal for Excellent Service
  - Recipient of the Homeguard Medal of Merit
  - Recipient of the Red Cross Medal of Honour
  - Recipient of the Danish Red Cross Medal for Merit
  - Recipient of the Medal of Honour of the League of Civil Defense
  - Recipient of the Medal of Honor of the Reserve Officers League
  - Recipient of the Military Athletic Medal of Honour
- Greenland:
  - Recipient of the Recipient of the Nersornaat Medal for Meritorious Service, 1st Class
- France:
  - Grand Cross of the National Order of the Legion of Honour in Diamonds
  - Grand Cross of the National Order of Merit
  - Commander of the Order of Agricultural Merit
  - Recipient of the North Africa Security and Order Operations Commemorative Medal

==== Foreign honours and awards ====
Foreign honours:

- Austria: Grand Star of the Decoration of Honour for Services to the Republic of Austria
- Belgium: Grand Cordon of the Order of Leopold I
- Brazil: Grand Cross of National Order of the Southern Cross
- Bulgaria: Grand Cross of the Order of the Balkan Mountains
- Croatia: Grand Cross of the Grand Order of Queen Jelena with Sash and Morning Star
- Egypt: Grand Cordon of the Order of the Nile
- Estonia: Member 1st Class of the Order of the Cross of Terra Mariana
- Finland: Grand Cross with Collar of the Order of the White Rose of Finland
- Germany: Grand Cross Special Class of the Order of Merit of the Federal Republic of Germany
- Greece: Grand Cross of the Order of Honour
- Iceland: Grand Cross of the Order of the Falcon
- Italy: Knight Grand Cross of the Order of Merit of the Italian Republic
- Japan: Grand Cordon of the Supreme Order of the Chrysanthemum
- Jordan: Grand Cordon of the Supreme Order of the Renaissance
- Latvia: Commander Grand Cross of the Order of the Three Stars
- Lithuania: Grand Cross of the Order of Vytautas the Great
- Luxembourg: Knight of the Order of the Gold Lion of the House of Nassau
- Mexico: Sash of Special Category of the Mexican Order of the Aztec Eagle
- Morocco: Grand Cross of the Order of the Throne
- Netherlands: Knight Grand Cross of the Order of the Netherlands Lion
- (Kingdom of Nepal) Nepalese Royal Family: Member of the Order of the Benevolent Ruler
- Norway: Grand Cross of the Royal Norwegian Order of Saint Olav
- Poland: Grand Cordon of the Order of Merit of the Republic of Poland
- Portugal:
  - Grand Cross of the Military Order of Christ
  - Grand Cross of the Military Order of Saint Benedict of Aviz
- Romania: Grand Cross of the Order of the Star of Romania
- Slovakia: Grand Cross of the Order of the White Double Cross
- South Korea: Grand Gwanghwa Medal of the Order of Diplomatic Service Merit
- Spain: Knight Grand Cross of the Royal and Distinguished Spanish Order of Charles III
- Sweden:
  - Knight of the Royal Order of the Seraphim
  - Recipient of the 85th Birthday Medal of King Gustaf VI Adolf
  - Recipient of the 50th Birthday Medal of King Carl XVI Gustaf
  - Recipient of the Ruby Jubilee Medal of King Carl XVI Gustaf
- Thailand: Knight Grand Cross of the Most Illustrious Order of Chula Chom Klao
- United Kingdom:
  - Honorary Knight Grand Cross of the Most Honourable Order of the Bath
  - Honorary Knight Grand Cross of the Most Distinguished Order of Saint Michael and Saint George
  - Honorary Knight Grand Cross of the Royal Victorian Order
- Yugoslavia: Great Star of the Order of the Yugoslav Star

== Publications ==
Prince Henrik translated several books into Danish and published several other books.

- In 1981, under the pseudonym H.M. Vejerbjerg he and the Queen translated Simone de Beauvoir's Tous les hommes sont mortels.
- Chemin faisant, 1982, a volume of French poems.
- Destin oblige, 1996, his memoirs as Prince Consort.
- Ikke Altid Gåselever (not always foie gras), 1999, a selection of favourite recipes.
- Cantabile, 2000, poems.
- Les escargots de Marie Lanceline, 2003.
- Murmures de vent, 2005, poems.
- Frihjul, 2010, poems.

== Bibliography ==
- Bramsen, Bo (1992). Huset Glücksborg. Europas svigerfader og hans efterslægt [The House of Glücksburg. The Father-in-law of Europe and his descendants] (in Danish) (2nd ed.). Copenhagen: Forlaget Forum. ISBN 87-553-1843-6.
- Lerche, Anna; Mandal, Marcus (2003). A royal family : the story of Christian IX and his European descendants. Copenhagen: Aschehoug. ISBN 9788715109577.

Prince Henrik of Denmark de Laborde de Monpezat family Born: 11 June 1934 Died: 13 February 2018
Danish royalty
Preceded by Ingrid of Sweden as queen consort	Prince consort of Denmark; 14 January 1972 – 13 February 2018	Vacant Title next held by Mary Donaldson as queen consort
