= The Fairest of Roses =

The Fairest of Roses (Danish: Den yndigste rose) is a fanfare for two trumpets and organ written in 2017 by Frederik Magle and published by Edition Wilhelm Hansen.

The work was premiered in Saint Paul's church in Copenhagen on 3 December 2017, on the occasion of the church's 140-year jubilee as well as the rededication of the church tower. It is also a tribute to Frederik Magle's mother Mimi Heinrich who died in May the same year. The Fairest of Roses is based on the melody for the Danish Christmas hymn Den yndigste rose er funden (1732) by Hans Adolph Brorson. Though the composer of the melody is unknown, it likely originates in the Wittenberg-area and was first published by Joseph Klug in 1542 used for the Latin burial-hymn 'Iam moesta quiesce'.

For concert performances the two trumpeters are to be placed 'antiphonally' with a distance between them, and the audience in-between, creating a spatial effect which is effective especially in larger rooms.

Though entitled a fanfare the character of the work is, for the most part, reflective and has been described as meditative and lucid with a 'touch of Celtic mistiness', containing both soft and lyrical passages but also majestic and powerful moments.
