= Cantabile (symphonic suite) =

Music composition by Frederik Magle

Cantabile is a work composed from 2004 to 2009 by Frederik Magle. It consists of three symphonic poems (or movements) based on poems written by Henrik, the Prince Consort of Denmark published in his book Cantabile. The Cantabile suite was commissioned by the Danish Royal Family and the first movement was premiered in 2004. The second and third movements were premiered on 10 June 2009, at a concert in the Copenhagen Concert Hall celebrating Prince Henrik's 75th birthday. On both occasions the music was performed by the Danish National Symphony Orchestra and Choir, conducted by Thomas Dausgaard.

The music alternates between the sorrowful, which - according to the Prince Consort's biography (2010) - being unexpected at a birthday concert, caused unease among some of the guests present at the first performance of the Cortège & Danse Macabre in 2009, and sudden bursts of humour.

Besides the original text by Prince Henrik in French, a Danish translation by Per Aage Brandt is also used in the work, and at places French and Danish is being sung at the same time.

== Structure ==
The three symphonic poems/movements forming the suite are:

- Souffle le vent (based on the poem Souffle le vent - English: Cry of the Winds)
- Cortège & Danse Macabre (based on the poem Cortège funèbre (with the subtitle Danse Macabre) - English: Funeral procession / Dance of Death)
- Carillon (based on the poems L'Angélus and Lacrymae mundi - English: The Angelus and Tears of the World)

== Instrumentation ==
Orchestration:

- 3 Flutes (3rd: Piccolo)
- 2 Oboes (2nd: English Horn)
- 3 Clarinets
- 1 Bass Clarinet
- 2 Bassoons
- 1 Contrabassoon
- 4 Horns
- 3 Trumpets
- 3 Trombones
- 1 Contrabass Tuba
- Timpani
- 3 Percussionists
- Harp
- Piano (soloist, third movement only)
- Organ
- Soprano (Soloist)
- Bass-baritone (Soloist)
- Mixed Choir (S,S,A,A,T,T,B,B)
- Strings

In the Carillon, the basses of the choir are required to sing the A below the bass-clef (27 notes below the middle C). Instruments of special note: The use of a giraffe's thigh bone as a percussion instrument in the Cortège & Danse Macabre.
