= Frederik Magle =

Danish composer, concert organist, and pianist (born 1977)

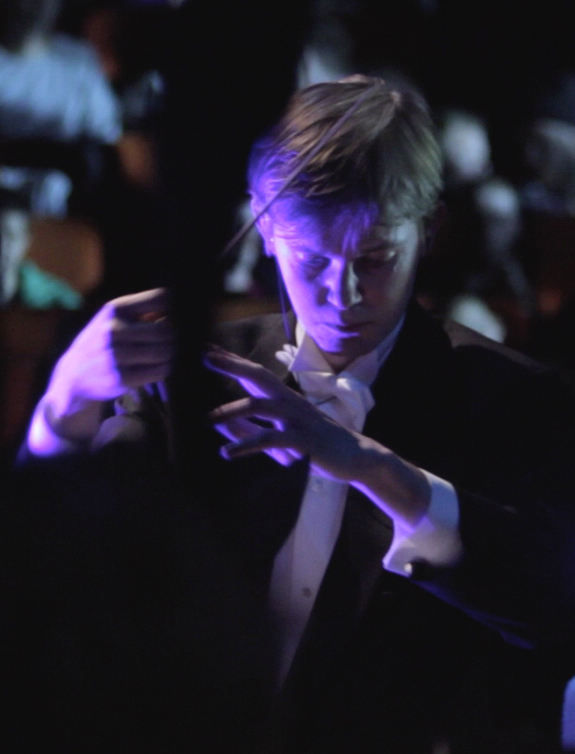
- Frederik Magle conducting on 20 September 2011, in the DRs Koncerthuset.
- Born: Frederik Reesen Magle; 17 April 1977 (age 49); Stubbekøbing, Denmark
- Occupations: Composer, concert organist, pianist

Frederik Reesen Magle (Danish pronunciation: [ˈfʁeðˀʁek ˈmɑwlə, ˈfʁæðˀʁæk -]; born 17 April 1977) is a Danish composer, concert organist, and pianist. He writes contemporary classical music as well as fusion of classical music and other genres. His compositions include orchestral works, cantatas, chamber music, and solo works (mainly for organ), including several compositions commissioned by the Danish royal family. Magle has gained a reputation as an organ virtuoso, and as a composer and performing artist who does not refrain from venturing into more experimental projects – often with improvisation – bordering jazz, electronica, and other non-classical genres.

His best-known works include his concerto for organ and orchestra The Infinite Second, his brass quintet piece Lys på din vej (Light on your path), composed for the christening of Prince Nikolai, The Hope for brass band and choir, his symphonic suite Cantabile, a collection of improvisations for organ titled Like a Flame, and his fanfare for two trumpets and organ The Fairest of Roses.

== Life ==
Frederik Magle was born in Stubbekøbing, the son of actress and writer Mimi Heinrich and organist, painter and sculptor Christian Reesen Magle (1925–96). He is the great-nephew of the composer Emil Reesen (his grandmother's brother). Recognized early as a child prodigy, he appeared on television and in the news media at the age of 9.

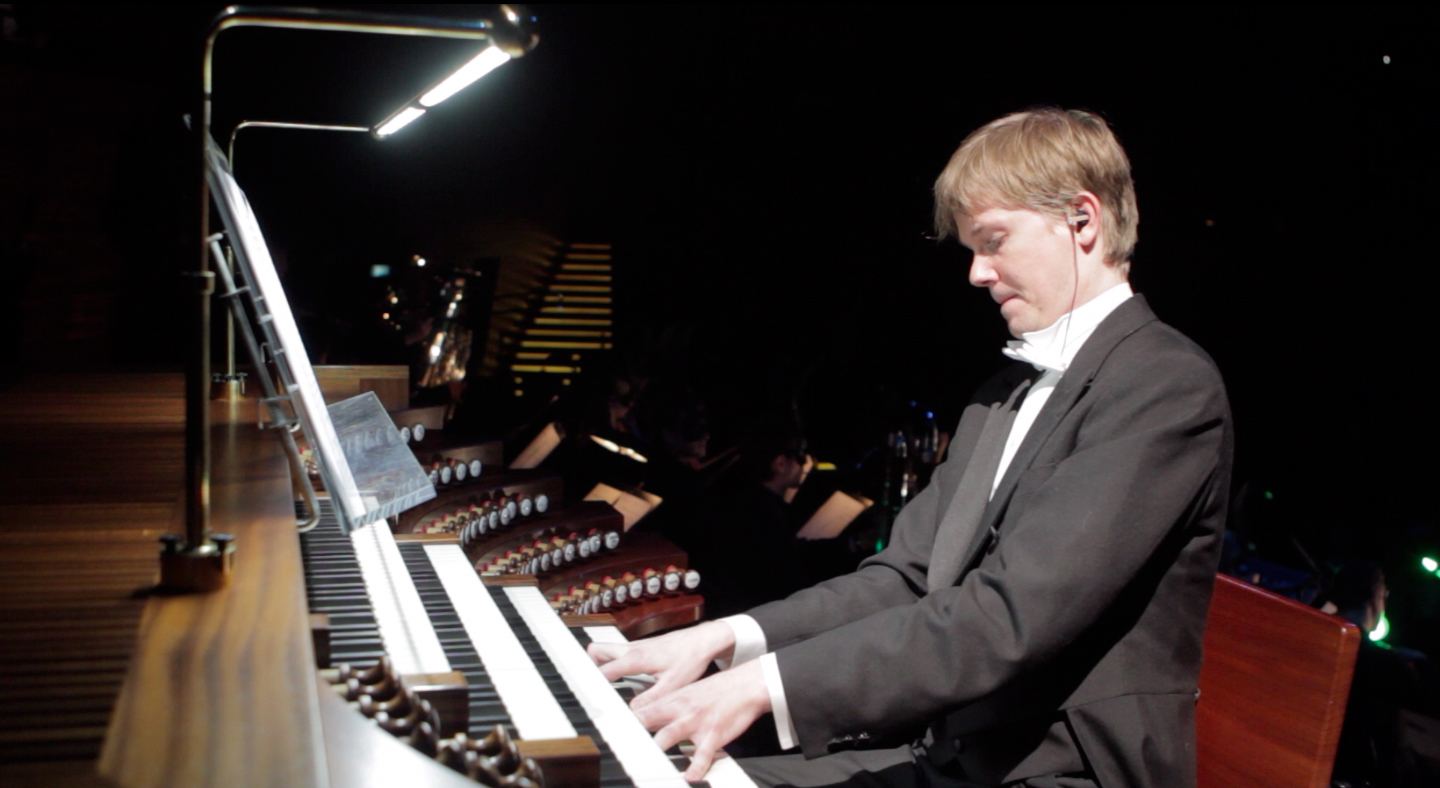
Frederik Magle at the organ in Koncerthuset, Copenhagen

Magle was educated as a private student of Leif Thybo (composition and music theory), and Ib Bindel (organ). He was taught piano, score reading, and music theory from the age of six. At the age of 16, he was admitted to the Royal Danish Academy of Music, where he was taught music theory by Yngve Jan Trede, but after one and a half years he decided to leave the music academy, explaining that he "could not both study at the conservatory and work independently as a composer at the same time." He later stated that the decision "was difficult, and there was a lot to think through," but that he did not regret it.

He received the scholarship of countess Erna Hamilton in 1993. In 1994, as an organ soloist, he won the Danish qualification rounds and national final of the Eurovision Young Musicians competition. He was one of eight winners of the 24 national competitions that year to be selected for the European final, held at the Philharmonic Concert Hall in Warsaw, Poland on 14 June 1994. He performed Francis Poulenc's Organ Concerto, but was not placed in the top 3. The Polish organizers originally planned the qualifying round to be held elsewhere, but moved it to the Philharmonic Hall (which contains a pipe organ) to accommodate Magle's participation.

Magle's father died in 1996, shortly before the first performance of Frederik Magle's Christmas cantata A newborn child, before eternity, God!, which is dedicated to him. Magle was awarded the Freemason's Arts Prize in 2001. In 2006 he took ownership of the classical music internet forum "Talk Classical".

He has said that he often gets his ideas in dreams and always have a notebook next to him when he sleeps, in case he gets an idea for a "musical phrase or an orchestral build-up" during the night.

== Music ==
=== 1985–1999 ===
The first public performance of one of Frederik Magle's compositions took place on Easter morning 7 April 1985, in Stubbekøbing church, where a children's choir performed an Easter hymn he had composed. Two years later, in 1987, six of his hymns with texts by his mother Mimi Heinrich were performed by actress and singer Annie Birgit Garde at a concert in Lyngby church, and the same year he played on television for the first time. In 1988, two of his larger works, the cantata We are afraid, and the "mini-musical" A Christmas Child, were premiered in Grundtvig's Church in Copenhagen before an audience of 2,000 people. He began a collaboration with the violinist Nikolaj Znaider in 1990, and they performed a series of concerts together. Later, Znaider gave the first performance of Magle's variations for violin and piano in the Concertgebouw, Amsterdam, with the pianist Daniel Gortler: Journey in time describes a "kind of scenes or musical images" with the use of sharp dissonances, complicated rhythms and dramatic transitions and thematic formations.

In 1993 Magle composed music for the experimental theatre performance Der Die Das by the theatrical group Hotel Pro Forma, directed by Kirsten Dehlholm, which was performed at the 4th international Dance Festival in Munich, Germany. Other artists involved were the architect Thomas Wiesner, sculptors Anders Krüger and Frans Jacobi, painter Tomas Lahoda, and the costume designer Annette Meyer; it was presented as a contemporary "Gesamtkunstwerk" comprising architecture, art, music, and performance.

Magle's concerto for organ and orchestra The Infinite Second was given its first performance and recorded in 1994 at the 3rd international music festival in Riga Cathedral, Latvia by the Latvian Philharmonic Chamber Orchestra, conducted by Dzintars Josts, with Frederik Magle himself as organ soloist. The reviewer of Berlingske Tidende, Steen Chr. Steensen, described the organ concerto as "a long process from darkness to light" tonally "founded in the French school of organ music". It was released on CD in 1996 along with his second symphony for organ Let there be light which had been premiered in Riga Cathedral in 1993. The culture journalist Jakob Levinsen wrote of Magle's method of structuring the two works:

...while his music appears quite conventional in terms of the traditional musical parameters, such as a preference for arch forms and a relatively conservative use of free tonality in terms of melody and harmony, what could be labelled the dramatic characters of his music are very definitely developed from the specific possibilities of the church organ itself. That goes for the often occurring contrast between very bright and very dark timbres, between clearly defined melodic lines and closely woven fields of sound, between huge pillars of chords and energetically moving patterns of rhythm. And it goes for his two dominating ways of structuring his music as well (...) the gradual building of dynamic tensions through adding more and more layers of sound, the abrupt changes between light and dark, force and calm, clear and veiled. Including the courage to extend some of the parameters into the extremes – such as when a rhythmic pattern becomes so dense as to almost blurring the contours of the figurations involved, and only the outline of movement remains...

— Jacob Levinsen

The Christmas cantata A newborn child, before eternity, God! was given its first performance in 1996, commissioned by Kulturby 96 – the European Capital of Culture 1996. In 1997 it was released on CD, in a recording made in Messiaskirken in Charlottenlund by the soloists Ingibjörg Gudjonsdottir, soprano, Elisabeth Halling, alto, Gert Henning-Jensen, tenor, Christian Christiansen, bass, two mixed choirs, two children's choirs, brass band, organ and percussion, conducted by Steen Lindholm. The cantata was described by the reviewer of Jyllands-Posten as hard to classify, with a "religiously narrative robustness". The work sets text from a kontakion by the 6th century hymnographer Romanos the Melodist, translated into Danish by the theology professor Christian Thodberg, and edited by the priest Kristian Høeg.

In 1995–96 Magle composed a symphonic Lego Fantasia in three movements for piano and symphony orchestra, commissioned by the Lego Group. It was premiered on 24 August 1997 at a concert in St George's Chapel, Windsor Castle by the London Philharmonic Orchestra conducted by David Parry, with Magle himself on piano. In 1998 the same performers recorded the work for a CD released by the Lego Group. Also in 1998 he was commissioned to write a work for Amnesty International: he composed Flammer for Frihed (Flames for Freedom) for solo piano. The piece was printed in a book of the same title containing essays by 24 Danes (including then prime minister Poul Nyrup Rasmussen, former prime minister Poul Schlüter, Tøger Seidenfaden, Ghita Nørby, and others). Edited by Monica Ritterband, the book was published on the 50th anniversary of the Universal Declaration of Human Rights. On 22 November 1998 Magle's Cantata to Saint Cecilia for soloists, choir, children's choir, and chamber orchestra was given its first performance at the Ny Carlsberg Glyptotek in Copenhagen. The following year it was recorded and released on the album Cæciliemusik (Music for Saint Cecilia) by the Danish Cæciliekoret (The Cecilia Choir) conducted by Gunnar Svensson with the soloists Birgitte Ewerlöf (soprano), Tuva Semmingsen (alto), and Jørgen Ditlevsen (bass). The cantata's text is by the author Iben Krogsdal; based on the story of Saint Cecilia, who died in a gruesome way for her Christian faith, it has been described as "moderate modernism" with a special "Danish tone" and a transparent chamber musical instrumentation.

=== 2000–present ===
In 2001 his work, The Hope, for brass band, choir, organ and percussion, was given its first performance during the commemoration of the 200th anniversary of the Battle of Copenhagen. The composition was commissioned by the Admiral Danish Fleet in cooperation with the Reformed Church in Copenhagen, where the premiere performance took place on 1 April. The Hope was subsequently recorded and released by the Royal Danish Navy on the album Søværnet Ønsker God Vind (The Royal Danish Navy Wishes Godspeed) in 2005.

The Danish organ builders Frobenius commissioned a new work by Magle for their centennial jubilee in 2009. Magle premiered the work, his Rhapsody for organ Viva Voce, at two gala concerts on 12–14 May 2009 in Aarhus Cathedral and Vangede church, in collaboration with Dame Gillian Weir.

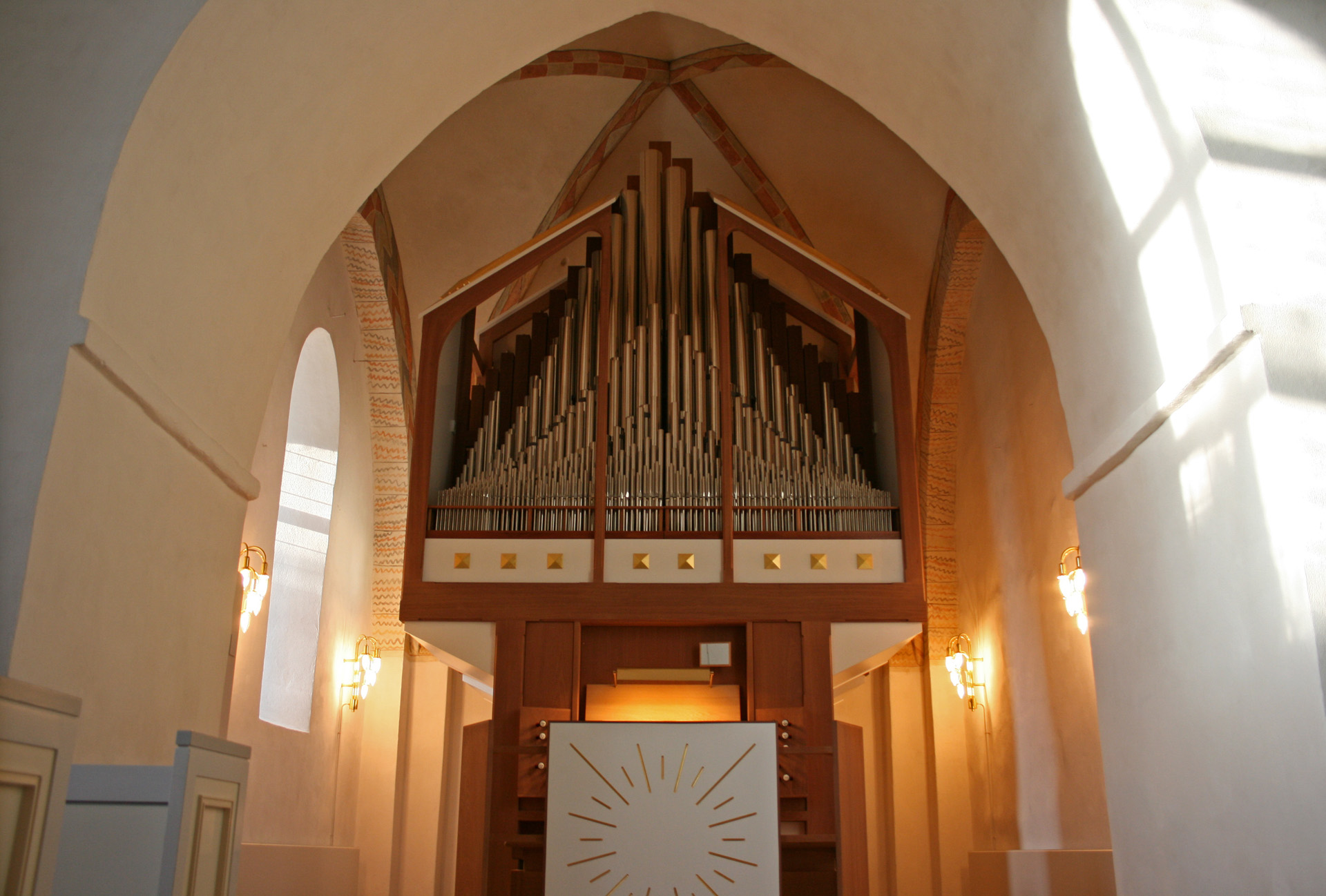
The Frobenius-organ in Jørlunde church

In October that same year, a new pipe organ was inaugurated in Jørlunde church. Magle created its specifications and tonal design, after the old organ had perished in a fire five years earlier while in storage; he gave the instrument's inauguration concert on 8 November. In 2010 he released a double album of free improvisations on the Jørlunde-organ, Like a Flame. Reviews of the album were predominantly favorable, described in MusicWeb International as "highly creative, sometimes visionary, [and] surprisingly unpompous", but a scathing review in the Danish organ magazine ORGLET argued for traditional fugal and choral forms instead of free improvisation. One critic complained about the length of the album, finding it too long at more than two hours. The organist, jazz-pianist, and composer Henrik Sørensen defended Magle's free improvisational form in an article in Danish organ-magazine Orgelforum.

In 2011 Magle composed an Allehelgenmesse (All Hallows Mass), intended to be performed at the All Hallows service on the first Sunday of November, where people are invited to remember relatives who have died in the past year. Its text is by the hymn-writer Iben Krogsdal and the pastor Morten Skovsted. Funded by the Danish Ministry Ecclesiastical Affairs, the Mass was made freely available online. After a performance in St Nicolas' Church, Rønne, a music critic described the music as "intimate" and with "finish".

Magle composed the work Fanfare and Anthem 'Skyward' for brass ensemble, timpani and percussion which was premiered at the rollout ceremony for the Danish F-35 fighter jets on April 7, 2021. It was performed by Prinsens Musikkorps (The Prince of Denmark Air Force Band) and conducted by Peter Ettrup Larsen.

=== Works for the Danish royal family ===
Magle played the organ at the christening of Prince Nikolai at Fredensborg Castle in 1999 and gave the first performance of his composition Lys på din vej (Light on your path) for organ and brass quintet, with the Brass Ensemble of the Royal Danish Guards, as postlude. Lys på din vej was released on an album with the same title the following year, which received mixed reviews, being criticized especially by the newspaper Politiken for consisting of "endless repetitions of the same melodic material without development". The piece was re-recorded in 2013 by the Brass Ensemble of the Royal Danish Guards in a new version on their album Nordisk Musik (Nordic Music). At the christening of Prince Felix in Møgeltønder church in 2002 another work by Frederik Magle was also premiered as postlude.

Magle composed a symphonic suite Cantabile, based on poems by Prince Henrik of Denmark (the Prince Consort) of which the first movement "Souffle le vent" was first performed in 2004, and the remaining two movements "Cortège & Danse Macabre" and "Carillon", in June 2009 in the Koncerthuset (Copenhagen), on both occasions by the Danish National Symphony Orchestra conducted by Thomas Dausgaard. The score specifies a real giraffe thigh bone as a percussion instrument in the "Cortège & Danse Macabre" movement.

In 2020 Frederik Magle composed the Fanfare for The Royal Danish Orchestra (Det Kongelige Kapels Fanfare) for the Royal Danish Orchestra, commissioned by the Royal Danish Theatre on the occasion of queen Margrethe II's 80th birthday. The fanfare was originally planned to be premiered at a gala concert at the Royal Danish Theatre's Old Stage, but due to the corona-lockdown the music was instead recorded by the musicians individually in their own homes and subsequently edited and presented to the queen On June 7 the same year the fanfare received its live premiere, conducted by Thomas Søndergaard at the re-opening of the Royal Danish Theatre. The fanfare was described as "a rousing ceremonial piece" in Gramophone magazine's review of the concert.

=== Fusion/crossover ===
Magle's first CD, Sangen er et eventyr – Sange over H.C. Andersens eventyr (The song is a fairytale – Songs based on fairytales by Hans Christian Andersen), of 1994 was recorded with the jazz double bassist Niels-Henning Ørsted Pedersen, the jazz-pianist Niels Lan Doky, the percussionist Alex Riel, Trio Rococo, and vocalist Thomas Eje. He also participated on the 2005 avant garde album Hymn to Sophia by the jazz saxophonist John Tchicai, where he improvised on pipe organ with Tchicai and the percussionist Peter Ole Jørgensen.

In 2011 Magle composed symphonic music for the album Elektra by the Danish hip hop group Suspekt. Emil Simonsen from Suspekt characterised Magle's contribution as "essential for the development of the new album", and described Frederik Magle as "one of the greatest musical sources of inspiration" the group had worked with. The collaboration received positive reviews in the Danish press, with Jyllands-Posten calling the track "Nyt Pas" from Elektra "glowing orchestral hip hop with mature ambitions", and the music magazine Gaffa describing the contrasts between Frederik Magle's classical compositions and Suspekt's hip hop as "extreme opposites that helped to make the evening special" in their review of the release concert in Koncerthuset, September 2011. The orchestral music was recorded by the Czech Film Orchestra in the Rudolfinum Concert Hall, Prague.

Magle's fusion-work Polyphony, which combines rock music with contemporary classical music, was published in the Australian music textbook In Tune With Music, written by Ian Dorricott and Bernice Allan in 2013.

== List of works ==
This is a selective list of Magle's major works, including all that have been recorded as of 2014. For a complete list of his works, see List of compositions by Frederik Magle.

=== Orchestra ===
- Concerto for organ and orchestra The infinite second (1994)
- Symphonic Lego Fantasia for piano and orchestra, commissioned by the Lego Group (1995–96)
- Rising of a new day (1998)
- Lys på din vej (Light on your path) – orchestral version (1999–2000)
- Cantabile, symphonic suite consisting of three symphonic poems for orchestra, choir, and soloists (2004–2009)
- Nuit mélodique for soprano, piano, and string orchestra (2016)
- Den Hemmelige Have (The Secret Garden) for orchestra, written for the radiation therapy ward at Rigshospitalet (2019)
- Det Kongelige Kapels Fanfare (Fanfare for The Royal Danish Orchestra) for brass ensemble and percussion (2020)

=== Choir ===
- We Are Afraid Cantata for choir, flute, clarinet, percussion, strings, piano, and organ (1988)
- Der Die Das, opera for 2 soloists and choir (by Hotel Pro Forma) (1993)
- A newborn child, before eternity, God! Christmas cantata, for brass band, choir, soloists, organ and percussion (1996)
- Cantata to Saint Cecilia for soloists, choir, children's choir, and chamber orchestra (1998)
- The Hope for brass band, choir, organ and percussion, written in memory of the battle of Copenhagen (2001)
- Phoenix for mixed choir and organ or piano four-hands (2003)
- Allehelgenmesse (All Hallows Mass) for soprano, choir, cello and organ (2011)

=== Songs and Hymns ===
- 30 hymns (1985)
- 20 songs based on fairy tales by Hans Christian Andersen (1986–92)

=== Organ ===
- Symphony for organ No. 1 (1990)
- Symphony for organ No. 2 Let there be light (1993)
- Fantasia for organ Forårssol (1999)
- Cantilena (2003)
- Viva Voce (2008)
- At Blive (To Become) (2009)
- Like a Flame, 22 pieces for organ (2009–2010)

=== Piano ===
- Flammer for Frihed (Flames for Freedom) (1998)

=== Chamber music ===
- Lys på din vej (Light on your path) for organ and brass quintet, written for the christening of Prince Nikolai of Denmark (1999)
- Variations and theme Rejse i Tid (Journey in Time) for violin and piano (1999)
- Decet Dage og Nætter (Days and Nights) (1999)
- Intermezzo for brass quintet (2001)
- Kosmos for trumpet and organ (2001)
- Dåbens Pagt (Pact of the Baptism) for brass quintet, written for the christening of Prince Felix of Denmark (2002)
- The Fairest of Roses (Den Yndigste Rose), fanfare for two trumpets and organ (2017)
- "Lament" for violin and organ (2017)

=== Other ===
- Handle with care – Life inside ballet. HD recording (tape) with song, synthesizers and sound effects (1995)
- En Anden Verden – Indgangen (Another World – The Entrance) for brass band (1997)

== Discography ==
- 1993 Sangen er et eventyr (The song is a fairytale). Thomas Eje, The Danish Boys' Choir, Trio Rococo, Niels Lan Doky, Niels-Henning Ørsted Pedersen, Alex Riel. BMG 74321 24537-2
- 1994 The Infinite Second. Latvian Philharmonic Chamber Orchestra, Dzintars Josts, Frederik Magle (The organ in Riga Cathedral). EMI Classics 5555972
- 1997 Et nyfødt barn, før evighed, Gud! (A newborn child, before eternity, God). Christmas cantata. EMI Classics 5565942
- 1998 Symphonic Lego Fantasia. London Philharmonic Orchestra, David Parry, Frederik Magle (piano). Released by the Lego Group.
- 1999 Cæciliemusik (Music for Saint Cecilia). Danacord DACOCD 520
- 2000 Lys på din vej (Light on your path). Frederik Magle (piano and organ), The Brass Ensemble of the Royal Danish Guards, Danish National Chamber Orchestra, Frans Rasmussen. EMI Classics 5571152
- 2004 Kosmos. ClassicO CLASSCD 478
- 2005 Søværnet Ønsker God Vind (The Royal Danish Navy wishes godspeed). The Royal Danish Naval Band. Released by the Royal Danish Navy
- 2005 Hymne til Sofia (Hymn to Sophia). John Tchicai, Peter Ole Jørgensen, Frederik Magle. Calibrated CALI012
- 2010 Like a Flame. Frederik Magle (organ improvisations). Proprius Music PRCD 2061
- 2011 Elektra. Featured symphonic music by Frederik Magle on the Suspekt-album. Universal Music/Tabu Records.
- 2013 Nordisk Musik. Music for voice and brass quintet, including "Lys på din vej". Povl Dissing, Signe Sneh Schreiber, Den Kongelige Livgardes Messingensemble (Brass Ensemble of the Royal Danish Guards). Exlibris EXLCD30158
- 2017 Anastasis-Messe.
