= Reformed Church, Copenhagen =

Reformed Church
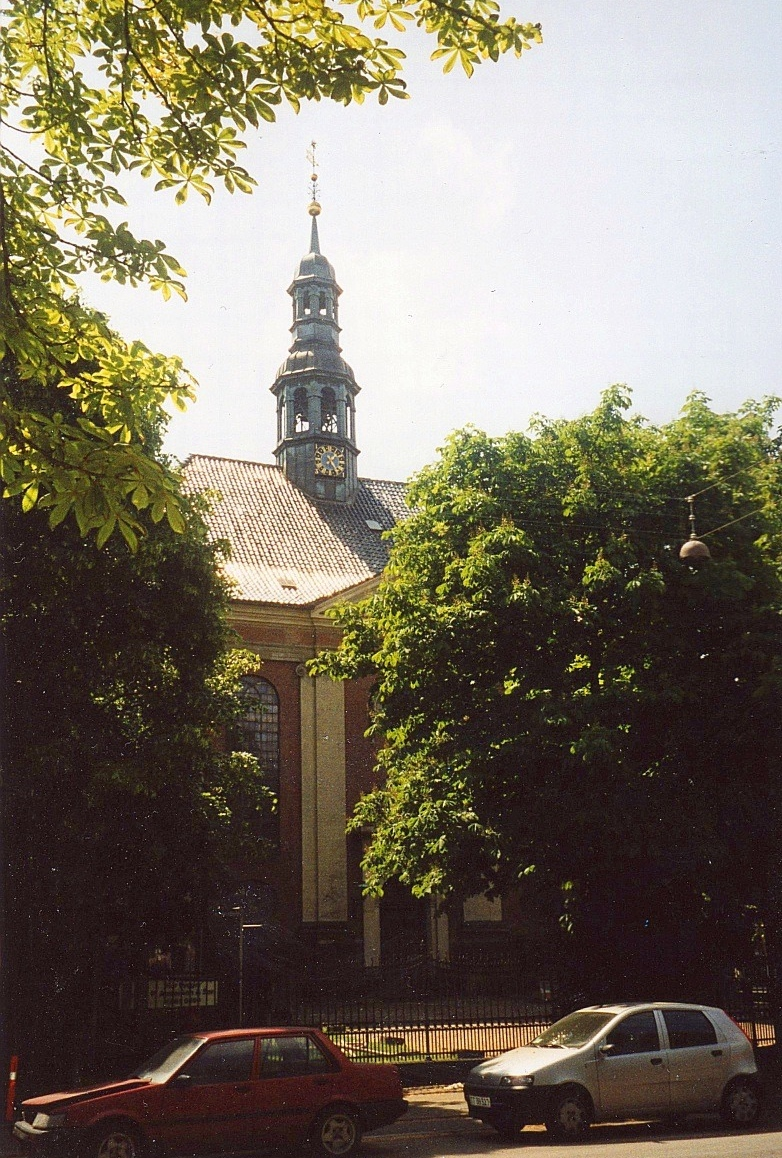
- Reformed Church seen from Gothersgade
- Reformed Church
- 55°41′1.57″N 12°34′30.38″E
- Location: 109 Gothersgade; Copenhagen
- Country: Denmark
- Denomination: Reformed

History
- Status: Church

Architecture
- Architect: Hendrik Brokhamm (attributed)
- Architectural type: Church
- Style: Dutch Baroquel
- Groundbreaking: 1688
- Completed: 1689

Specifications
- Length: 25 m
- Width: 16 m
- Materials: Brick

Reformed Church (Danish: Reformert Kirke) in Gothersgade, opposite Rosenborg Castle, is a church building used by the reformed congregations in Copenhagen, Denmark. Consecrated in 1689, the church was instigated by Queen Charlotte Amalie, consort of King Christian V, who was herself a German Calvinist. The church is noted for its fine Baroque interiors which date from 1730 when it was restored after being damaged in the Copenhagen Fire of 1728.

== History ==
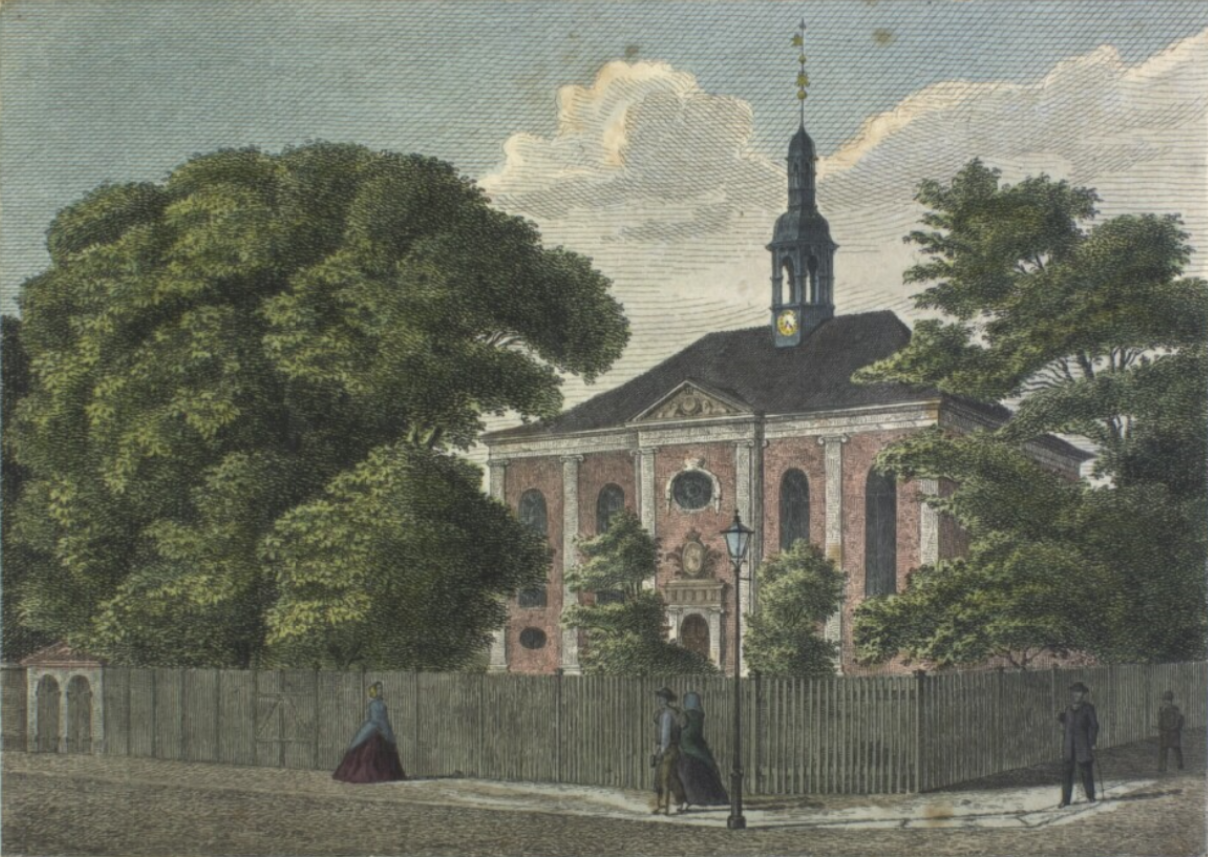
Reformed Church, 1860

Prior to her marriage to King Christian V of Denmark in 1667, Charlotte Amalie of Hesse-Kassel had requested, and had been granted for herself and her court, the right to profess freely her Reformed faith.

In 1685, encouraged by his queen, Christian V licensed the formation of a reformed congregation among German, Dutch and French immigrants. Mainly refugees, many members of the congregation held prominent positions in society, typically as merchants, craftsmen, often with new trades, or military officers. After a few years the congregation split into a German Reformed Church and a French Reformed Church.

Charlotte Amelia also personally financed the erection of the church building on a prominent site in Gothersgade, opposite Rosenborg Castle. The architect was Hendrik Brokhamm, a Dutch sculptor who had recently arrived in Denmark and later worked with Lambert van Haven, for instance on the Church of Our Saviour at Christianshavn where he executed the main portal.

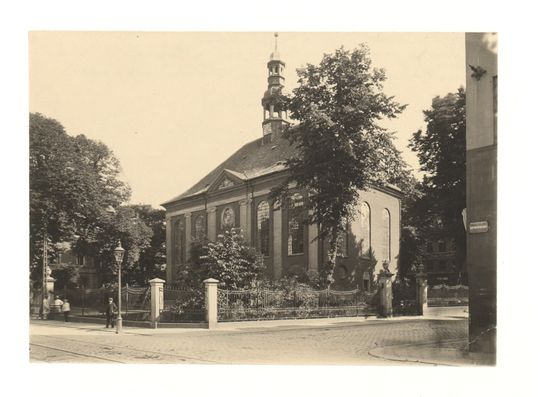
Reformed Church, c. 1914

Charlotte Amalie placed the foundation stone on 20 April 1688, and the building was consecrated on 10 November 1689. The German and French reformed churches shared the new church. The complex also included a rectory, with residences for four priests, a school, an old age asylum, and an orphanage.

The church was badly damaged in the Copenhagen Fire of 1728 but was subsequently rebuilt with new furnishings attributed the sculptor Friederich Ehbisch (c. 1672–1748).

In 1886 the architect Ludvig Knudsen built a community house for the congregation (menighedshus) and a multi-storey building and in 1880 he conducted a restoration of the church.

== Architecture ==
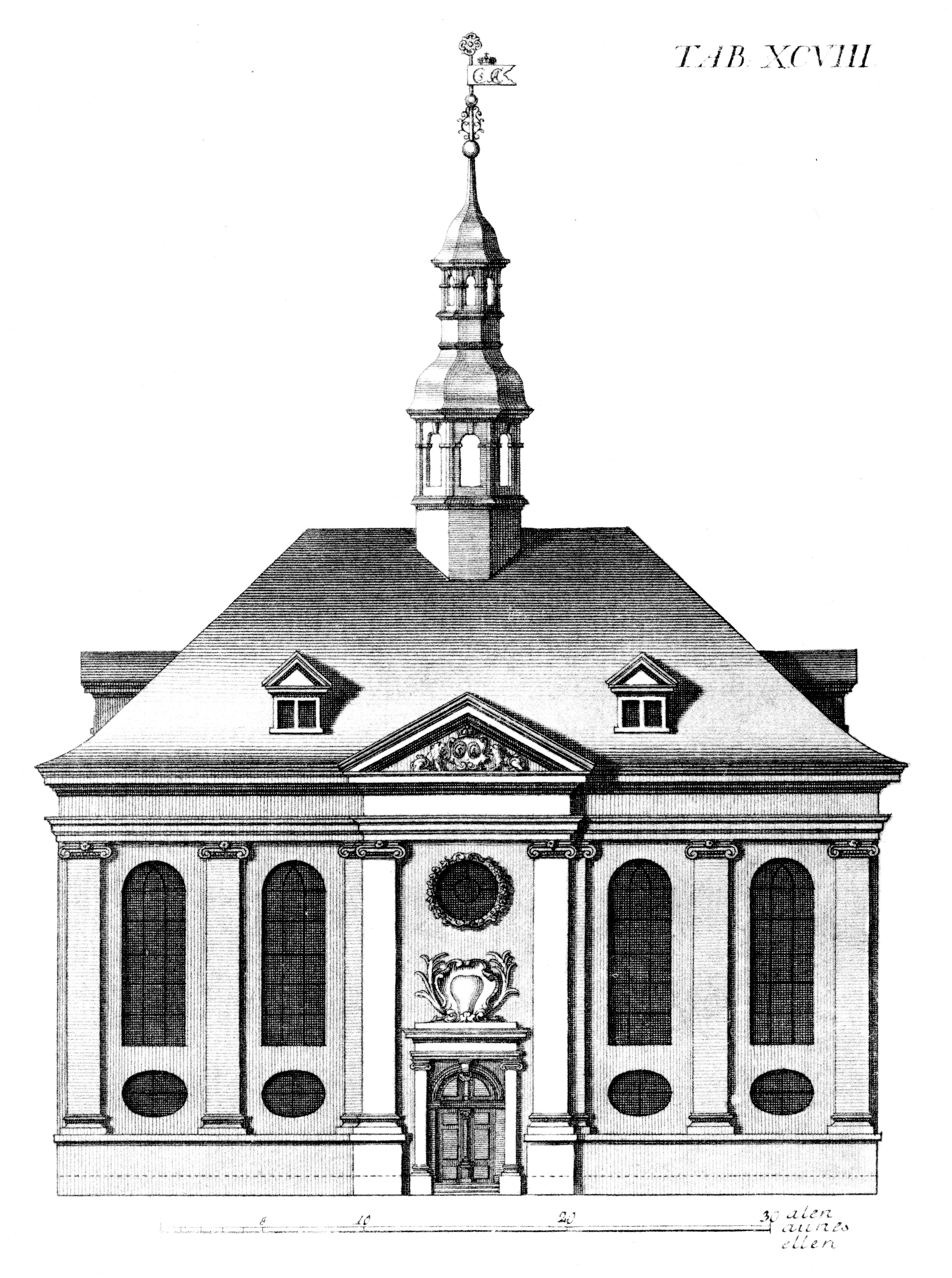
Engraving from Lauritz de Thurah's Hafnia Hodierna, 1748

The church is built in red brick and designed in the Dutch Baroque style. It has a rectangular floor plan with a slightly progressing median risalit on the facade toward Gothersgade, decorated with Ionic pilasters and a triangular pediment. Above the entrance there is a cartouche with the monograms of Christian V and Charlotte Amalie and an inscription from Isaiah 2.3.

The hipped roof with black tiles is topped by a copper-clad flèche with two lanterns which rises 13.5 metres above the roof. It was added in 1731 in connection with the rebuilding after the fire.

== Interior ==
The church room is oriented along the short axis of the building and is dominated by beautifully carved wooden features. Typical of reformed but unusual for Danish churches, it has a centrally placed pulpit set dramatically high above the altar table.

The organ front was originally from Copenhagen Castle and dates from 1724. It was transferred to the church in 1730 when the castle was demolished to make room for the first Christiansborg Palace. The current organ was made by the organ manufacturer Köhne and is from 1878.

The church's closed boxes were reserved for noble families and later the wealthy merchants of the congregation.

== Churchyard ==
The churchyard next to the church has been decommissioned. The original German section to the left of the entrance has no graves left but the French section to the right still has 18 graves and the shared churchyard to the rear also has a number of gravestones, including that of Vice Admiral Olfert Fischer the son of Dutch immigrants, who was one of the Danish commanders in the Battle of Copenhagen in 1801. Other interments include the Danish Court Painter Jacques d'Agar who immigrated from France, and C. de Cormaillon, commander of Kastellet.

== Burials ==
- Antoine-Nicolas le Sage de Fontenay (1725—1787), naval officer
- Olfert Fischer (1747–1820), naval officer
- Urban Jürgensen (1776–1830), clockmaker

== Reformed Church today ==
The church is still used by the German and French Reformed Churches in Copenhagen and since 1990 also by a Korean congregation. Along with a fourth congregation in Fredericia, Jutland, they form the Reformed Synod of Denmark which is a member of the World Alliance of Reformed Churches.

The church and churchyard is open every Wednesday and Thursday from 11:30 to 15:30 from spring to autumn.

== See also ==
- St. Peter's Church, Copenhagen
- Christian's Church, Copenhagen
