= Knud Bartels =

Danish general

Knud Bartels S.K.
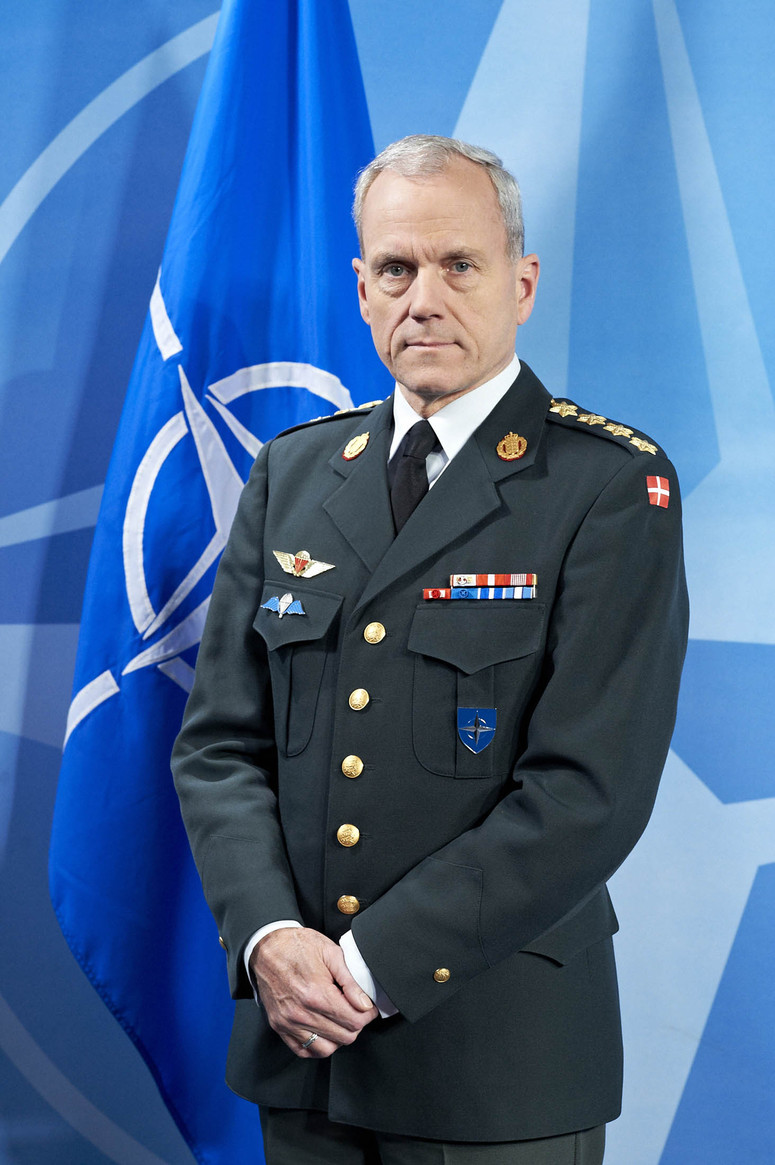
- Bartels in 2012

Chairman of the NATO Military Committee
- In office 2 January 2012 – 26 June 2015
- Preceded by: Walter E. Gaskin (acting)
- Succeeded by: Petr Pavel

Danish Chief of Defence
- In office 16 November 2009 – 31 December 2011
- Preceded by: Bjørn Bisserup (acting)
- Succeeded by: Bjørn Bisserup (acting)

Personal details
- Born: 8 April 1952 (age 73) Copenhagen, Denmark
- Spouse(s): Unknown (died); Inge Vansteenkiste
- Children: 2
- Parent: Eyvind Bartels (father)
- Occupation: Adjunct professor at Royal Danish Defence College

Military service
- Allegiance: Denmark; NATO
- Branch/service: Royal Danish Army
- Years of service: 1972–2015
- Rank: General
- Awards: Grand Cross of the Order of the Dannebrog 25 Years Good Service Medal; Knight 1 st Class of the French National Order of Merit Knight of the French Order of the Legion of Honour

Knud Bartels (born 8 April 1952) is a retired Danish general, who served as the Danish Chief of Defence between 2009 and 2011 and was Chairman of the NATO Military Committee from 2011 to 2015.

== Early life ==
Bartels was born in Copenhagen in 1952, and is the son of Eyvind Bartels, who served as Danish ambassador in OEEC and later Washington, Knud Bartels, therefore spent much of his childhood abroad, living many years in Paris. He joined the army in 1972, and went to Royal Danish Military Academy the following year. He went on tour on the UN mission to Cypres in 1980, and became Denmark's Permanent Representative on NATO's Military Committee in 2006.

== Chief of Defence ==
He was appointed as Danish Chief of Defence on 16 November 2009 (announced on 10 November). He succeeded admiral Tim Sloth Jørgensen who resigned after being involved in the controversy around a fake Arabic translation of Jæger – i krig med eliten, a book by a former special forces soldier which he tried to suppress.

== Chairman of the NATO Military Committee ==
As Chief of Defence and Denmark's former Permanent Representative on NATO's Military Committee, General Bartels was Denmark's candidate for the post as Chairman of NATO's Military Committee. The new chairman succeeded Admiral Giampaolo Di Paola (Italian Navy) on 1 July 2012. General Bartels' tenure as chief of defence was due to expire on 30 April 2012.

Although other chiefs of defence were considered for the top NATO job, in the final week before the vote the other candidates – as is the custom – sensing a lack of majority support for their own candidacy, withdrew from consideration so that the election of General Bartels could be unanimous when the committee met to vote on Saturday 17 September 2011. The new chairman is appointed for a 3-year term, near the end of which he is normally approved for a one-year extension (serving a total of 4 years as chairman).

Upon his election on 17 September 2011, General Bartels announced that he planned to step-down as Danish Chiefs of Defence on 30 April 2012 in order to prepare to take over as NATO Chairman effective 1 July 2012. However, following the resignation of Italian Prime Minister Silvio Berlusconi on 12 November 2011, Italy's new prime minister, Mario Monti, announced on 16 November that he had appointed Admiral Di Paola as Italy's new defense minister: at the time of this announcement, Admiral Di Paola was in Kabul, Afghanistan, on NATO business. The admiral resigned as NATO Chairman on 18 November, turning over to his deputy, Lieutenant General Walter Gaskin (U.S. Marine Corps), and flew to Rome. It was then announced that General Bartels would take over in Brussels on 2 January 2012, even though the new Danish government had not yet selected his replacement as Danish chief of defense. He retired on 15 July 2015, after 43 years of service.

== Personal life ==
Bartels is married to Belgian Inge Vansteenkiste, where they have 4 children, 2 from each's former marriage. After his retirement, he was the first person to be given the position of adjunct professor at the Royal Danish Defence College.

== Awards and decorations ==
| Grand Cross of the Order of the Dannebrog |
| 25 Years of Good Service (Denmark) |
| The Home Guard 25 years Long Service Medal (Denmark) |
| The Reserve Officers Association of Denmark Medal of Honor |
| Knight 1 st Class of the French National Order of Merit |
| Knight of the French Order of the Legion of Honour |
| Commander Degree of the Legion of Merit Medal |
| Commander with Star of the Royal Norwegian Order of Merit |
| Greek Commendation Medal Star of Merit of Honour |
| UN Medal for UNFICYP |
| NATO Medal for KFOR |

Other Accoutrements
| Freefall Parachutist Badge |
| Parachutist Badge (UK) |
| CMC Badge |

Military offices
| Preceded by Giampaolo Di Paola | Chairman of the NATO Military Committee; 2012–2015 | Succeeded by Petr Pavel |
| Preceded by Tim Sloth Jørgensen | Chief of Defence (Denmark); 2009-2012 | Succeeded by Peter Bartram |
