= Bjørn Bisserup =

Danish general

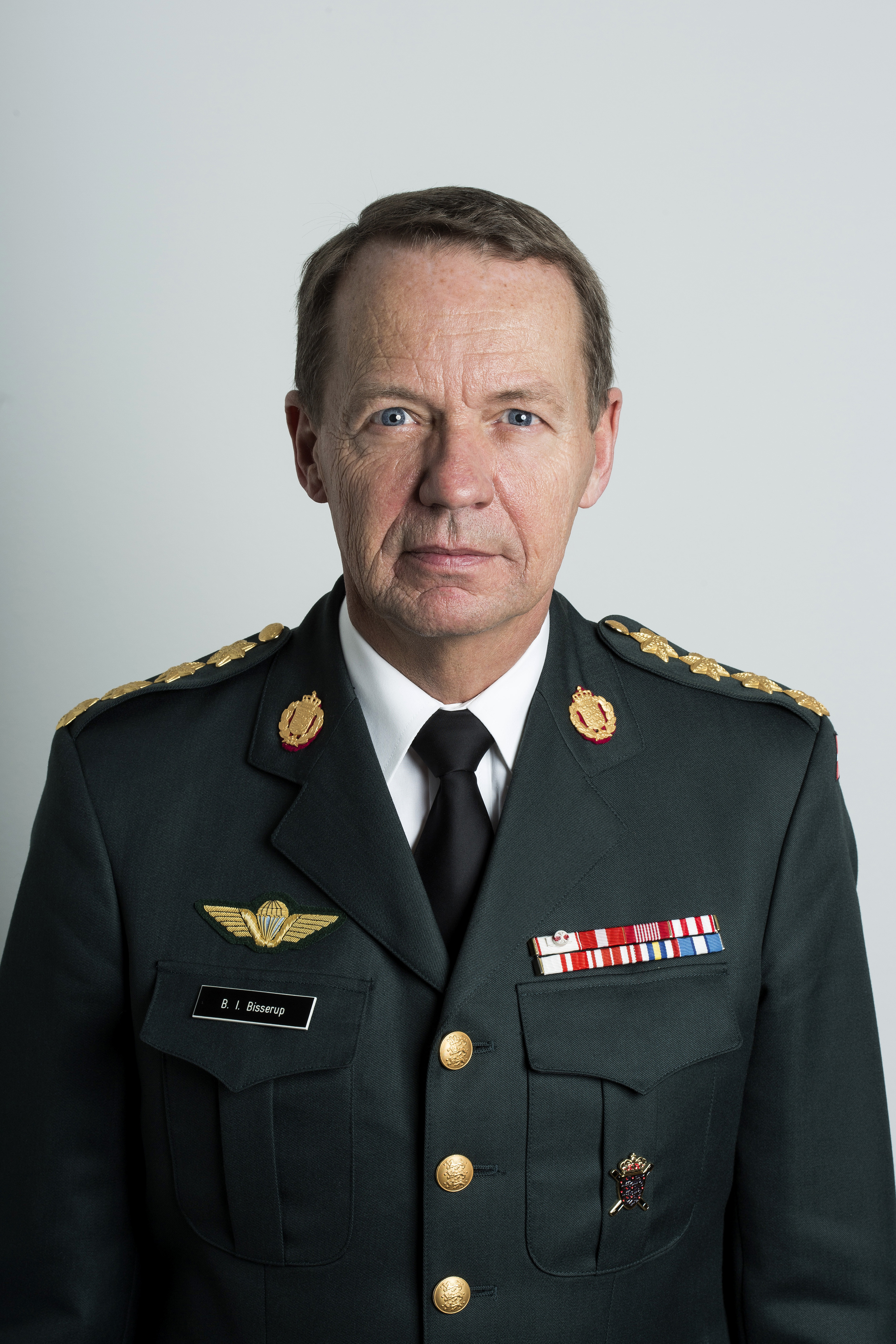
- Bisserup in 2017

Chief of Defence
- In office 10 January 2017 – 1 December 2020
- Preceded by: Peter Bartram
- Succeeded by: Flemming Lentfer

Personal details
- Born: 13 April 1960 (age 66) Copenhagen, Denmark
- Spouse: Maya Strandkvist Bisserup

Military service
- Allegiance: Denmark
- Branch/service: Royal Danish Army
- Years of service: 1982–2020
- Rank: General
- Commands: Battalion Chief of Royal Life Guards
- Awards: Commander of the Order of the Dannebrog

Bjørn Ingemann Bisserup (born 13 April 1960 in Copenhagen) is a Danish General, who served as acting Chief of Defence in 2009 and 2012, before becoming Chief of Defence in 2017. He left the role in December 2020.

== Background ==
He entered the Royal Danish Military Academy in 1982 and graduated in 1994, and also attended various courses at the Command and Staff Course I in 1991, and the Command and Staff Course II in 1994-1995 at the Royal Danish Defence College.

He served as a Platoon Commander in 1995-1986, served as an Administration Officer in 1986, and served as commander of the 2IC Company in 1988-1989 in the Danish Life Regiment. He also served as an Operations and Intelligence Officer of DANCON units at the United Nations Peacekeeping Force in Cyprus.

In 1990, he served as a Squadron Commander of the 2IC in the Danish Life Regiment and served as a Battalion Operations Officer at the same regiment in 1990-1991. In 1991-1994, he served as the Commanding Squadron Officer of the same regiment, until in 1995-1997, he served as a Staff Officer in the Logistics Branch if the Danish Defence Command. In 1997-2000, he served as a Staff Officer at the Danish Ministry of Defence, and in 2000-2002, he served as a Battalion Commander of the Royal Life Guards. He became the Head of Division at the Defense Ministry in 2003-2004 until he was appointed as the Deputy Permanent Secretary of State for Defence from 2004-2008.

While serving as Lieutenant General, Bisserup was on, 5 October 2009, appointed acting Chief of Defence in place of Admiral Tim Sloth Jørgensen. Sloth Jørgensen stopped as Chief of Defence due to the case of an Arabic translation of Thomas Rathsack's book Jæger - I Krig med Eliten. Bisserup remained on the post until the Defense Ministry appointed Knud Bartels to the post. The day after Tim Sloth Jørgensen's departure, Bisserup announced he did not want to assume the post permanently as he preferred to continue as the Chief of Operations and Planning Staffs at Forsvarskommandoen.

Bisserup was replaced as Chief of Defence 16 November 2009 by Lieutenant General Knud Bartels.

On 1 January 2012 Bisserup was again acting Chief of Defence, as Knud Bartels had to resign, to replace the Italian Admiral Giampaolo Di Paola as Chairman of the NATO Military Committee. Di Paola resigned to be Defense Minister in the Italian government.

On 20 March 2012 was Bisserup replaced by General Peter Bartram, who - after an unusual recruitment procedure (going from a Brigadier General to General in an afternoon), took the job as Chief of Defense.

He was announced to replace Bartram as Chief of Defence on 10 November 2016. He took over on 10 January 2017, and was simultaneously made general.

== Effective dates of promotion ==
Insignia	Rank	Date
	General	2017
	Lieutenant General	2008
	Major General	2008
	Colonel	2004
	Oberstløjtnant	2000
	Major	1995
	Kaptajn	1988
	Premierløjtnant	1986
	Løjtnant	1984

== Awards and decorations ==
Bisserup has been awarded:

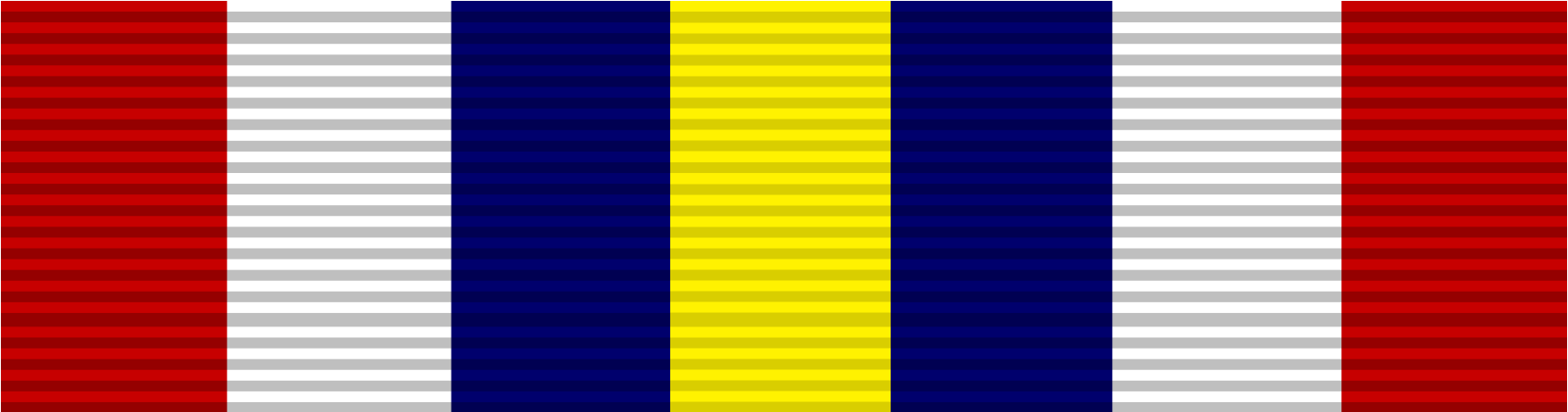
Commander of the Order of the Dannebrog
Army Long Service Medal
The Home Guard’s Order of Merit
Defense Medal for International Service 1948-2009
Rescue Preparedness Medal
The Reserve Officers Association of Denmark Medal of Honor
The Nordic Blue Berets Medal of Honour, in gold
UN Medal for UNFICYP

Other Accoutrements
Parachutist Badge

Military offices
Preceded by Tim Sloth Jørgensen	Acting Chief of Defence; 2009	Succeeded by Knud Bartels
Preceded by Knud Bartels	Acting Chief of Defence; 2012	Succeeded by Peter Bartram
Preceded by Peter Bartram	Chief of Defence; 2017-2020	Succeeded by Flemming Lentfer
Preceded by Hans J. Høyer	Acting Chief of the Defence Estates and Infrastructure Organisation; 13 December 2019 - 1 December 2020	Succeeded by Anders Branddahl
