= List of Danish full generals =

This is a list of full generals in the Royal Danish Army and Air Force. The rank of general (or full general to distinguish it from the lower general officer ranks) is the highest rank currently achievable by serving officers. It ranks above lieutenant general and was prior to 1842 below general field marshal.

== List of generals ==
=== 1700 ===
Portrait	Name (born–died)	Appointed	Retired	Service	Ref.
	Frederik Ahlefeldt (1662–1708)	1707	10 June 1708 #	Infantry	
	Poul Vendelbo Løvenørn (1686–1740)	1738	27 February 1740 #	Cavalry	
	Conrad Ahlefeldt (1707–1791)	1763	25 January 1771	Cavalry	
	Heinrich Wilhelm von Huth (1717–1806)	17 January 1772		Infantry	
	Ernest Frederick III, Duke of Saxe-Hildburghausen (1727–1780)	1763	3 July 1765	Infantry	
	Friedrich August von Finck (1718–1766)	21 October 1764	24 February 1766 #	Infantry	
	Andreas Hauch (1708–1782)	21 October 1774	19 May 1782 #	Infantry	
	Caspar Moltke (1738–1800)	11 October 1791	17 April 1800 #	Cavalry	
	Ernst Peymann (1737–1823)	2 January 1795	18 January 1809	Infantry	

=== 1800 ===
Portrait	Name (born–died)	Appointed	Retired	Branch	Ref.
	Crown Prince Frederick of Denmark (1768–1839)		3 December 1839 #	Royalty; Royal Danish Army	
	Frederik Carl Christian Ulrik Ahlefeldt Laurvigen (1742–1825)	22 February 1808	1808	Royal Danish Army	
	Adam Ludvig Moltke (1743–1810)	1 April 1808	11 March 1808	Royal Danish Army	
	Prince Frederik of Hesse (1771–1845)	1808	1842 (Note: Promoted to General field marshal in 1836.)	Royalty; Royal Danish Army	
	Joachim Castenschiold (1743–1817)	5 November 1809		Royal Danish Army	
	Prince Christian of Hesse (1776–1814)	1 January 1812	14 November 1814 #	Royalty; Royal Danish Army	
	Crown Prince Christian of Denmark (1786–1848)	28 January 1812	20 January 1848 #	Royalty; Royal Danish Army	
	Emil of Slesvig-Holsten-Sønderborg-Augustenborg (1767–1841)	31 July 1815	?	Royal Danish Army	
	Carl Friederich Bielefeldt (1752–1825)	1815	?	Royal Danish Army	
	Ferdinand, Hereditary Prince of Denmark (1792–1863)	1 August 1829	29 June 1863 #	Royalty; Royal Danish Army	
	Frantz Bülow (1769–1844)	1 January 1840 (À la suite)		Royal Danish Army	
	Otto von Blome (1770–1849)	27 February 1841	?	Royal Danish Army	
	Frederik Caspar Conrad Frieboe (1767–1846)	1 July 1842 (À la suite)		Royal Danish Army	
	Frederick VII of Denmark (1808–1863)	20 January 1848	15 November 1863 #	Royalty	
	Prince William of Hesse-Kassel (1787–1867)	28 February 1848	5 September 1867 #	Royalty	
	Christian IX of Denmark (1818–1906)	15 November 1863	29 January 1906 #	Royalty	
	Christian de Meza (1792–1865)	19 December 1864	1 April 1865 (À la suite)	Royal Danish Army	
	Otto Bülow (1812–1895)	18 September 1867	3 April 1882	Royal Danish Army	
	Gustav Castenskiold (1815–1886)	18 September 1867	8 August 1885	Royal Danish Army	
	Frederik Dreyer (1814–1898)	18 September 1867	31 March 1881	Royal Danish Army	
	Henri de Dompierre de Jonquières (1816–1879)	18 September 1867	?	Royal Danish Army	
	Friedemann Maximilian Müller (1808–1884)	18 September 1867	1 January 1879	Royal Danish Army	
	Johan Waldemar Neergaard (1810–1879)	18 September 1867	14 December 1877	Royal Danish Army	
	Georg Julius Wilhelm Nielsen (1811–1891)	18 September 1867	1 April 1881	Royal Danish Army	
	Paul Scharffenberg (1810–1882)	18 September 1867	21 April 1879	Royal Danish Army	
	Peter Frederik Steinmann (1812–1894)	18 September 1867 14 December 1877	11 June 1875 3 April 1882	Royal Danish Army	
	Frederik Stiernholm (1822–1879)	18 September 1867	21 April 1879	Royal Danish Army	
	Wilhelm Carl Bernt Stricker (1817–1885)	18 September 1867	26 August 1885 #	Royal Danish Army	
	Ernst Wilster (1808–1881)	18 September 1867	14 December 1877	Royal Danish Army	
	Philipp Wörishöffer (1804–1892)	18 September 1867	2 April 1874	Royal Danish Army	
	Crown Prince Frederik of Denmark (1843–1912)	18 September 1867	14 May 1912 #	Royalty	
	Ernst du Plat (1816–1892)	24 September 1870		Royal Danish Army	
	Edvard Valentin Schreiber (1822–1892)	8 October 1870	13 November 1889	Royal Danish Army	
	Wolfgang von Haffner (1810–1887)	30 August 1871 (À la suite)	23 December 1872	Royal Danish Army	
	Carl Wolle (1813–1893)	22 April 1874		Royal Danish Army	
	Christian Bauditz (1815–1909)	23 April 1874	29 January 1885	Royal Danish Army	
	Christian Albert Frederik Thomsen (1827–1896)	16 July 1874; Out of number	?	Royal Danish Army	
	Stephan Ankjær (1820–1892)	16 July 1874	15 October 1888	Royal Danish Army	
	Poul Egede Glahn (1811–1896)	17 December 1876 (À la suite)		Royal Danish Army	
	Jacob Ernst (1820–1897)	31 July 1877	21 July 1890	Royal Danish Army	
	Wilhelm Kauffmann (1821–1892)	1 January 1879	18 March 1891	Royal Danish Army	
	Lorentz August Bie (1815–1891)	10 January 1879	29 January 1885	Royal Danish Army	
	Johan Ditlev Høst (1818–1882)	21 April 1879	9 February 1882	Royal Danish Army	
	Ludolph Fog (1825–1897)	21 April 1879	1895	Royal Danish Army	
	Heinrich Theodor Wenck (1810–1885)	15 December 1879 (À la suite)		Royal Danish Army	
	Prince Wilhelm of Schleswig-Holstein-Sonderburg-Glücksburg (1816–1893)	1880	5 September 1893 #	Royalty	

=== 1900 ===
Portrait	Name (born–died)	Appointed	Retired	Branch	Ref.
	Gustaf V of Sweden (1858–1950)	20 December 1907	29 October 1950 #	Royalty	
	Edward VII of England (1841–1910)	22 April 1908	6 May 1910 #	Royalty	
	Franz Joseph I of Austria (1830–1916)	11 May 1908	21 November 1916 #	Royalty	
	Christian X of Denmark (1870–1947)	15 May 1912	20 April 1947 #	Royalty	
	Frederick Francis IV of Mecklenburg-Schwerin (1882–1945)	19 July 1913	17 November 1945 #	Royalty	
	George VI of the United Kingdom (1895–1952)	13 December 1937	6 February 1952 #	Royalty	
	Gustaf VI Adolf of Sweden (1882–1973)	24 March 1952	15 September 1973 #	Royalty	
	Frederik IX of Denmark (1899–1972)	20 April 1947	14 January 1972 #	Royalty	
	Kurt Ramberg (1908–1997)	1 October 1962	30 November 1973	Royal Danish Air Force	
	Otto Blixenkrone-Møller (1912–2006)	1 December 1972	30 April 1977	Royal Danish Army	
	Knud Jørgensen (1919–1990)	1 May 1977	30 September 1984	Royal Danish Army	
	Henrik, Prince Consort of Denmark (1967–2018)	1981	13 February 2018 #	Royalty	
	Otto K. Lind (1920–2000)	1 October 1984	30 November 1985	Royal Danish Army	
	Jørgen Lyng (born 1934)	1 November 1989	31 March 1996	Royal Danish Army	
	Christian Hvidt (born 1942)	20 August 1996	30 September 2002	Royal Danish Air Force	

=== 2000 ===
Portrait	Name (born–died)	Appointed	Retired	Branch	Ref.
	Hans Jesper Helsø (born 1948)	1 October 2002	31 July 2008	Royal Danish Army	
	Knud Bartels (born 1948)	16 November 2009	15 July 2015	Royal Danish Army	
	Peter Bartram (born 1961)	20 March 2012	10 January 2017	Royal Danish Army	
	Bjørn Bisserup (born 1960)	10 January 2017	1 December 2020	Royal Danish Army	
	Flemming Lentfer (born 1964)	1 December 2020	3 April 2024	Royal Danish Air Force	
	Frederik X of Denmark (born 1968)	14 January 2024		Royalty	
	Michael Hyldgaard (born 1964)	3 April 2024		Royal Danish Army	

== See also ==
- General (Denmark)
