= Flemming Lentfer =

Danish general

Flemming Lentfer K
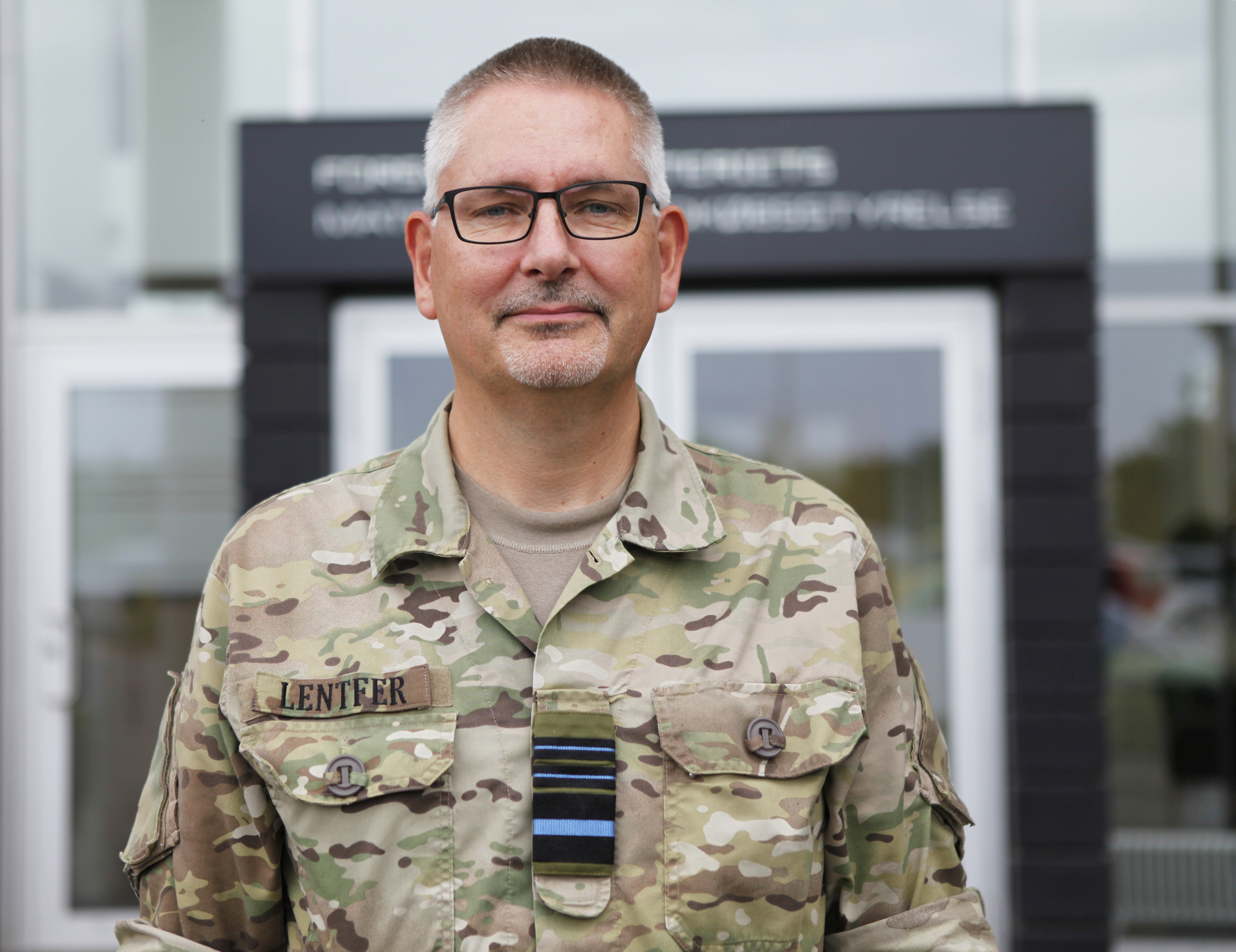
- Lentfer as Generalløjtnant, 2020

Chief of Defence
- In office 1 December 2020 – 3 April 2024
- Minister: Trine Bramsen; Morten Bødskov; Jakob Ellemann-Jensen; Troels Lund Poulsen
- Preceded by: Bjørn Bisserup
- Succeeded by: Michael Hyldgaard

Personal details
- Born: 1 March 1964 (age 62) Copenhagen, Denmark

Military service
- Allegiance: Denmark
- Branch/service: Royal Danish Air Force
- Years of service: 1983–
- Rank: General
- Commands: Chief of Defence; Director, Danish Ministry of Defence Acquisition and Logistics, Organisation and National Armaments; Defence Command, Chief Joint Operations; Joint Operations Staff, Defence Command; HAWK Battalion West
- Awards: Commander of the Order of the Dannebrog

Flemming Lentfer is a Danish General, who served as Chief of Defence from 1 December 2020 to 3 April 2024. Prior to Lentfer becoming Chief of Defence, he served as Director for the Danish Defence Acquisition and Logistics Organization and National Armaments Director.

== Career ==
Lentfer entered the Royal Danish Military Academy in 1983 and graduated in 1985. He then went to the Royal Danish Air Force Academy in 1985 and graduated in 1988. In 1991 he took the Junior Staff Course at Royal Danish Defence College. He took the Officer's Advanced Course at the Royal Danish Air Force Academy during 1991 and 1992, and returned to the Academy to take the Senior Staff Course in 1995 and 1996.

From 1988 to 1993 Flemming served at the SAM Squadron 541, and he was a Staff Officer at the Defence Command from 1993 to 1995. He served as a syndicate leader and instructor on operations and logistics at the Royal Danish Defence College from 1996 to 1998, and served as Secretary in the Danish Defence Commission. In 1999 and 2000, he served at the Ministry of Defence as a Staff Officer, and served as the Head of Branch at the Royal Danish Air Force Academy.

Flemming became the commander of the HAWK Battalion West from 2000 to 2002, and served at the Head of Plans and Programmes Branch at the Defence Command from 2002 to 2005. He became the Chief of Plans and Programmes Division at the Defence Command from 2005 to 2010, and served at the Defence Acquisition and Logistics Organisation, Chief of Acquisition and Planning Organization from 2010 to 2011. He returned to the Defence Command to serve as the Chief of Staff, Policy and Coordination, from 2011 to 2015, and served as Defence Command Denmark, Chief Joint Operations from 2015 to 2017.

He served as the Director, Danish Ministry of Defence Acquisition and Logistics, Organisation and National Armaments from 2017 to 2020, before being appointed as the Chief of Defence since 1 December 2020. He was fired from the position on 3 April 2024 by Deputy Prime Minister of Denmark and Minister for Defence Troels Lund Poulsen after failing to inform the government about long-standing problems with the weapons systems onboard the frigate Ivar Huitfeldt. The frigate's air defences subsequently failed during armed combat against Houthi militants.

== Effective dates of promotion ==
Insignia	Rank	Date
	General	2020
	Generalløjtnant	2017
	Generalmajor	2011
	Brigadegeneral (temporary)	2010
	Oberst	2005
	Oberstløjtnant	2000
	Major	1996
	Kaptajn	1992
	Premierløjtnant	1988

== Awards and decorations ==
Lentfer has been awarded:

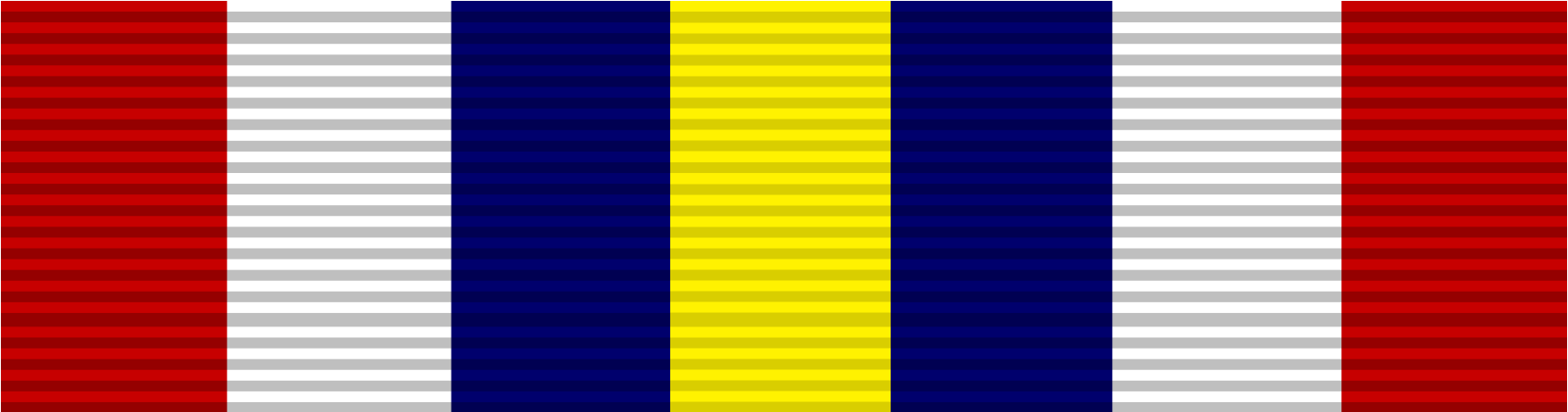
Commander of the Order of the Dannebrog
Air Force Long Service Medal
The Reserve Officers Association of Denmark Medal of Honor
Home Guard's Head Sign
Commandeur, French Legion of Honour

Other Accoutrements
Parachutist Badge

Military offices
Preceded by Bjørn Bisserup	Chief of Defence; 2020-2024	Succeeded by Michael Hyldgaard (acting)
