= Defence Staff (Denmark) =

- Forsvarsstaben
- Founded: 1 October 1950; 75 years ago
- Country: Kingdom of Denmark
- Part of: Defence Command
- Headquarters: Holmen Naval Base
- Website: Official website

Commanders
- Chief of the Defence Staff: Lieutenant general Kenneth Pedersen

The Danish Defence Staff (Danish: Forsvarsstaben) is a senior command authority within the Danish Defence, responsible for leadership, administration, and staff support.

== Role ==
The Defense Staff is part of the Defense Command and supports the Chief of Defence with operational management and administration of the defense. There are five department within the Defense Staff:

- Executive Office
- Plans and Capability
- Joint Operations
- Finance and Management
- InterForce Executive Office

== Chief of the Defense Staff ==
The Chief of the Defense Staff reports directly to the Chief of Defense and serves as his deputy. The person in question is also responsible for ensuring that the Armed Forces 'resources are utilized optimally, so that the Armed Forces' tasks are solved in the best possible way. The Chief of the Defense Staff, together with the Chief of Defense, constitutes the top management of the Defense.

List

No.	Portrait	Name (Birth–Death)	Term of office			Defence branch	Ref.
No.	Portrait	Name (Birth–Death)	Took office	Left office	Time in office	Defence branch	Ref.
1		Major general Einar M. Nordentoft (1896–1968)	13 October 1950	30 September 1956	5 years, 353 days	Army	
2		Major general Poul Vilhelm Hammershøy (1905–1961)	1 October 1956	30 September 1959	2 years, 364 days	Army	
3		Major general Erik Rasmussen (1903–1972)	1 October 1959	30 September 1962	2 years, 364 days	Air force	
4		Major general Svend Børge Reimert Helsø (1910–1975)	1 October 1962	30 November 1970	8 years, 60 days	Army	
5		Major general Eigil Wolff (1914–1983)	1 January 1970	30 November 1972	2 years, 334 days	Army	
6		Major general Knud Jørgensen (1919–1990)	1 December 1972	30 April 1977	4 years, 150 days	Air force	
7		Lieutenant general Gunnar Kjær Kristensen (1928–2001)	1 May 1977	30 April 1983	5 years, 364 days	Army	
8		Vice admiral Sven Egil Thiede (1924–2005)	1 May 1983	30 November 1985	2 years, 213 days	Navy	
9		Lieutenant general Jørgen Lyng (born 1934)	1 December 1985	31 October 1989	3 years, 334 days	Army	
10		Vice admiral Jørgen Garde (1939–1996)	1 November 1989	31 March 1996	6 years, 151 days	Navy	
11		Lieutenant general Christian Hvidt (born 1942)	1 April 1996	20 August 1996	141 days	Air force	
12		Lieutenant general Ove Høegh-Guldberg Hoff (born 1942)	20 August 1996	29 February 2000	3 years, 193 days	Army	
13		Lieutenant general Hans Jesper Helsø (born 1942)	1 March 2000	1 October 2002	2 years, 214 days	Army	
14		Vice admiral Tim Sloth Jørgensen (born 1951)	1 October 2002	31 July 2008	5 years, 304 days	Navy	
15		Lieutenant general Bjørn Bisserup (born 1960)	31 July 2008	1 October 2014	6 years, 62 days	Army	
16		Lieutenant general Per Ludvigsen (born 1957)	1 October 2014	1 November 2017	3 years, 31 days	Army	
17		Lieutenant general Max A.L.T. Nielsen (born 1963)	1 November 2017	1 September 2019	1 year, 304 days	Air force	
–		Rear admiral Frank Trojahn (born 1963) acting	1 September 2019	15 November 2019	75 days	Navy	
18		Lieutenant general Kenneth Pedersen (born 1968)	15 November 2019	1 August 2025	5 years, 259 days	Army	
19		Lieutenant general Henrik Berg (born 1964)	1 December 2025	Incumbent	151 days	Army	
