= Peter Bartram =

Danish general

Peter Bartram K1
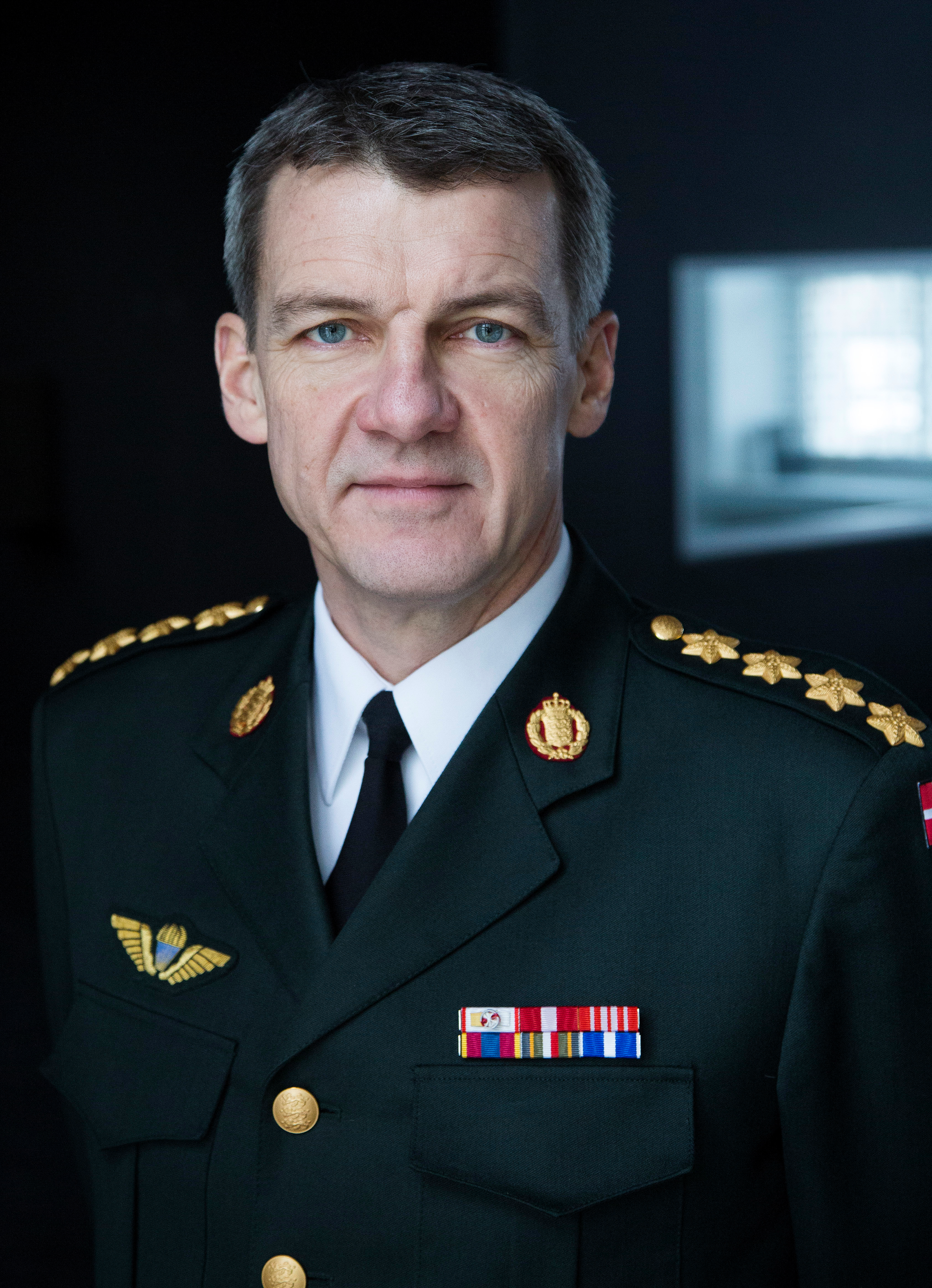
- General Peter Bartram
- Born: 4 May 1961 (age 65); Aarhus, Denmark
- Spouse: Juliane Bartram
- Military career
- Allegiance: Denmark
- Branch: Royal Danish Army
- Service years: 1981 – 2017
- Rank: General
- Commands: Chief of Defence (Denmark)
- Awards: Grand Cross of the Order of the Dannebrog; 25 Years Good Service Medal
- Website: peterbartram.dk

Peter Bartram (4 May 1961 in Aarhus) is a former Danish general and Danish Chief of Defence.

Bartram was appointed as Danish Chief of Defence on 20 March 2012 after passing tests promoting him from directly from colonel to General. He succeeded Lieutenant General Bjørn Ingemann Bisserup who was acting Chief of Defence after Knud Bartels left the post for Chairman of the NATO Military Committee.

As the Danish Chief of Defence, General Peter Bartram was the military advisor to the Minister of Defence. He was responsible for the organisation, training and operations of the Defence.

On 28 October 2016, Bartram announce he would be leaving the post, to work for a "large Danish company". On 11 January 2017, Bartram left the post as Chief of Defence, and became Vice Chairman at JP/Politikens Hus and Vice Chairman at Jyllands-Postens Fond.

== Awards and decorations ==
General Peter Bartram has been awarded several medals including:

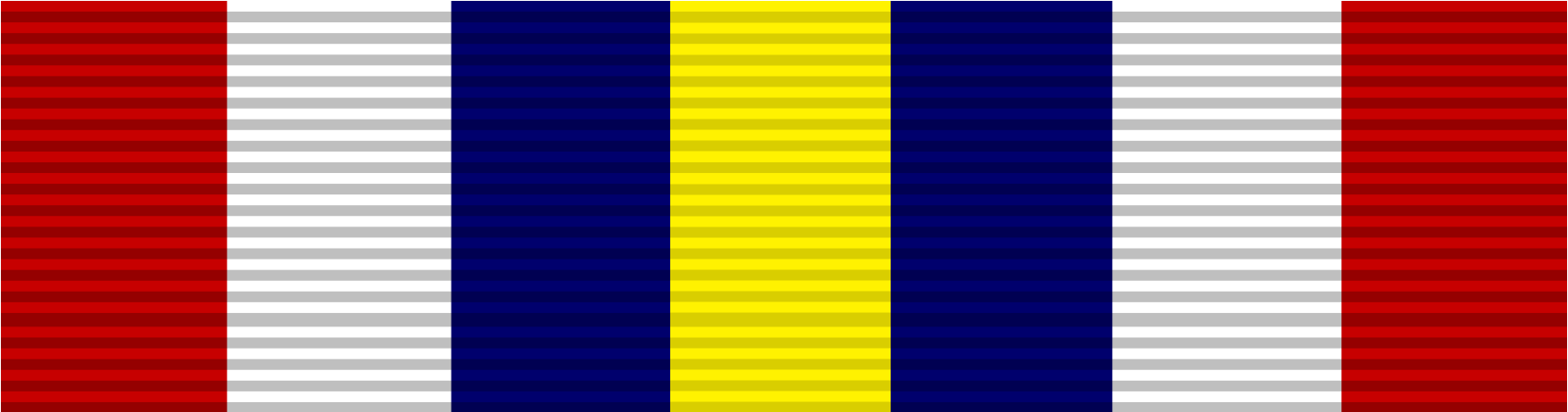
Commander 1. class of the Order of Dannebrog
The Civil Defense Long Service Medal
25 Years of Good Service
Badge of Honor of the League of Civil Defense
Defence Medal for International Service 1948 - 2009
French Defence medal in Gold
The Polish Army Medal in Bronze
NATO Medal for KFOR
The Nordic Blue Berets Medal of Honour

Other Accoutrements
Parachutist Badge

Military offices
Preceded by Bjørn Bisserup (acting)	Chief of Defence; 2012-2017	Succeeded by Bjørn Bisserup
