= Danish Defence Estates and Infrastructure Organisation =

Danish Estate Command
- Etablissement- og Terrænkommandoen (Danish)
- Active: 1952; 74 years ago
- Type: Military engineering
- Role: Building; Construction; Maintenance projects
- Size: 1,800
- Reports to: Chief of Defence
- Website: Official website(in Danish)

Commanders
- Current commander: Mikkel Enemark Olsen

The Danish Estate Command (Danish: Etablissement- og Terrænkommandoen; ETK), directly under the Chief of Defence. It was created in 2025 after the Danish Ministry of Defence Estate Agency (Forsvarsministeriets Ejendomsstyrelse) was reorganized, due to the Defence Agreement 2024–2033.

== Organization ==
The Estate Command holds the authority that handles all construction and building projects for all other authorities under the Danish Ministry of Defence. It does not actually do the building itself, but rather is the project manager and works out all the plans on how it should be done and who should do it.

The Estate Command is also responsible for such things as property assessments, selling and buying property, legal consultation, preservations, energy, environmental issues. It also administrates the Danish Defence's 700 rental properties.

== History ==
=== Defence Construction Service ===
Logo for the Defence Construction Service

The Estate Command can trace its history back to 1684, when King Christian V setup three fortifications services for Denmark, Schleswig-Holstein and Norway. In 1952, the Army Construction Service, merged with Navy Construction Service and Coast Fortification Service, to form the Defence Construction Service (Danish: Forsvarets Bygningstjeneste/FBT).

=== Construction and Establishments Service ===
In January 2007, due to the Defence agreement 2005-2009, significant changes took take place in Defence Construction Service, which is to eventually evolve into Construction and Establishments Service (Danish: Forsvarets Bygnings- og Etablissementstjeneste/FBE), by incorporating decentralized departments located in various military regiments, as well as the Defence Command's infrastructure department, for a more streamlined organization. In 2014, the name was changed to Danish Ministry of Defence Estate Agency (Forsvarsministeriets Ejendomsstyrelse/FES) and place under the Ministry of Defence, as part of the Defence Agreement 2013-17.

=== Misuse of funds ===
In December 2019, it was reported that there were violations of rules in 75 percent of the purchases related to the DDEO. In extreme cases, payment was given to tasks which were never completed. As a result, the director of the DDEO, Hans J. Høyer, was removed from his post and Chief of Defence Bjørn Bisserup was made acting director.

== Commanding officer ==
No.	Portrait	Name (born–died)	Term of office			Ref.
No.	Portrait	Name (born–died)	Took office	Left office	Time in office	Ref.
Forsvarets Bygningstjeneste
1		Lieutenant colonel Palle Bolten Jagd (1918–1988)	1 November 1952	1979	26–27 years	
Forsvarsministeriets Ejendomsstyrelse
		Hans J. Høyer (born )	2013	10 December 2019	5–6 years	
–		General; Bjørn Bisserup (born 1960) acting	13 December 2019	1 December 2020	354 days	
–		Major general Anders Mærkedahl Pedersen (born c. 1968)	1 December 2020	1 April 2021	121 days	
		Major general Anders Mærkedahl Pedersen (born c. 1968)	1 April 2021	7 March 2025	3 years, 340 days	
Etablissement- og Terrænkommandoen
–		Henrik Sørensen (born ) acting	7 March 2025	1 August 2026	1 year, 147 days	
		Major general Mikkel Enemark Olsen (born 1972)	1 August 2026	Incumbent	71 days	
