= Ray Henault =

Royal Canadian Air Force general

General Ray Henault CM CMM MSC CD
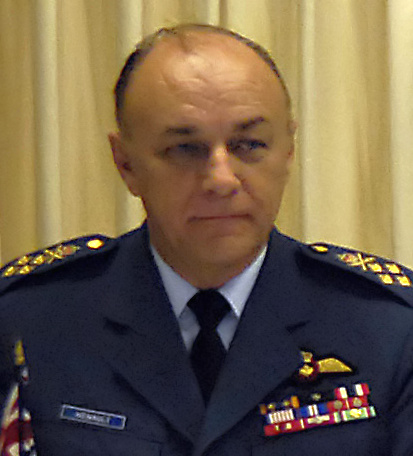
- Henault in 2007
- Born: Raymond Roland Joseph Henault; April 26, 1949 (age 77); Winnipeg, Manitoba, Canada
- Alma mater: University of Manitoba (BA, LLD honoris causa); National Defence College; École supérieure de guerre
- Military career
- Allegiance: Canada
- Branch: Air Command
- Service years: 1968–2008
- Rank: General
- Commands: Chairman of the NATO Military Committee; Chief of the Defence Staff; Deputy Chief of Defence Staff; Assistant Chief of Air Staff; Chief of Staff for Operations; Directorate of Land Aviation; CFB Portage la Prairie; 10 Tactical Air Group; 444 Tactical Helicopter Squadron
- Conflicts: Kosovo War
- Awards: Member of the Order of Canada; Commander of the Order of Military Merit; Meritorious Service Cross; Canadian Forces' Decoration; Commander of the Order of St. John

General Raymond Roland Joseph Henault (born April 26, 1949) is a retired Canadian Air Force officer. He was the Chief of the Defence Staff of Canada from June 28, 2001 to June 17, 2005 and then Chairman of the NATO Military Committee from 2005 until 2008, when he retired.

== Education ==
Born in Winnipeg, Manitoba, Canada, Henault is fluent in both English and French. He graduated from both the École supérieure de guerre Aerienne in Paris and the National Defence College of Canada in Kingston. He holds a Bachelor of Arts degree, and an honorary Doctor of Laws, from the University of Manitoba.

== Military career ==
Henault enrolled in the Canadian Forces in 1968. On completion of pilot training at CFB Borden, Ontario, and CFB Gimli, Manitoba, Henault was transferred to CFB Bagotville, Québec, where he served as a CF-101 Voodoo pilot with 425 Squadron. In 1972, he became a flight instructor on the Musketeer at CFB Portage la Prairie. In 1974, he served a second tour at CFB Bagotville, this time as an air traffic controller.

In 1976, Henault was posted to 408 Squadron at CFB Edmonton, Alberta, to fly the CH-135 Twin Huey helicopter. In 1980 he moved to CFB Valcartier, Québec, as Staff Officer (Aviation) in 5 Canadian Brigade Group Headquarters. In 1981, he was promoted to the rank of major and transferred to 430^{e} Escadron at CFB Valcartier, where he served as the Twin Huey Flight Commander.

In January 1985, he came to National Defence Headquarters in Ottawa to assume responsibility for Doctrine and International Programs in the Directorate of Land Aviation. He was promoted to the rank of lieutenant-colonel in June 1985, and appointed Project Director for the Canadian Forces Light Helicopter Project at NDHQ.

In June 1987, Henault was appointed the Commanding Officer of 444(CA) Tactical Helicopter Squadron at CFB Lahr, Germany. In June 1989, he was transferred to Air Command Headquarters in Winnipeg as Senior Staff Officer Requirements. He was promoted to the rank of colonel in July 1990, and appointed Base Commander of CFB Portage la Prairie, Manitoba. In July 1992, he was appointed the Deputy Commander of 10 Tactical Air Group at CFB Montreal. In August 1993, he was posted to the National Defence College in Kingston, Ontario to attend Course No. 47.

He was promoted to the rank of brigadier-general in May 1994, and assumed command of 10 Tactical Air Group headquartered in Montreal, Quebec. In July 1995, he was posted to Air Command Headquarters and appointed Chief of Staff Operations.

From June to December 1996, General Henault served as Chief of Staff J3/Director-General Military Plans and Operations at National Defence Headquarters in Ottawa. From January to October 1997, Henault was appointed Acting Deputy Chief of the Defence Staff. He was promoted to the rank of major-general on 1 April 1997.

From September 1997 to September 1998, Henault served as Assistant Chief of the Air Staff. On 15 August 1998 he was promoted to the rank of lieutenant-general and served as Deputy Chief of the Defence Staff from September 1998 to June 2001. Henault was promoted to his present rank and appointed Chief of the Defence Staff on 28 June 2001.

He holds the rank of Commander of the Order of Military Merit (CMM), The Most Venerable Order of the Hospital of St. John of Jerusalem (Serving Member), and Commander of the French Legion of Honour.

Henault was elected to the position of Chairman of the NATO Military Committee in November 2004 and assumed that position at NATO headquarters in Brussels, Belgium in June 2005. He held that position until 2008, when he finally retired from the military and returned to Canada.

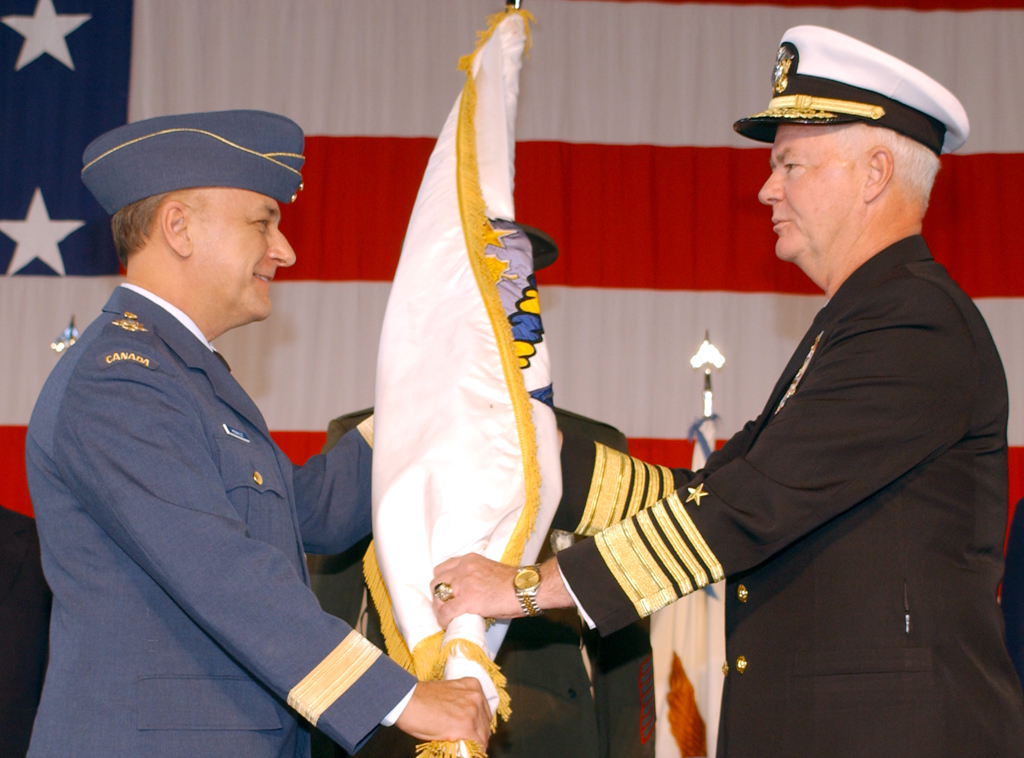
Henault (left)

== Post-military career ==
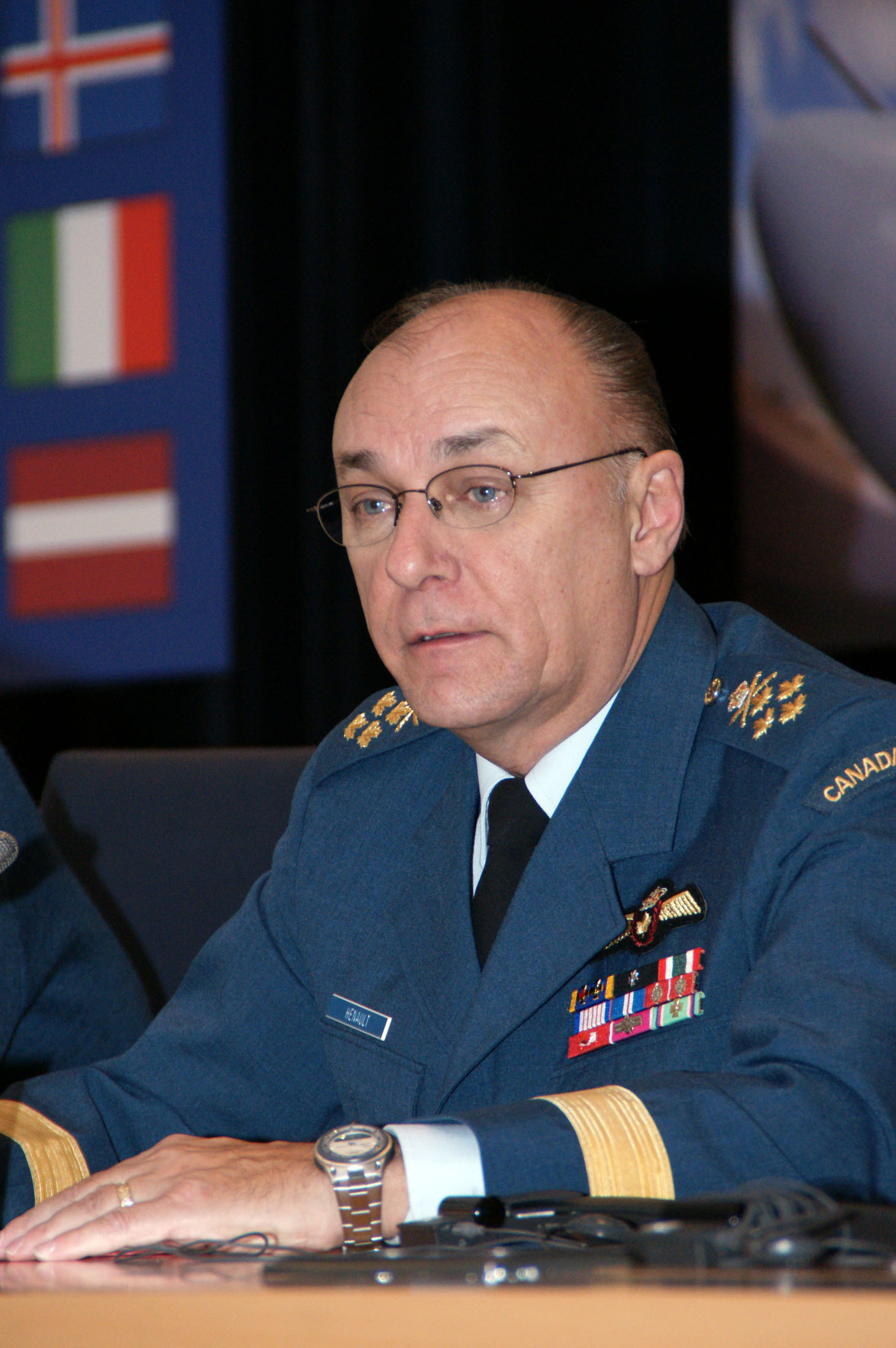

ADGA RHEA Group of Companies, an engineering consulting company, appointed Henault Chairman of their Strategic Advisory Board in November 2008. In 2013, Henault joined the board of directors of the Pearson Centre. In August 2013, he was appointed Governor to the Board of Governors of New Westminster College.

== Personal life ==
He currently resides in Courtenay, British Columbia.

== Awards ==
He was awarded an Honorary Doctorate of Philosophy in Military Science from the Royal Military College of Canada in 2005, and in 2006 an Honorary Professorship at the University of Pecs in Hungary.

The Manitoba branch of the Royal Military Colleges Club of Canada awarded Henault the 2008 recipient the Birchall Leadership Award in July. He was awarded the Order of Military Merit, and received the Meritorious Service Cross in November 2009. He was awarded United States Legion Of Merit at the rank of Commander; French Legion of Honour at the rank of Commander; Czech Cross of Merit at the rank of Commander; Belgian Order of the Grand Croix at the rank of Commander; and the Commander's Cross of the Order of Merit of Hungary. He has also been awarded: the Ukrainian Medal of Honour, NATO Meritorious Service Cross, Commander of the Most Venerable Order of the Hospital of St. John of Jerusalem, and the Queen Elizabeth II Diamond Jubilee Medal.

He was appointed as a Member of the Order of Canada in 2023.

== Honours and decorations ==
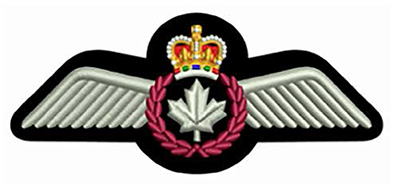

Ribbon	Description	Notes
	Member of the Order of Canada	Awarded in 2023
	Order of Military Merit (CMM)	Awarded Commander in 2016
	Order of St John of Jerusalem	Degree of Commander
	Meritorious Service Cross (MSC)	
	Special Service Medal	
	125th Anniversary of the Confederation of Canada Medal	
	Queen Elizabeth II's Golden Jubilee Medal	
	Queen Elizabeth II's Diamond Jubilee Medal	
	Canadian Forces' Decoration (CD)	32 Years of Service in the Canadian Forces
	Legion of Merit	Degree of Commander
	Legion d'Honneur	Degree of Commander
	Cross of Merit of the Minister of Defence of the Czech Republic	Degree of Commander
	Belgian Order of the Grand Cross	Degree of Commander
	Medal for Strengthening Defence of Ukraine	
	Cross of the Order of Merit of Hungary	
	NATO Meritorious Service Medal	

Military offices
Preceded by J. G. M. Baril	Chief of the Defence Staff; 2001–2005	Succeeded by R. J. Hillier
Preceded by Harald Kujat	Chairman of the NATO Military Committee; 2005–2008	Succeeded by Giampaolo Di Paola
