= Walter Edward Gaskin Sr =

United States Marine Corps general

Walter E. Gaskin
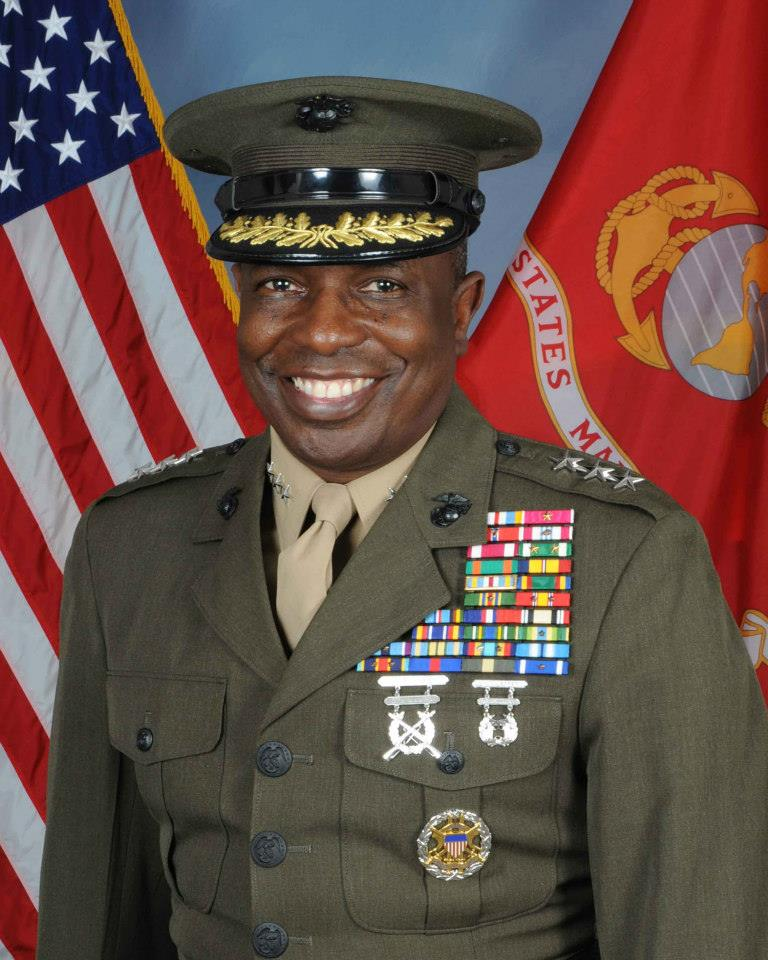
- Military career
- Allegiance: United States
- Branch: United States Marine Corps
- Service years: 1974–2013
- Rank: Lieutenant General
- Commands: Deputy Chair of the NATO Military Committee; 2nd Marine Division; Marine Corps Recruiting; 22nd Marine Expeditionary Unit; 2nd Battalion, 2nd Marines
- Conflicts: Iraq War
- Awards: Defense Distinguished Service Medal; Defense Superior Service Medal (2); Legion of Merit (2); Bronze Star Medal
- Other work: Secretary of the North Carolina Department of Military and Veterans Affairs (2021-2024); CEO La Porte Technology Defense; Board of Directors, Institute for Defense & Business

(acting) Chairman of the NATO Military Committee
- In office 18 November 2011 – 2 January 2012
- Preceded by: Giampaolo Di Paola
- Succeeded by: Knud Bartels

Walter Edward Gaskin Sr. is a retired United States Marine Corps lieutenant general who served as the 19th Deputy Chairman of the NATO Military Committee from May 2009 to August 2013. In that role, he served as Acting Chairman of the NATO Military Committee from November 2011 to January 2012. He was the first African American to be appointed as deputy chairman and chairman of the NATO Military Committee.

In January 2021, North Carolina Governor Roy Cooper named Gaskin the next Secretary of the North Carolina Department of Military and Veterans Affairs. Gaskin stepped down from the position in April 1, 2024.

== Early life and education ==
Walter Edward Gaskin was born and raised in Savannah, Georgia. He attended Savannah State University on a Naval ROTC scholarship, earning a bachelor of science degree. Upon graduation in 1974, he was commissioned a 2nd Lieutenant in the United States Marine Corps.

While in the Marine Corps, Gaskin continued his formal education. He earned a master's degree in Public Administration from the University of Oklahoma in 1992. He has also completed the Senior Executive Seminar from the JFK School of Government, Harvard University, in 2002.

His professional military education includes The Basic School and Amphibious Warfare School (1982–83) in Quantico; the United States Army Command and Staff College, Leavenworth, Kansas (1986–1987); the Army War College, Carlisle Barracks, Carlisle, Pennsylvania (1993–1994); and the Combined/Joint Force Land Component Command (C/JFLCC) Course, Carlisle Barracks, Carlisle, Pennsylvania (2009).

== Marine Corps career ==
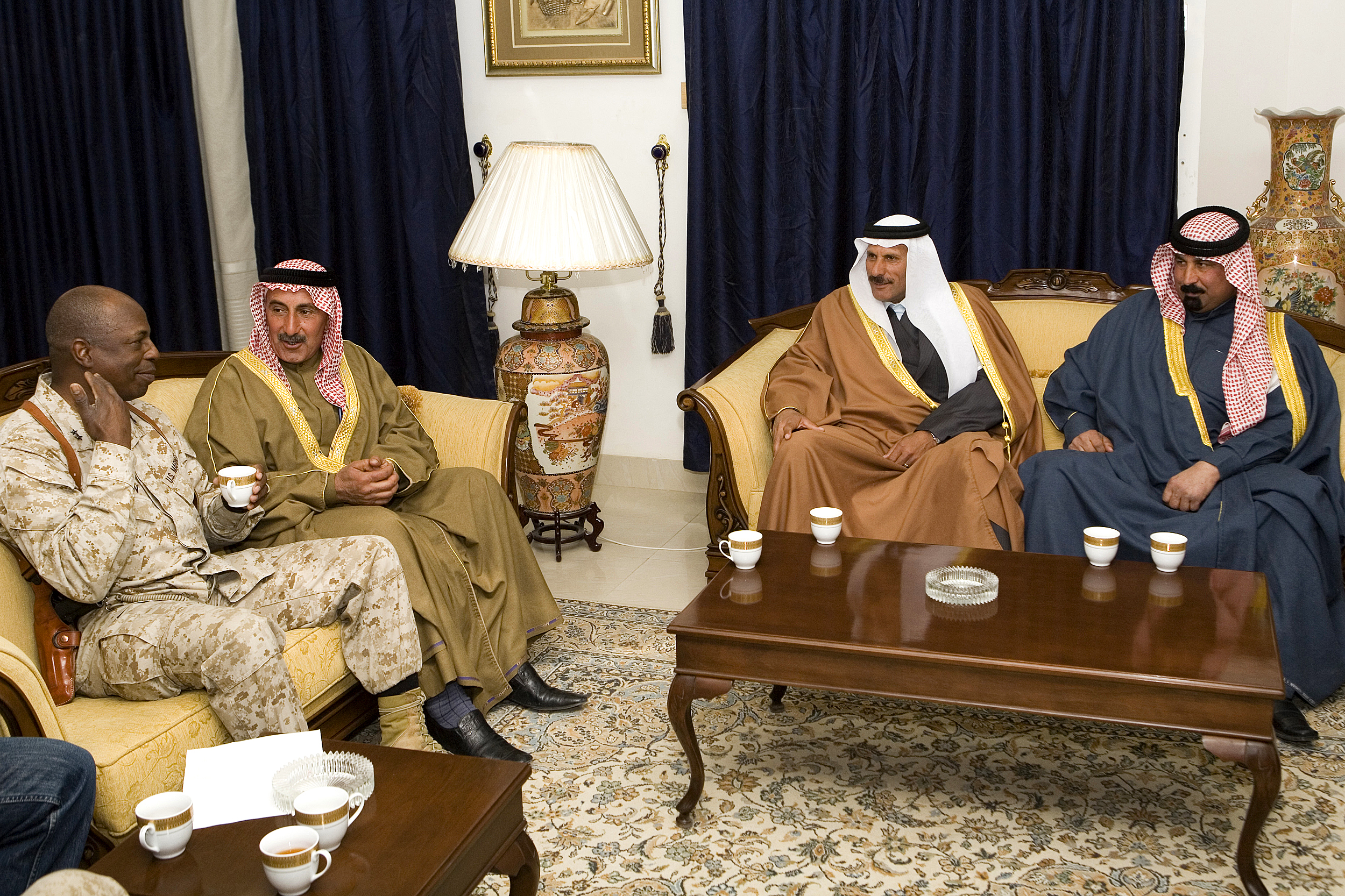
Major General Gaskin, CG of MNF-W meeting with local Sheiks of Al Anbar Province, Jan 2008.

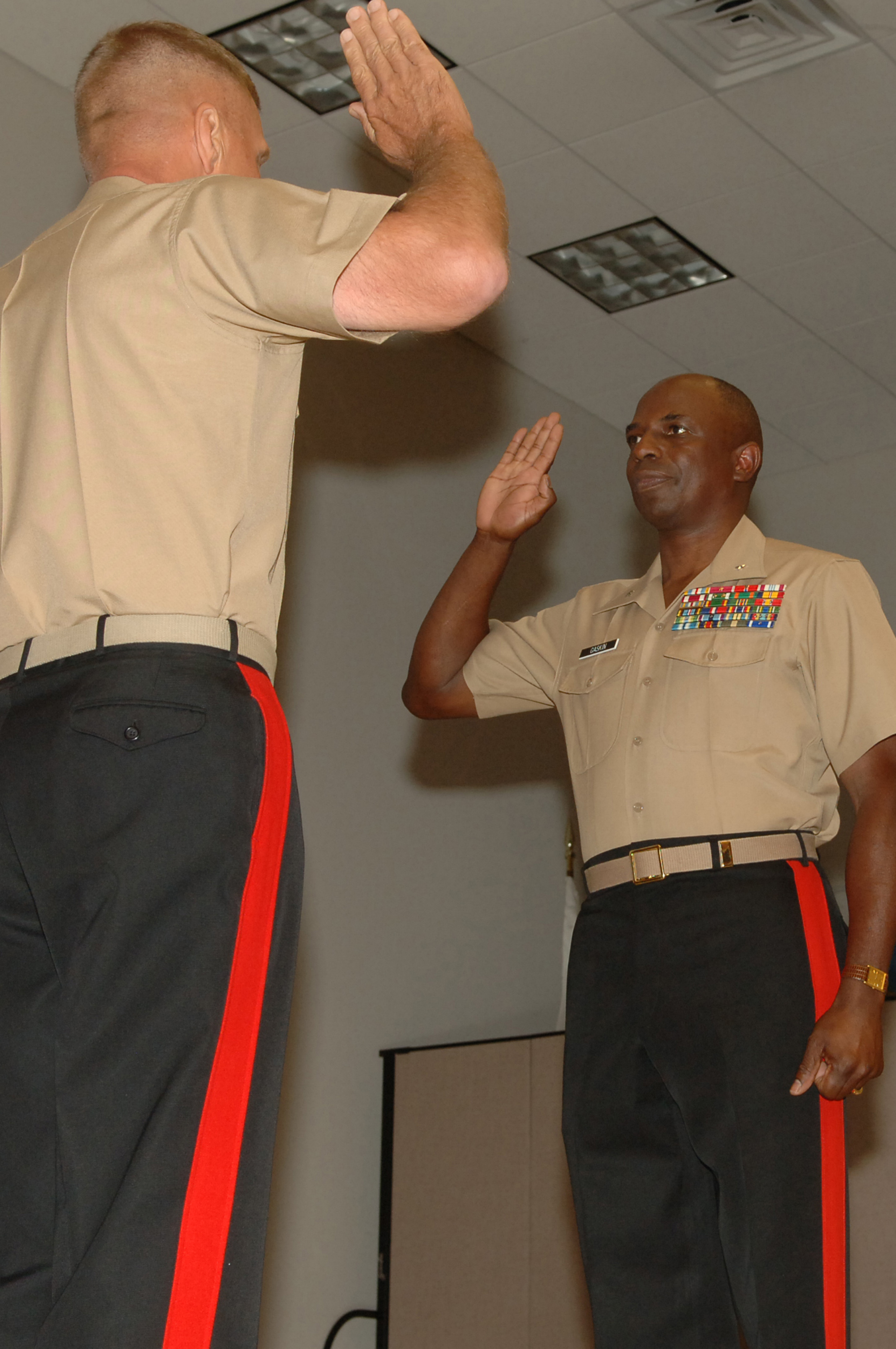
Major General Gaskin administered oath by CMC Michael Hagee, October 2005.

Gaskin served as the Commanding General of the 2nd Marine Division at Camp Lejeune, North Carolina, from June 2006 until July 2008. In addition to this role, he simultaneously served as the Commanding General of II Marine Expeditionary Force (Forward). During this tour, Gaskin led II MEF (FWD) during its year-long deployment to Al Anbar Province, Iraq as the Commanding General of Multinational Forces-West.

Previous assignments as a General Officer include service as the Vice Director of The Joint Staff, Washington, D.C. from July 2008 until May 2009 and as the Commanding General of Marine Corps Recruiting Command in Quantico, Virginia, beginning in September 2002. Additionally, he served as the Chief of Staff, Naval Striking and Support Forces-Southern Europe and as the Deputy Commanding General, Fleet Marine Forces-Europe in Naples, Italy from 2002 to 2004. Gaskin's first assignment as a General Officer was the Commanding General, Training and Education Command in Quantico in March 2000.

In addition to his time as Commanding General, Gaskin served four times with the 2d Marine Division (3rd Battalion, 2nd Marine Regiment; 1st Battalion, 2nd Marines; 6th Marine Regiment; and 2nd Battalion, 2nd Marines). During his assignment to 2nd Battalion, 2nd Marines, Gaskin was the Commanding Officer and also served as the Commanding Officer of Battalion Landing Team 2/2 when the battalion was assigned to the 22nd Marine Expeditionary Unit (Special Operations Capable), II MEF for deployment as Landing Force-6th Fleet (LF6F) during Operations Assured Response and Quick Response in defense of American Embassies in Liberia and The Central African Republic.

Gaskin's other previous assignments with II MEF include service as the G-3 Current Operations Action Officer and Operations Officer for II MEF (FWD) supporting Exercise Battle Griffin in Norway; Head of Expeditionary Operations for II MEF G-3; and as Commanding Officer of 22nd MEU (SOC) during deployment as LF6F, participating in Exercises Bright Star 99/00 in Egypt and Infinite Moonlight in Jordan and acting as the Strategic Reserve for operations in Bosnia and Kosovo.

In addition to his service at Camp Lejeune, Gaskin has also served with 3rd Force Service Support Group (Echo and Foxtrot Logistics Support Units); 3rd Marine Division (Division Command Center) in Okinawa, Japan; and with Combined Forces Command C/J-3, Seoul, South Korea as the Head of Ground Forces Branch. Gaskin's supporting establishment service includes assignment as Series Commander and Company Commanding at Marine Corps Recruit Depot, Parris Island, South Carolina; Marine Officer Instructor, Savannah State University NROTC Unit; Assistant Officer Selection Officer, Recruiting Station Macon, Georgia; Action Officer in charge of Unit Environmental Training Programs for Marine Corps Combat Development Center; and Ground Colonels' Monitor at Headquarters Marine Corps. Gaskin retired from the United States Marine Corps on 31 October 2013.

== Awards and decorations ==
Lieutenant General Gaskin's personal decorations include:

== Post-military career ==
After retiring from the Marine Corps, Gaskin worked as the Managing Director in Charge of Operation Management Complex of Global Bank in Irvine, California, and then as Chief Executive Officer of La Porte Technology Defense (LAPORTECH).

In January 2021, North Carolina Governor Roy Cooper named Gaskin the next Secretary of the North Carolina Department of Military and Veterans Affairs. On March 28, 2024, Gaskin announced that he would be stepping down in his role as head of the North Carolina Department of Military and Veterans Affairs following harsh criticism from Republican lawmakers over his decision to close the Fayetteville, North Carolina, retirement home for veterans.

Gaskin serves on the Board of Directors of the Institute for Defense and Business, a non-profit education institute.

== Zinnerman stolen valor ==
In July 2023, Gaskin faced scrutiny in the stolen valor case of Billy Zinnerman, a disgraced former Marine Corps PFC (E-2) who received an Other Than Honorable Discharge from the Marine Corps. Zinnerman had been posing as a decorated SgtMaj (E-9). Gaskin wrote a letter of recommendation for Zinnerman, in which he stated that "I've had the opportunity to witness first-hand his superior performance, bravery, and dedication to duty while in combat in Desert Storm/Desert Shield in Iraq and the Liberation of Kuwait." Gaskin had met a Sgt Major on a visit to Kuwait. Years later, Zimmerman met Gaskin and "reminded" him of their meeting. Gaskin assumed that Zimmerman was the Sgt Major he had met in Kuwait. (Zinnerman never served in Iraq during Desert Storm/Desert Shield.) Subsequently, Gaskin's letter of recommendation was based on information given him by Zinnerman.

== Politics ==
In 2016, Gaskin endorsed Hillary Clinton for president.

In 2020, Gaskin endorsed Joe Biden for president.

In the 2024 United States presidential election, Gaskin endorsed Kamala Harris for president.

Military offices
Preceded by Stephen M. Goldfein	Vice Director of the Joint Staff; 2008–2009	Succeeded by Bruce A. Grooms
