= Chair of the NATO Military Committee =

Head of the NATO Military Committee

- Coat of arms

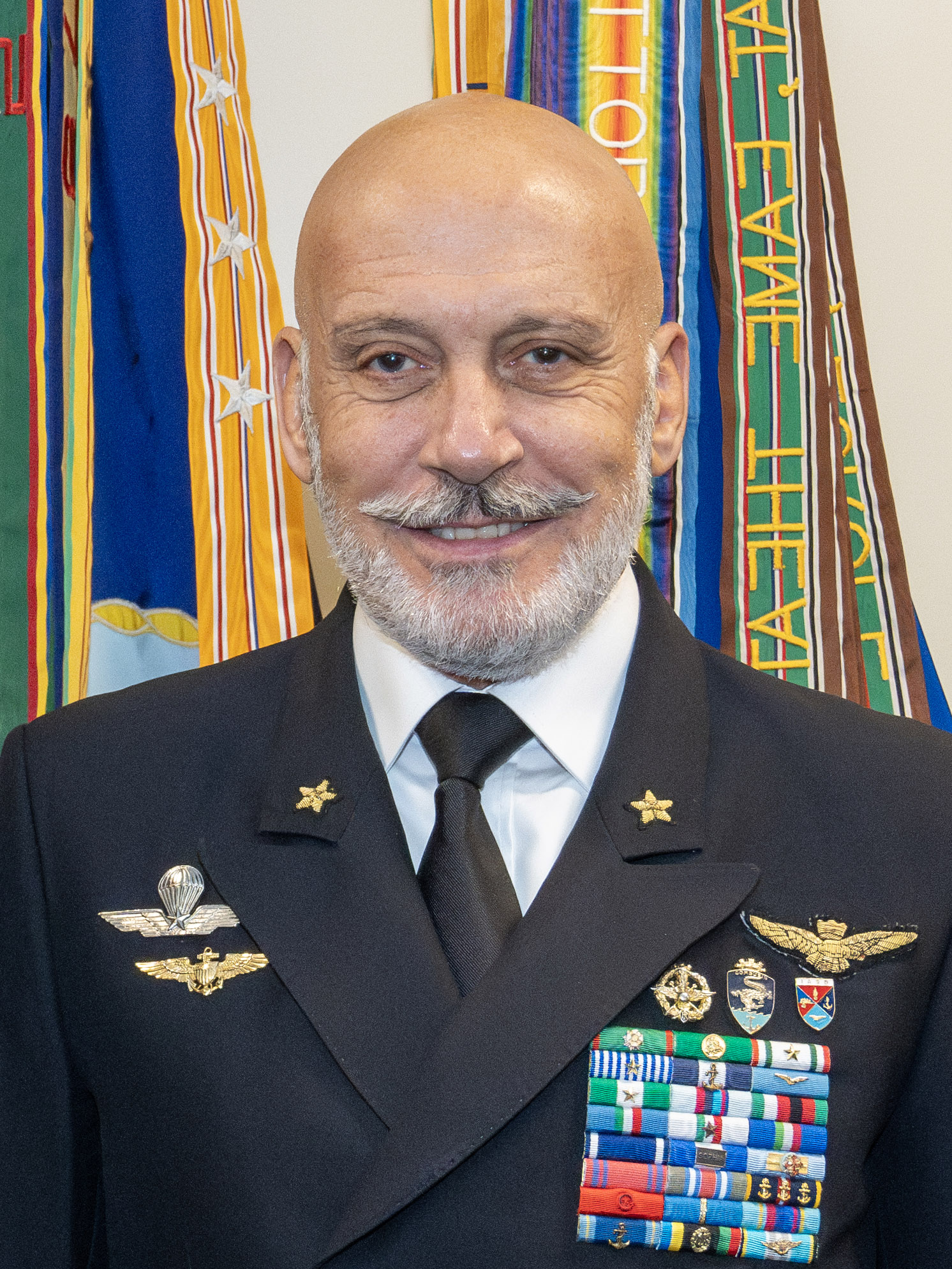
- Incumbent; Admiral Giuseppe Cavo Dragone since 17 January 2025
- NAC
- Abbreviation: CMC
- Member of: NATO
- Reports to: Secretary General of NATO
- Seat: NATO Military Committee
- Term length: 3 years
- Formation: 1949; 77 years ago
- First holder: General Omar Bradley
- Deputy: Deputy Chair of the NATO Military Committee
- Website: NATO

The Chair of the NATO Military Committee (abbr. CMC) is the head of the NATO Military Committee, which advises the North Atlantic Council (NAC) on military policy and strategy. The CMC is the senior military spokesperson of the 32-nation alliance and principal advisor to the secretary general. The chair is one of the foremost officials of NATO, next to the secretary general and the Supreme Allied Commander Europe. The CMC is assisted by the deputy chair, who advises the Deputy Secretary General and serves as the principal agent for coordination of nuclear, biological, and chemical matters for the Military Committee. Originally titled the Chairman, the post was redesignated in 2021 to reflect the gender-neutrality of the post.

The current Chair of the NATO Military Committee is Admiral Giuseppe Cavo Dragone, former Chief of the Defence Staff of Italy, who took office on 17 January 2025.

== Origins ==
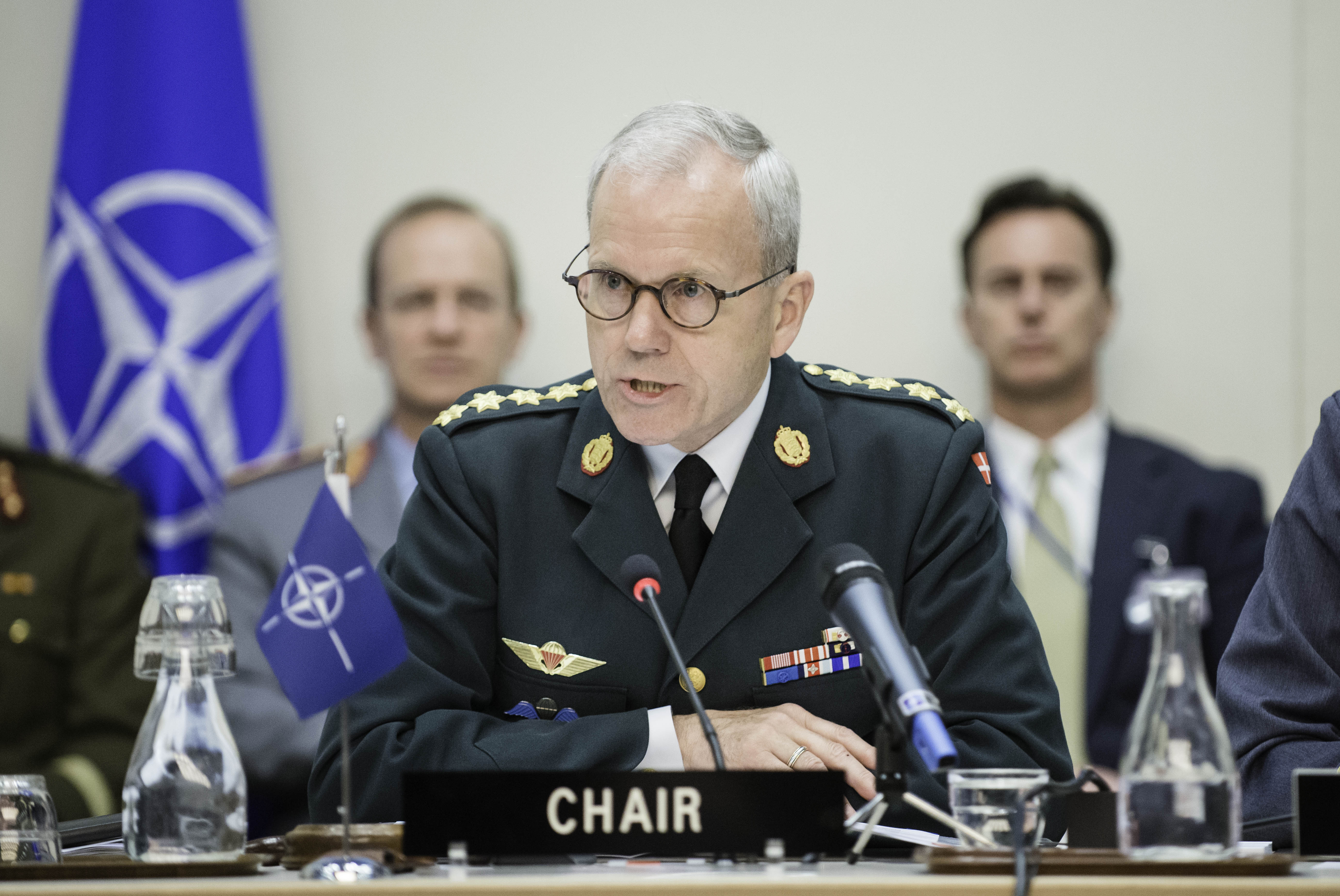
General Knud Bartels in 2014

In accordance with Article 9 of the North Atlantic Treaty and the guidance given by the Working Group on the North Atlantic Treaty Organization during the first Council session in Washington in 1949, the Defence Committee rapidly established the Military Committee. During its few sessions held behind closed doors in Washington, the Military Committee gave policy guidance on military matters to the Standing Group, and advice on military questions to the Defence Committee and other bodies, and it recommended military measures for the unified defence of the North Atlantic region to the Defence Committee. The Military Committee was directly subordinate to the Defence Committee, and each member nation was represented by its chief of staff or a deputy. Iceland, which had no military forces, was represented by a civilian. Each member state in turn held the Chair of the Military Committee for one year (C1 D-1/2, DC 1/2).

Two other groups which also sat in Washington came directly under the Military Committee:

- the Standing Group, the executive body, set up at the beginning, responsible for Military Committee everyday business;
- the Military Representatives Committee (MRC), created at the end of 1950, to ensure communication of information and points of view between the Standing Group and Alliance member states not represented on it.

== Appointment ==
The Chair of the Military Committee is elected from among the NATO Chiefs of Defence and appointed for a three-year term of office. They must have served as chief of defence – or an equivalent capacity – in their own country and is traditionally a non-US officer of four-star rank or national equivalent.

The Chair of the Military Committee chairs all meetings and acts in an international capacity. In their absence, the Deputy Chair of the Military Committee takes the chair.

== List ==
Since the formation of NATO, its Military Chairmen have been:

=== NATO Military Committee in Chiefs-of-Staff Session (1949–1963) ===
No.	Picture	Chairman of the NATO Military Committee	Took office	Left office	Time in office	Defence branch	Nationality
1	Omar Bradley	General of the Army; Omar Bradley (1893–1981)	5 October 1949	2 April 1951	1 year, 179 days	United States Army	United States
2	Etienne Baele	Lieutenant General; Etienne Baele (1891–1975)	2 April 1951	1952	0–1 years	Belgian Land Component	Belgium
3	Charles Foulkes	General; Charles Foulkes (1903–1969)	1952	1953	0–1 years	Canadian Army	Canada
4	Erhard J.C. Qvistgaard	Admiral; Erhard J.C. Qvistgaard (1898–1980)	1953	1954	0–1 years	Royal Danish Navy	Denmark
5	Augustin Guillaume	Army General; Augustin Guillaume (1895–1983)	1954	1955	0–1 years	French Army	France
6	Stylianos Pallis	General; Stylianos Pallis	1955	1956	0–1 years	Hellenic Army	Greece
7	Giuseppe Mancinelli	General; Giuseppe Mancinelli (1895–1976)	1956	1 January 1957	0–1 years	Italian Army	Italy
8	Ben Hasselman	General; Ben Hasselman (1898–1984)	1 January 1957	1 February 1958	1 year, 31 days	Royal Netherlands Army	Netherlands
9	Bjarne Øen	Lieutenant General; Bjarne Øen (1898–1994)	1 February 1958	1959	0–1 years	Royal Norwegian Air Force	Norway
10	J. A. Beleza Ferraz	General; J. A. Beleza Ferraz (1901–?)	1959	1960	0–1 years	Portuguese Army	Portugal
11	Rüştü Erdelhun	General; Rüştü Erdelhun (1894–1983)	23 February 1960	3 June 1960	101 days	Turkish Land Forces	Turkey
12	Louis Mountbatten, 1st Earl Mountbatten of Burma	Admiral of the Fleet; Louis Mountbatten, 1st Earl Mountbatten of Burma (1900–1979)	3 June 1960	June 1961	1 year	Royal Navy	United Kingdom
13	Lyman Lemnitzer	General; Lyman Lemnitzer (1899–1988)	June 1961	1962	0–1 years	United States Army	United States
14	Charles Paul de Cumont	Lieutenant General; Charles Paul de Cumont (1902–1990)	1962	December 1963	0–1 years	Belgian Land Component	Belgium

=== NATO Military Committee in Permanent Session (1958–1963) ===
No.	Picture	Chairman of the NATO Military Committee	Took office	Left office	Time in office	Defence branch	Nationality
1	Ben Hasselman	General; Ben Hasselman (1898–1984)	1 February 1958	April 1961	3 years, 2 months	Royal Netherlands Army	Netherlands
2	Adolf Heusinger	General; Adolf Heusinger (1897–1982)	April 1961	December 1963	2 years, 8 months	West German Army	West Germany

=== NATO Military Committee (1963–present) ===
No.	Picture	Chairman of the NATO Military Committee	Took office	Left office	Time in office	Defence branch	Nationality
1	Adolf Heusinger	General; Adolf Heusinger (1897–1982)	1 December 1963	1 April 1964	4 months	West German Army	West Germany
2	Charles Paul de Cumont	Lieutenant General; Charles Paul de Cumont (1902–1990)	1 April 1964	1 June 1968	4 years, 61 days	Belgian Land Component	Belgium
3	Sir Nigel Henderson	Admiral; Sir Nigel Henderson (1909–1993)	1 June 1968	1 April 1971	2 years, 304 days	Royal Navy	United Kingdom
4	Johannes Steinhoff	General; Johannes Steinhoff (1913–1994)	1 April 1971	28 June 1974	3 years, 88 days	West German Air Force	West Germany
5	Sir Peter Hill-Norton	Admiral of the Fleet; Sir Peter Hill-Norton (1915–2004)	28 June 1974	20 March 1977	2 years, 265 days	Royal Navy	United Kingdom
6	Herman Fredrik Zeiner-Gundersen	General; Herman Fredrik Zeiner-Gundersen (1915–2002)	20 March 1977	1 January 1980	2–3 years	Norwegian Army	Norway
7	Robert Hilborn Falls	Admiral; Robert Hilborn Falls (1924–2009)	1 January 1980	1 November 1983	2–3 years	Canadian Maritime Command	Canada
8	Cor de Jager	General; Cor de Jager (1925–2001)	1 November 1983	30 September 1986	2 years, 333 days	Royal Netherlands Army	Netherlands
9	Wolfgang Altenburg	General; Wolfgang Altenburg (1928–2023)	30 September 1986	5 September 1989	2 years, 340 days	West German Army	West Germany
10	Vigleik Eide	General; Vigleik Eide (1933–2011)	5 September 1989	31 December 1992	3 years, 117 days	Norwegian Army	Norway
11	Sir Richard Vincent	Field Marshal; Sir Richard Vincent (1931–2018)	1 January 1993	14 February 1996	3 years, 45 days	British Army	United Kingdom
12	Klaus Naumann	General; Klaus Naumann (born 1939)	14 February 1996	6 May 1999	3 years, 81 days	German Army	Germany
13	Guido Venturoni	Admiral; Guido Venturoni (1934–2025)	6 May 1999	30 June 2002	3 years, 55 days	Italian Navy	Italy
14	Harald Kujat	General; Harald Kujat (born 1942)	1 July 2002	17 June 2005	2 years, 351 days	German Air Force	Germany
15	Raymond Henault	General; Raymond Henault (born 1949)	17 June 2005	27 June 2008	3 years, 10 days	Canadian Air Command	Canada
16	Giampaolo Di Paola	Admiral; Giampaolo Di Paola (born 1944)	27 June 2008	18 November 2011	3 years, 144 days	Italian Navy	Italy
–	Walter E. Gaskin	Lieutenant General; Walter E. Gaskin (born 1951); Acting	18 November 2011	2 January 2012	45 days	United States Marine Corps	United States
17	Knud Bartels	General; Knud Bartels (born 1952)	2 January 2012	26 June 2015	3 years, 175 days	Royal Danish Army	Denmark
18	Petr Pavel	General; Petr Pavel (born 1961)	26 June 2015	29 June 2018	3 years, 3 days	Czech Land Forces	Czech Republic
19	Sir Stuart Peach	Air Chief Marshal; Sir Stuart Peach (born 1956)	29 June 2018	25 June 2021	2 years, 361 days	Royal Air Force	United Kingdom
20	Rob Bauer	Admiral; Rob Bauer (born 1962)	25 June 2021	17 January 2025	3 years, 206 days	Royal Netherlands Navy	Netherlands
21	Giuseppe Cavo Dragone	Admiral; Giuseppe Cavo Dragone (born 1957)	17 January 2025	Incumbent	1 year, 245 days	Italian Navy	Italy

== See also ==
- Chairman of the European Union Military Committee
- International Military Staff
- NATO Military Committee
- Supreme Allied Commander Europe
