= Jæger – i krig med eliten =

2009 book by Thomas Rathsack

- English language version of Jæger – i krig med eliten titled Jaeger: At War with Denmark's Elite Special Forces
- Author: Thomas Rathsack
- Language: Danish
- Genre: Biography
- Publisher: People’s Press
- Publication date: 21 September 2009
- Publication place: Denmark
- English publication date: 14 March 2015
- Media type: Paperback
- Pages: 285
- ISBN: 978-87-7055-559-3
- Website: thomasrathsack.dk

Jæger – i krig med eliten (Jaeger: At War with Denmark's Elite Special Forces) is a book by former Jægerkorpset member Thomas Rathsack. It details operations by Danish special forces fighting in Iraq and Afghanistan. The Danish Department of Defense tried to suppress its publication, fearing leaking of classified information, but the Danish newspaper Politiken published it as a supplement to its September 15 issue.

An Arabic translation later appeared online, confirming the Danish Department of Defense's fears of vital information landing in the hands of the enemy, it was however discovered that the book was translated by someone within Department of Defense, causing Tim Sloth Jørgensen to step down as Chief of Defence.
