= Tim Sloth Jørgensen =

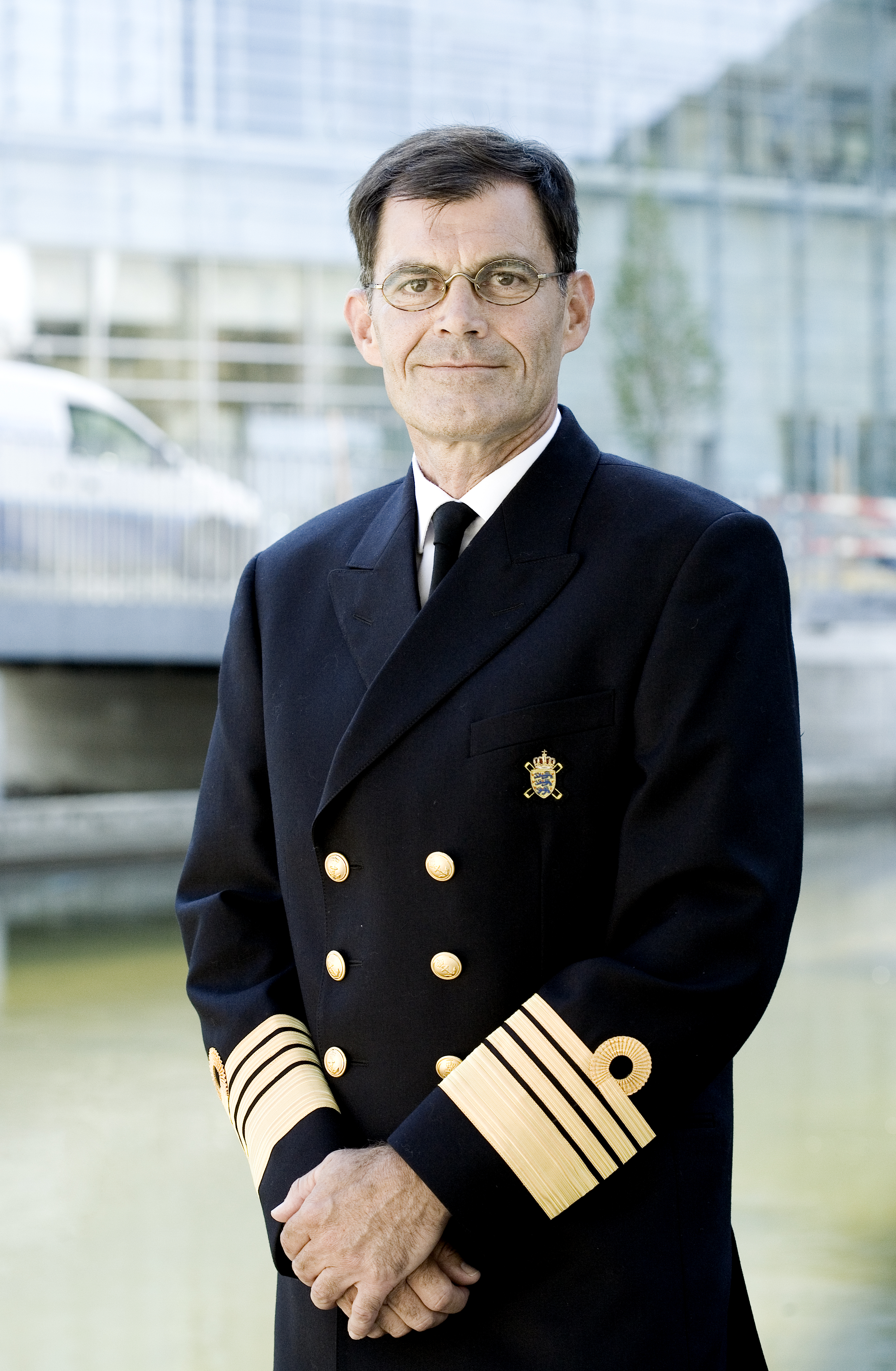
- Born: 21 October 1951 (age 74); Randers, Denmark
- Military career
- Branch: Royal Danish Navy
- Rank: Admiral
- Other work: Advisor to Terma A/S

Chief of Defence of Denmark
- In office 1 August 2008 – 4 October 2009
- Preceded by: Hans Jesper Helsø
- Succeeded by: Bjørn Bisserup

Tim Sloth Jørgensen (born 21 October 1951) is a senior officer in the Royal Danish Navy and former Chief of Defence of the Danish Armed Forces.

Jørgensen resigned as chief of staff on 4 October 2009 due to his involvement in a controversial fake Arabic translation of Jæger – i krig med eliten, a book by a former special forces member the Danish Army Command tried to suppress.

In 2012, he became an advisor to Terma A/S, a Danish defense and aerospace manufacturer.

== Awards and decorations ==
- Commander 1st Class of the Order of the Dannebrog
- Queen Ingrid Commemorative Medal
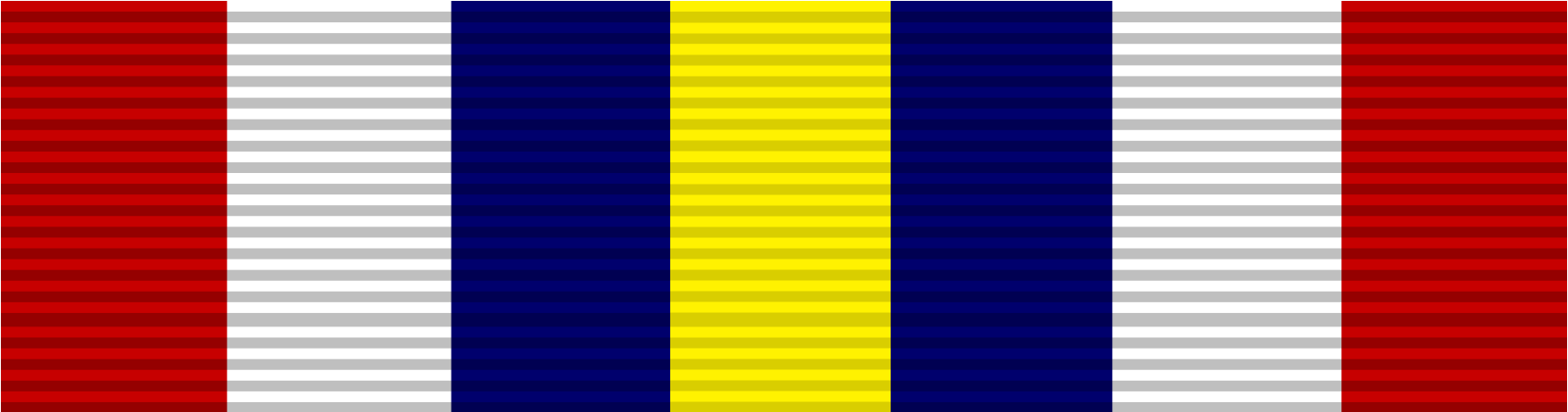
- The Nordic Blue Berets Medal of Honour
- Navy Long Service Medal
- NATO medal for the former Yugoslavia
