= Thomas Rathsack =

Danish special forces soldier and author

- Born: 1967 (age 58–59)
- Military career
- Branch: Royal Danish Army
- Service years: 1985–1994; 2001–2008
- Rank: Sergeant first class
- Unit: Jaeger Corps
- Awards: U.S. Presidential Unit Citation
- Other work: Jæger – i krig med eliten
- Website: Official website

Thomas Rathsack is a lecturer and former member of the Danish Jaeger Corps.

He served with the Royal Life Guards as a sergeant before getting accepted into the Jaeger Corps in 1990. After retiring from the army he worked as a photographer and IT specialist. He reenlisted after the September 11 attacks.

He writes about his experiences in Iraq and Afghanistan in his book Jæger – i krig med eliten (Jaeger: At War with Denmark's Elite Special Forces), which was widely talked about and criticized.

In 2017, he featured in a TV2-produced show which put 30 men through Jaegor Corps-like physical tests.
