= Stylianos Pallis =

Lt. General Stylianos Pallis was a Greek military officer and chairman of the NATO Military Committee from 1955 to 1956.

Pallis was presented with the United States Legion of Merit, in the degree of officer for "exceptionally meritorious conduct in the performance of outstanding services to the Government of the United States, from August 1953 to January 1956".
