= Giampaolo Di Paola =

Italian politician (born 1944)

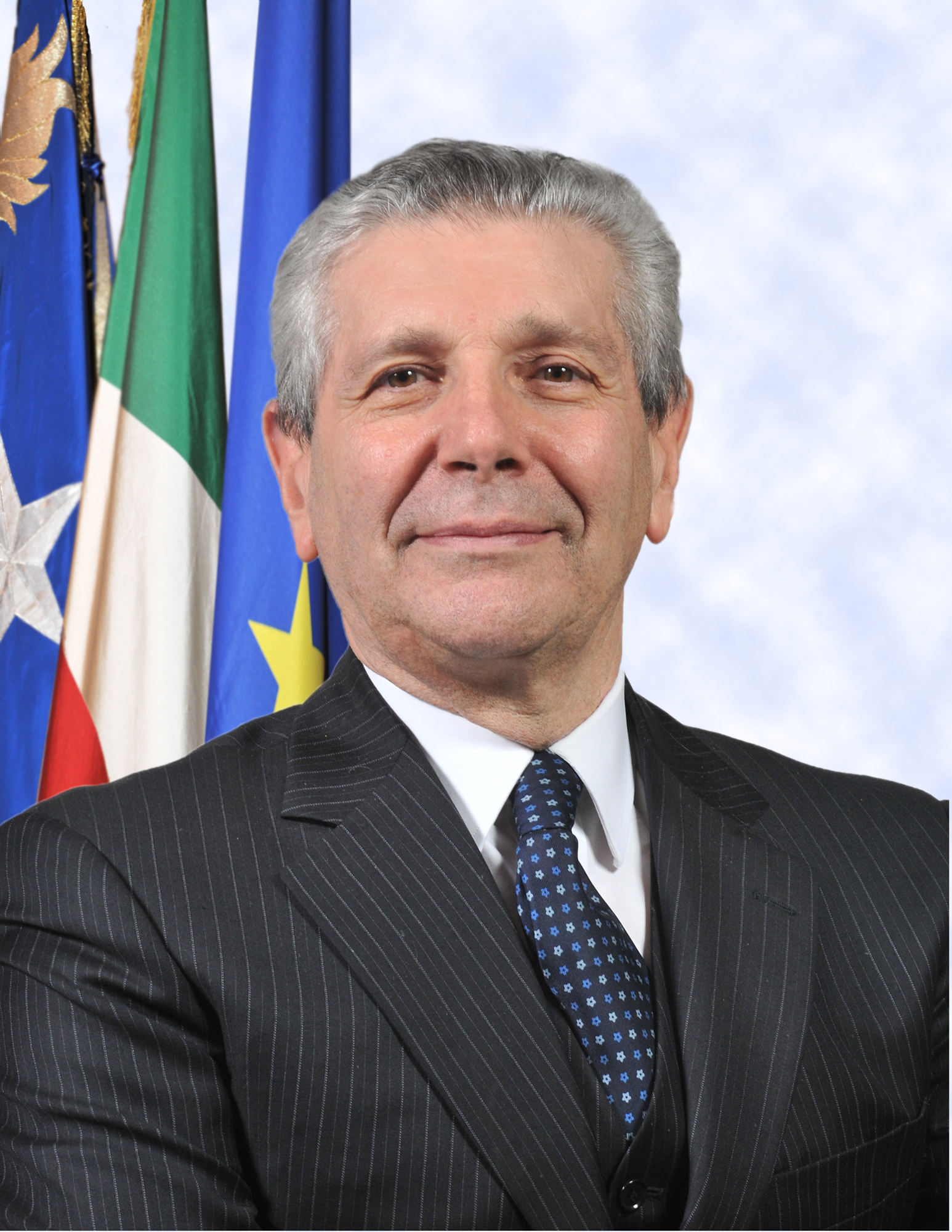
- Official portrait, 2011

Minister of Defence
- In office 16 November 2011 – 28 April 2013
- Prime Minister: Mario Monti
- Preceded by: Ignazio La Russa
- Succeeded by: Mario Mauro

Chairman of the NATO Military Committee
- In office 27 June 2008 – 18 November 2011
- Preceded by: Raymond Henault
- Succeeded by: Walter E. Gaskin (acting)

Personal details
- Born: 15 August 1944 (age 82) Torre Annunziata, Italy
- Party: Independent
- Education: Nato Defence College

Military service
- Rank: Admiral

Giampaolo Di Paola (born 15 August 1944) is an Italian naval officer who served in the government of Italy as minister of defense from November 2011 to April 2013. He was the Italian military's Chief of Staff from 10 March 2004 to 8 February 2008 and served as Chairman of the NATO Military Committee from 2008 to 2011.

== Early life and education ==
Di Paola was born in Naples on 15 August 1944. He holds a degree in strategic and military sciences and an "ad honorem" master's degree in sciences. He joined the Italian Navy in 1963 and graduated from the Naval Academy in 1966 as an ensign. In 1967 he attended the Submarine School and underwent fleet training aboard submarines, receiving a promotion to sub-lieutenant on 11 November.

== Career ==
=== Military career ===
Di Paola was promoted to lieutenant on 31 July 1971. He served in junior officer appointments in conventional submarines and commanded the submarine Cappellini in 1974–1975. He was promoted to corvette captain (lieutenant-commander) on 1 January 1976 and to frigate captain (commander) on 1 January 1980, receiving command of the submarine Sauro (1980–81).

In 1981 he attended the NATO Defense College in Rome. From 1981 to 1984 Di Paola served as Anti Submarine Warfare and Undersea Warfare Program Officer, Long Term Planning Branch, in the Supreme Allied Command Atlantic in Norfolk, Virginia, United States. In 1984, he assumed command of the frigate Grecale. In 1986, he was appointed to the Navy Staff in Rome as Plans and Programs Branch Chief in the Directorate of Financial Planning. From 1989 to 1990, as a Captain (promoted 31 December 1986), he commanded the aircraft carrier Garibaldi.

In 1990 Di Paola returned to the Navy Staff and was appointed as Executive Assistant to the Deputy Chief of Staff (1990–91), then as Chief of Naval Plans and Policy Branch (1991–92), and finally as Assistant Chief of Staff for Plans and Operations (1993–94). He was promoted to rear admiral (commodore/rear admiral (lower half)) on 31 December 1993. During this period the Italian Navy was involved in supporting NATO arms embargo operations (Operation Sharp Guard) to contain the conflict in the former Yugoslavia, and in the U.N. operation Restore Hope in Somalia.

As a Rear Admiral (lower half) Di Paola was assigned to the Defense Staff in 1994, at the Ministry of Defense. Here he served as chief of the Directorate of Defense Policy between 1994 and 1998. In this position he took an active part in the planning of the Italian contribution to the NATO effort for the stabilization of the Balkans and for the Italian-led Operation in support of Albania in 1997. As Polmil advisor to the Minister of Defense and to the Italian Chod he was actively engaged in NATO PfP initiative and in the Mediterranean Dialogue. He was also the Italian representative to the HLG on nuclear and proliferation issues.

From 1998 to 2001, with the rank of divisional admiral (rear admiral; promoted 31 December 1997), he assumed the position of Chief of the Cabinet Office of the Ministry of Defence. On 1 January 1999 he was promoted to squadron vice-admiral (vice admiral). In this position he took active part in supporting the political decision making for the Italian contribution to the NATO initiative in Kosovo, the NATO enlargement process and outreach policy and in the development of the ESDP and NATO-EU relationship.

In March 2001 he was appointed Secretary General of Defence/National Armaments Director. In this capacity he held national responsibility for major NATO programmes such as AGS, ALTBMD, NATO Airlift Capability, NATO SATCOM Post 2000 and MEADS. He was promoted Admiral on 10 March 2004 on becoming Chief of Defense. In this capacity he had the overall responsibility for the policy and planning of the Italian Armed Forces and – as CINCFOR – he did hold planning and command responsibility for Italian Forces participation in NATO, EU and Coalition operations conducted in Afghanistan, Iraq, the Balkans, the Mediterranean, Pakistan and in the United Nations Operation in Lebanon. From 27 June 2008 to 15 November 2011, he was the chairman of the NATO Military Committee.

=== Political career ===
On 16 November 2011, Di Paola was appointed to serve in Mario Monti's cabinet as minister of defense. His tenure ended in April 2013 and Mario Mauro replaced him in the post.

== Other activities ==
- Italy-USA Foundation, Member
- Trilateral Commission, Member of the European Group

== Awards and decorations ==
Di Paola's military decorations and awards include the Knight Grand Cross of the Order of Merit of the Republic of Italy, Meritorious Service Medal for distinguished military service, Commander of Legion of Merit (USA), Commandeur de l'Ordre de la Legion of Honour (France), Commandeur de l'Ordre National du merite (France), Grand Officer of the Order of Infante Don Enrico (Poland), Grand Officer of military virtue with war insignia (RO), UN Medal for UN Peacekeeping Mission in Kosovo.

Grand Officer of the Military Order of Italy
Knight Grand Cross of the Order of Merit of the Italian Republic
Maurician Medal, for 50 years military service
Medaglia d'oro al merito di lungo comando (20+ years)
Medal of Honour for Long-time Maritime Navigation (10 years)
Croce d'oro per anzianità di servizio (ufficiali e sottufficiali, 40 years)
Grand Cross with Swords of the Order pro merito Melitensi
Knight Commander with Star of the Order of St. Gregory the Great
Sacred Military Constantinian Order of Saint George
Commandeur of the Légion d'honneur
Chief Commander of the Legion of Merit
Commandeur of the Ordre national du Mérite
Commemorative Medal of the Sovereign Military Order of Malta for Operations in the former Yugoslavia
Grand Officer of the Order of Prince Henry
United Nations Interim Administration Mission in Kosovo (UNMIK) Medal
Distantivo d'Onore per Sommergibilisti

Military offices
Preceded by Rolando Mosca Moschini	Chief of Staff of the Armed Forces; 2004–2008	Succeeded by Vincenzo Camporini
Preceded by Ray Henault	Chairperson of the Nato Military Committee; 2008–2011	Succeeded by Knud Bartels
Political offices
Preceded by Ignazio La Russa	Italian Minister of Defence; 2011–2013	Succeeded by Mario Mauro
