= Royal Danish Defence College =

Military educational institution in Denmark

Coordinates: 55°43′3.09″N 12°34′23.33″E

- Forsvarsakademiet
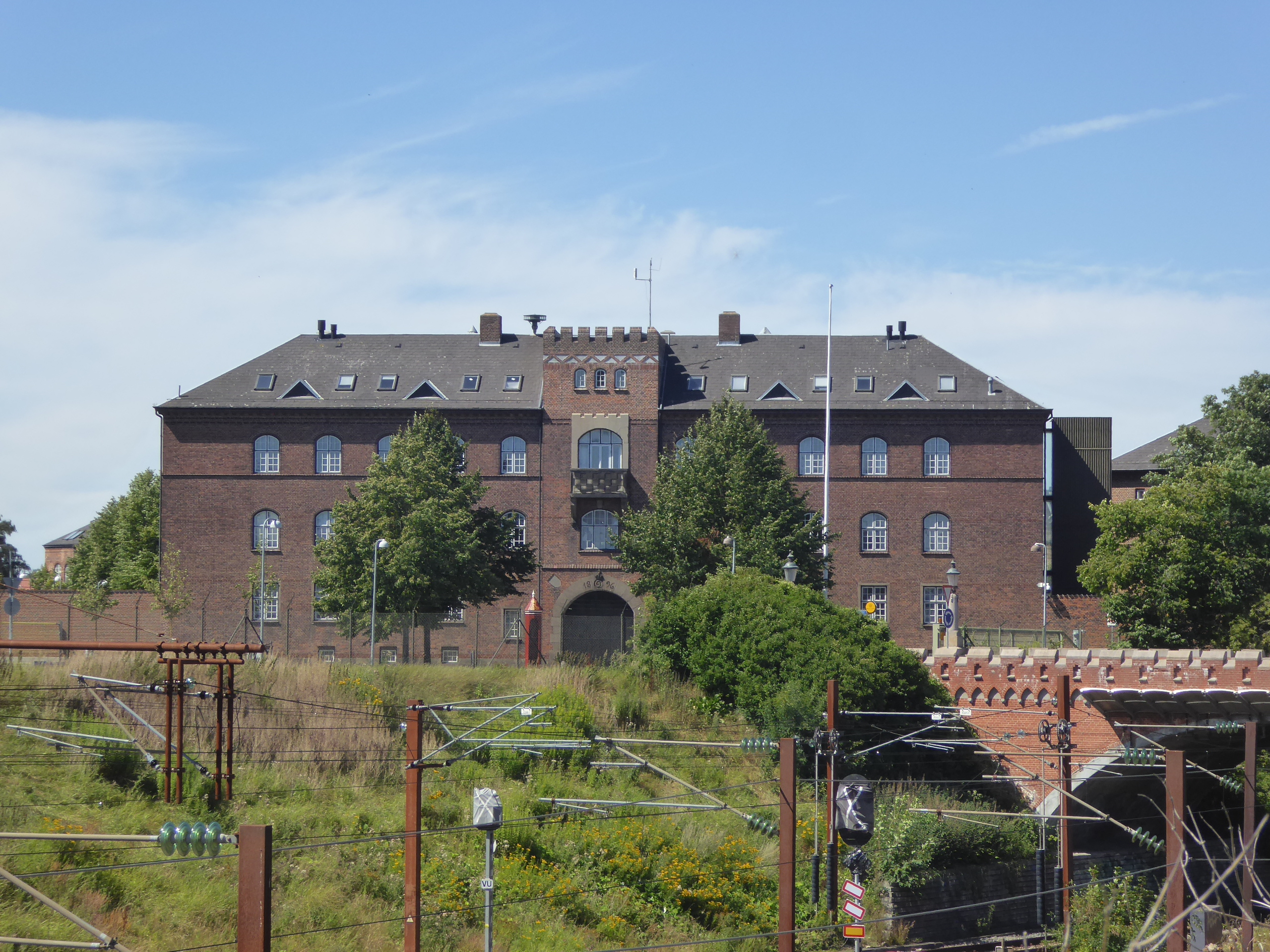
- Svanemøllens Barracks
- Former names: Den Kongelige Militaire Høiskole
- Motto: Sapientia et Providentia
- Motto in English: Wisdom and foresight
- Type: Military academy
- Established: 3 May 1830; 196 years ago by Frederik VI
- President: Major General Flemming Mathiesen
- Vice-president: Captain Christian Rune
- Dean: Ole Kværnø
- Location: Copenhagen, Denmark
- Campus: Svanemøllens Barracks
- Website: Official Website

The Royal Danish Defence College (Danish: Forsvarsakademiet; FAK) is an independent authority in the Armed Forces under the Armed Forces Commander's Defence Command, which provides training, research, advice, and consultancy services in core military areas. The activities of the Defence Academy primarily target the staff of the Armed Forces, but much of the research is done in collaboration with other research institutions. The head of the Defence Academy typically has the rank of Major General or Rear Admiral.

== History ==
The institution was established on May 3, 1830, when Frederick VI of Denmark created the Royal Military College, which was to conduct the training of officers. Since 1830, the school has enlisted both army and naval officers, just as the Defence Academy has since 1951 trained the officers of the Air Force. In addition, students from the Home Guard, the Armed Forces Health Service and civilians from the Armed Forces are admitted.

Since 1992, the Defence Academy has been housed at Svanemøllens Barracks in Østerbro. Before that, the Defence Academy was located at Østerbrogades Barracks. The Defence Academy, as it appears today, was established on January 1, 2001, as part of the 1999 Defence Agreement. This led to the merging of a number of institutions. In 2014, the three defence officers' schools were also subordinated, so that all officer training in Denmark was then handled by the Defence Academy.

== Location ==
The Defence Academy consists of a staff, three defence officer schools, the Defence Language School, the three defence sergeant schools, six institutes and several independent and subordinate centers:

- Army Officers' School
- Naval Officer's School
- Air Force Officer's School
- Defence Language School
- Department of Military Operations (IMO)
- Department of Strategy (IFS)
- Department of Management and Organization (ILO)
- Department of Military Technology (IMT)
- Department of Military History and War Theory (IMK)
- Center for Distance Learning (CFU)
- Center for Digital Management (CDF)
- Defence Knowledge Center

As of 2020, the institution had over 100 instructors, nearly three quarters of whom were members of the military, the rest being civilians.

=== Knowledge Center ===
The Armed Forces previously had four libraries, which at the end of 2009 were integrated into the newly established Armed Forces Library with its headquarters at Kastellet in Copenhagen. For the sake of space, however, part of the four book collections were placed in a magazine. In 2018, the Defence Library was renamed the Defence Knowledge Center based at Svanemøllens Barracks under the Defence Academy.

The four libraries were:

- Defence Academy Library
- The Royal Garrison Library (Army)
- The Air Force Library
- Naval Library

== Presidents ==
- 1951–1952: Colonel C.V. Hjalf
- 1952–1957: Colonel Villi Lund Hvalkof
- 1957–1961: Colonel J. Heidicke
- 1961–1966: Colonel M.N.M.P. Amtrup
- 1966–1979: Colonel Mogens Rosenløv
- 1979–1984: Colonel J. Gerstoft
- 1984–1986: Colonel P.B. Nielsen
- 1986–1989: Colonel P.K. Borrits
- 1989–1992: Colonel J.E. Zilmer
- 1992–1998: Colonel N.L. Fredenslund
- 1999–2001: Colonel N.O. Jensen
- 2001–2007: Major General Karsten Møller
- 2007–2010: Major General Carsten Svensson
- 2010–2018: Rear Admiral Nils Christian Wang
- 2018–2023: Rear Admiral Henrik Ryberg
- 2023-Present: Major General Flemming Mathiesen
