= Chief of Defence (Denmark) =

Highest-ranking professional military officer in the Danish Armed Forces

Chief of the Danish Defence
- Forsvarschefen
- Coat of arms for the Chief of Defence

- Standard of the Chief of Defence

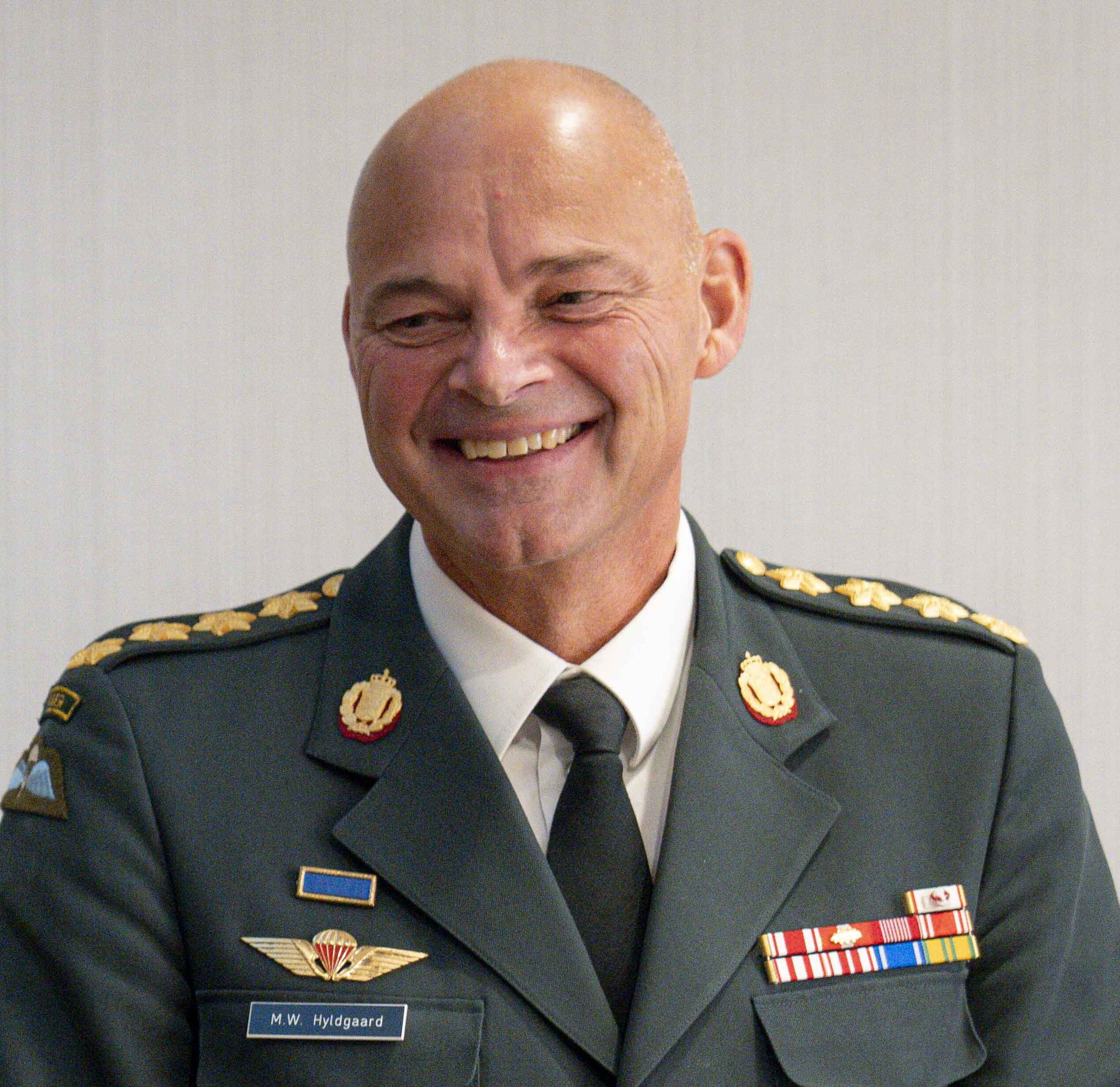
- Incumbent; General Michael Hyldgaard since 1 June 2025
- Ministry of Defence
- Abbreviation: FC
- Member of: Defence Command of Denmark
- Reports to: Minister of Defence
- Appointer: Minister of Defence
- Term length: Five years (renewable)
- Constituting instrument: LBK Nr. 582 of 24/05/2017 §11–12
- Formation: 27 May 1950
- First holder: Admiral Erhard J.C. Qvistgaard
- Deputy: Chief of the Defence Staff
- Website: forsvaret.dk/high-command

The Chief of Defence of Denmark (Danish: Forsvarschefen), acting under the statutory responsibility of the Minister of Defence, is the chief of defence and commander of the Royal Danish Army, the Royal Danish Navy and the Royal Danish Air Force. The Chief of Defence is the principal military adviser to the Minister of Defence and the head of the Defence Command.

The Chief of Defence is the highest-ranking military officer on active duty in the Danish Armed Forces and has the rank of four-star General (or Admiral if from the Navy) (OF-9), and supervises roughly 93% of all military spending in Denmark.

The Danish Home Guard and Defence intelligence is directly under the Ministry of Defence, only in times of war will the Home Guard Command be transferred to the Defence Command, and thus come under the authority of the Chief of Defence.

The job was traditionally rotated evenly between the army, navy and air force. This tradition was abandoned in 2012. There is no fixed length of time associated with the position, the contract however currently has to be renewed every 5 years.

== Rank flags ==
Rank	General	Admiral
Flag		

== List of officeholders ==
No.	Portrait	Name (born–died)	Term of office			Defence branch	Ref.
No.	Portrait	Name (born–died)	Took office	Left office	Time in office	Defence branch	Ref.
1		Admiral; Erhard J.C. Qvistgaard (1898–1980)	1 October 1950	30 September 1962	11 years, 364 days	Navy	
2		General; Kurt Ramberg (1908–1997)	1 October 1962	30 November 1972	10 years, 60 days	Air force	
3		General; Otto Blixenkrone-Møller (1912–2006)	1 December 1972	30 April 1977	4 years, 150 days	Army	
4		General; Knud Jørgensen (1919–1990)	1 May 1977	30 September 1984	7 years, 152 days	Air force	
5		General; Otto K. Lind (1920–2000)	1 October 1984	30 November 1985	1 year, 60 days	Army	
6		Admiral; Sven Eigil Thiede (1924–2005)	1 December 1985	31 October 1989	3 years, 334 days	Navy	
7		General; Jørgen Lyng (born 1934)	1 November 1989	31 March 1996	6 years, 151 days	Army	
8		Admiral; Hans Jørgen Garde (1939–1996) (Note: Died in a plane crash.)	1 April 1996	3 August 1996 ‽	124 days	Navy	
–		General; Christian Hvidt (born 1942)	3 August 1996	20 August 1996	17 days	Air force	
9		General; Christian Hvidt (born 1942)	20 August 1996	30 September 2002	6 years, 41 days	Air force	
10		General; Hans Jesper Helsø (born 1948)	1 October 2002	31 July 2008	5 years, 304 days	Army	
11		Admiral; Tim Sloth Jørgensen (born 1951)	1 August 2008	4 October 2009	1 year, 64 days	Navy	
–		Lieutenant general Bjørn Bisserup (born 1960) acting	5 October 2009	15 November 2009	41 days	Army	
12		General; Knud Bartels (born 1952)	16 November 2009	2 January 2012	2 years, 47 days	Army	
–		Lieutenant general Bjørn Bisserup (born 1960) acting	2 January 2012	20 March 2012	78 days	Army	
13		General; Peter Bartram (born 1961)	20 March 2012	10 January 2017	4 years, 296 days	Army	
14		General; Bjørn Bisserup (born 1960)	10 January 2017	1 December 2020	3 years, 326 days	Army	
15		General; Flemming Lentfer (born 1964)	1 December 2020	3 April 2024	3 years, 124 days	Air force	
–		General; Michael Hyldgaard (born 1964)	3 April 2024	1 June 2025	1 year, 59 days	Army	
16		General; Michael Hyldgaard (born 1964)	1 June 2025	Incumbent	1 year, 98 days	Army	
