= Badges of the Danish Military =

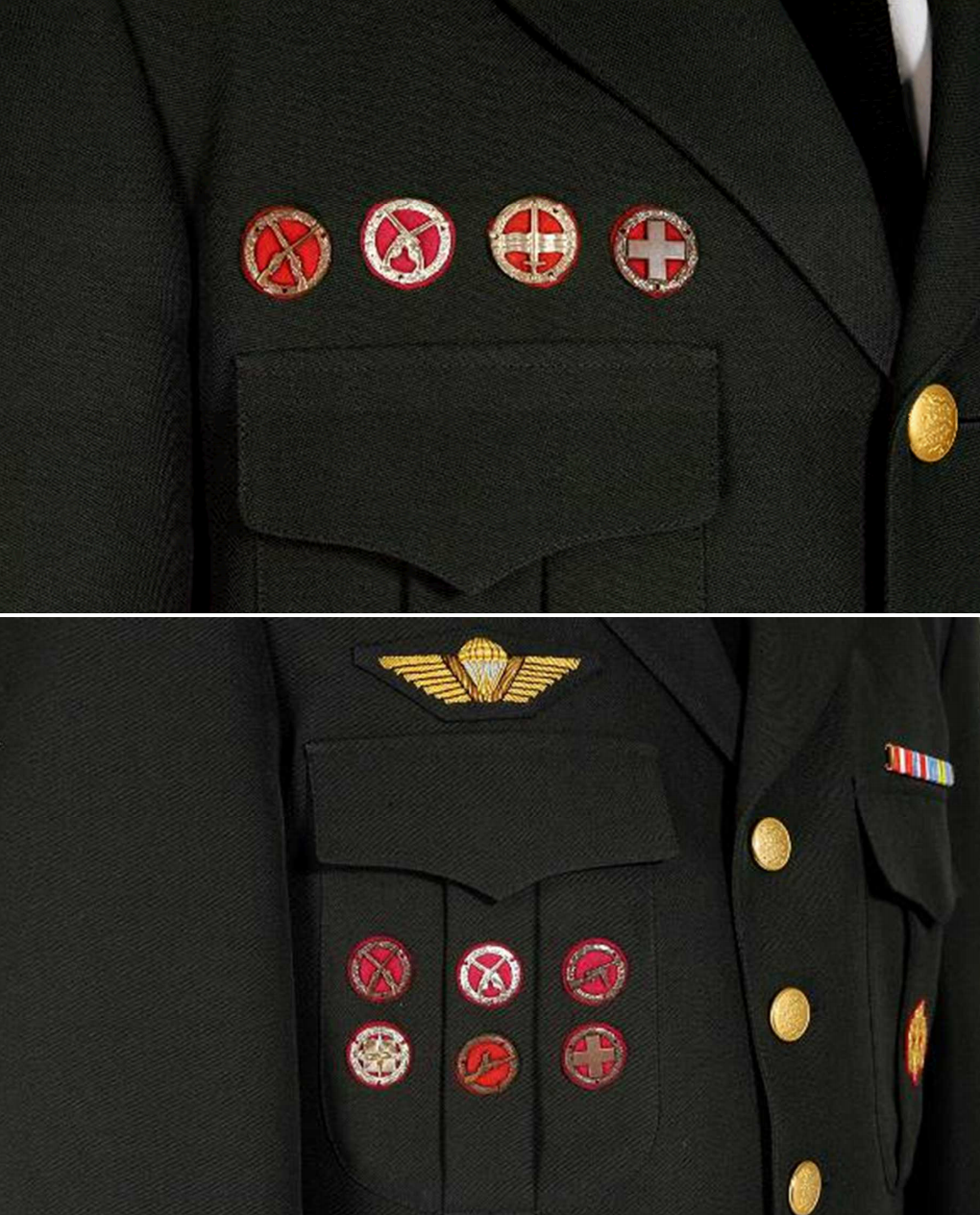
Army uniform showing different ways to wear the badges

Badges of the Danish Military are military decorations issued to soldiers who achieve a variety of qualifications and accomplishments while serving active or reserve duty in the Danish military. They are worn, on the service dress or barracks dress, either right above or on the breast pocket, depending on whether there are Danish Parachutist Brevets. There is no limit to the number worn and there is no designated order for the badges.

The badges were first created by the Danish Brigade in Exile, in order to show proficiency. It did however not see official and wide use until the 1950s, when standardized versions were introduced.

== Proficiency badges ==
The proficiency badges are small circular badges 25mm in diameter showing a laurel wreath and the icon in the center. They are sown onto the uniform with a small circular piece of felt backing:

=== Army ===
The army has different colors depending on the service branch:

- Infantry: Cardinal red (the two infantry regiments Royal Life Guards and Schleswig Foot Regiment)
- Jutland Dragoons: Crimson red
- Guard Hussars: White
- Artillery: Crimson red
- Engineer Regiment: Black
- Signal Regiment: Dark blue
- Logistic Regiment: Crimson red
- Intelligence Regiment: Grey

=== Navy ===
White

=== Air Force ===
White

=== Shooting badges ===
Military Proficiency Badge	Name (English/Danish)	Grades	Date of creation	Notes
	Pistol Badge; Pistolmærke	Bronze, Silver, Gold	1956 for bronze and silver, 1961 for gold	Features two crossed Wheellock pistols.
	Sub-machine Gun Badge; Maskinpistolmærke	Bronze, Silver, Gold	1956 for bronze and silver, 1961 for gold	Features the Maskinpistol M.44 Husquarna. Obsolete
	Rifle Badge; Geværmærke	Bronze, Silver, Gold	1956 for bronze and silver, 1961 for gold	Features two crossed Wheellock rifles.
	Light Machine Gun Badge; Maskingevær mærke	Bronze, Silver, Gold	1955 for bronze and silver, 1961 for gold	Features the Madsen machine gun.
	Marksmanship Badge; Feltskyttemærke	Bronze	18 June 1992	Features the scope from M/75.
	Marksmanship Emblem; Feltskyttemblem	Silver, gold	?	Features the Krag–Jørgensen surrounded by wreath in oak leaves.

=== Skill badges ===
Military Proficiency Badge	Name (English/Danish)	Grades	Date of creation	Notes
	First Aid Skill Badge; Sanitetsmærke	Bronze, Silver, Gold	1956 for bronze and silver, 1961 for gold	Features a Greek Cross.
	Dog Handler Skill Badge; Hundeførermærke	Bronze, Silver, Gold	1968 for bronze, silver and gold	Features the head of a German Shepherd.
	Motorcycle courier Skill Badge; Motorordonansmærke	Bronze, Silver, Gold	1956 for bronze and silver, 1961 for gold	Features a Nimbus motorcycle. Obsolete
	Patrol Rider Skill Badge; Patruljeryttermærke	Bronze	1956	Features the head of a horse. Obsolete
	Orienteering Skill Badge; Terrænsportsmærke	Bronze, Silver, Gold	1956 for bronze and silver, 1961 for gold	Features the Orienteering flag and a compass needle.
	Combat Swimming Skill Badge; Kampsvømmer mærke	Bronze, Silver, Gold	1956 for bronze and silver, 1961 for gold	Features a sword and waves.
	Signal Skill Badge; Signalmærke	Bronze, Silver, Gold	1956 for bronze and silver, 1961 for gold	Features a sword and lightning.
	Rider Emblem; Rytteremblem	Silver (with or without arrow)	2018	Features a horseshoe and two crossed swords surrounded wreath in laurel leaves.

=== Recognition badges ===
Military Proficiency Badge	Name (English/Danish)	Grades	Date of creation	Notes
	Plane Recognition Badge; Flykendnings mærke	Bronze, Silver, Gold	22 October 1975 for bronze, silver and gold	Features a plane.
	Tank Recognition Badge; Panserkendings mærke	Bronze, Silver, Gold	1975 for bronze, silver and gold	Features a Sherman tank.
	Ship Recognition Badge; Skibskendnings mærke	Bronze, Silver, Gold	22 July 1975 for bronze, silver and gold	Features a Viking longship.

== Tabs ==
Similar in design to British and American tabs, they are worn on the right shoulder, on either service dress, barracks dress or combat uniform.

Tab	Name (English/Danish)	Notes
	Ranger; Jæger	Awarded after completing Jægerkorpset basic training and one year of satisfactory service at Corps.
	Patrol (Instructor); Patrulje (Instruktør)	Awarded after completing a number of related courses, with Instructor being awarded after reaching level of Instructor.
	Military Police; MP	Awarded after completing MP basic training and 3 months of satisfactory service.
	Explosive Ordnance Disposal; EOD	Awarded after completing a number of related courses.
	Chemical, Biological, Radiological and Nuclear; CBRN	Awarded after completing a number of related courses.
	Legal Adviser; MJUR	Awarded after given permanent or designated title as Military Legal Adviser.
	Tactical Air Control Party; TACP	Awarded after completing Tactical Air Control Party basic training and one year of satisfactory service.
	Movement Controller; MOVCON	Awarded after completing Movement controller basic training and 6 months of satisfactory service. Obsolete

== Parachute badge ==
The Danish parachutist badge, can only be acquired by Danish officers, high ranking NCOs and members of the Royal Danish Air Force, they are therefore relatively rare compared to other countries parachute badges. The parachutist badge is worn above the right breast pocket on the service dress or barracks dress, with the ability to wear a foreign brevet, on the pocket flap.

Parachutist Brevet	Name (English/Danish)	Notes
	Parachutist Badge; Faldskærmsmærke	
	Freefall Parachutist Badge; Fritfaldsmærke	Only available for Jægerkorpset and special appointed soldiers, who have completed the basic parachuttraining.

== Auncienty ==
Military Proficiency Badge	Name (English/Danish)	Grades	Date of creation	Notes
	Service Emblem - Army NCO School; Tjenestemærke, Hærens Sergentskole	1	?	Features 3 sergeant chevrons with laurel leaves. -two year of service

== See also ==
- Orders, decorations, and medals of Denmark

== Bibliography ==
- "Uniform Regulations for the Army" (PDF). Army Operational Command (in Danish). DK: parawings.com. September 2012. Archived from the original (PDF) on 19 October 2016.
