= Long Service Awards (Denmark) =

The primary governmental uniformed services of Denmark have Long Service Medals that may be awarded after 25 years of service.
Besides the normal 25 year medals, the Order of Dannebrog may also be awarded to high-ranking officers after 25 years service, or sometimes as a retirement-decoration.

After 40 years of public service the Medal of Merit may be awarded.

== Armed Forces ==
Army Long Service Medal

Ribbon of the Long Service Medal for Army, Airforce, Navy and Department of Defense

The Navy Long Service Medal (Danish: Hæderstegnet for God Tjeneste ved Søetaten) was instituted in 1801 by King Christian VII and may be awarded to any member of the Navy after 25 years of good service. After 40 years of service a gold oakleaf is added to the ribbon.

The medal was instituted in order to keep the experienced personnel in the Navy, in order to be able to continue defending the trade fleet. Besides being awarded the medal, other benefits were also given; for example carpenters received the title "Royal Shipbuilders", and Master Carpenters received a rank of officer of the navy.
Until 1925 the medal was for privates, sergeants and non-commissioned officers only. On December 9, 1925, the statutes of the medal was changed, so that the recipient now is "Any man or woman".

The Army Long Service Medal (Danish: Hæderstegnet for God Tjeneste ved Hæren) was instituted in 1945 by King Christian X and may be awarded to any member of the Army after 25 years of good service. After 40 years of service a gold oakleaf is added to the ribbon.

The Air Force Long Service Medal (Danish: Hæderstegnet for God Tjeneste ved Flyvevåbnet) was instituted in 1953 by King Frederik IX and may be awarded to any member of the Air Force after 25 years of good service. After 40 years of service a gold oakleaf is added to the ribbon.

The Department of Defense Force Long Service Medal (Danish: Forsvarets Hæderstegn for God Tjeneste) was instituted in 1953 by King Frederik IX and may be awarded to any member of the Armed Forces Central Services after 25 years of good service. After 40 years of service a gold oakleaf is added to the ribbon.

Army Reserve Long Service Medal

Ribbon of the Armed Forces Reserve Long Service Medal

The Reserve Long Service Medal (Danish: Fortjensttegnet for God Tjeneste i Forsvarets Reserve) was instituted in 1978 by Queen Margrethe II and may be awarded to any member of the Armed Forces Reserves after 25 years of good service.

Home Guard 25 years Long Service Medal ribbon
Home Guard 40 years Long Service Medal ribbon
Home Guard 50 years Long Service Medal ribbon
Home Guard 60 years Long Service Medal ribbon

The Home Guard 25 Years Long Service Medal (Danish: Hjemmeværnets 25-Årstegn) was instituted in 1988 by Queen Margrethe II and may be awarded to any member of the Home Guard after 25 years of good service.
After 40 years of service a silver oakleaf may be added to the ribbon, after 50 years a gold oakleaf may be added, and after 60 years two gold oakleaves may be added.

Home Guard 50th Anniversary Long Service Medal ribbon

The Home Guard 50th Anniversary Long Service Medal (Danish: Hjemmeværnets 50-års Jubilæumsmedalje) was instituted in 1999 by Queen Margrethe II and may be awarded to any member of the Home Guard who at the Home Guard 50th anniversary had been a member of the Home Guard for 50 years (i.e. from its creation).

Home Guard 75th Anniversary Long Service Medal ribbon

The Home Guard 75th Anniversary Long Service Medal (Danish: Hjemmeværnets 50-års Jubilæumsmedalje) was instituted in 2024 by King Frederik X and may be awarded to any member of the Home Guard who at the Home Guard 75th anniversary had been a member of the Home Guard for 75 years (i.e. from its creation).

== Civil Defense ==
Civil Defense Long Service Medal ribbon

The Civil Defense Long Service Medal (Danish: Hæderstegnet for 25 års god tjeneste i Civilforsvaret) was instituted in 1963 by King Frederik IX and may be awarded to any member of the Civil Defense after 25 years of good service. It may also be awarded to foreigners who have done noteworthy deeds for the Civil Defense cause.

The medal is awarded annually in the beginning of may. The award is given in the name of the Director on the Danish Emergency Management Agency, but most often it is the local fire chief or similar who physically gives the medal to the recipient.

Originally the medal was intended for employees of the Civil Defense, but it is currently given to both volunteers and employees of the Danish Emergency Management Agency and to volunteer firefighters who are not eligible for the Fire Department Long Service Medal.

Fire Department Long Service Medal

Municipal Fire Department Long Service Medal ribbon

The Fire Department Long Service Medal (Danish: Hæderstegn for God Tjeneste i Brandvæsnet) was instituted in 1973 by Queen Margrethe II and may be awarded to any member of the municipal fire services after 25 years of good service.

The picture in the infobox is of the old medal. The medal has been redesigned and the new obverse has the logo of the municipal fire services (Helmet, axe and nozzle).

Before 1973 the medal was divided into two parts, one for Copenhagen and Frederiksberg Fire Brigades, and one for municipal fire departments. They were put together into one medal in 1973. The original medals were instituted by King Christian IX on 29 July 1903

== Police ==
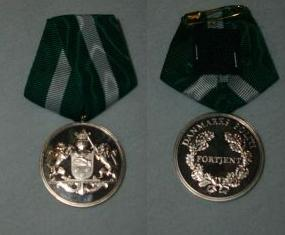
Police Long Service Medal

Police Long Service Medal ribbon

The Police Long Service Medal (Danish: Hæderstegn for 25 års God Tjeneste i Politiet) was instituted in 1959 by King Frederik IX and may be awarded to policemen, legal personnel and administrative personnel after 25 years of consecutive service in the Danish police, after their 21st birthday.

== Badges ==
Besides the medals for 25 years of service, the Civil Defense, Home Guard and Municipal Fire Departments also have Long Service Breast-badges (Danish: Anciennitetstegn) that are awarded after 10 and 20 years of service.

Civil Defense Badges are worn on the left breast pocket

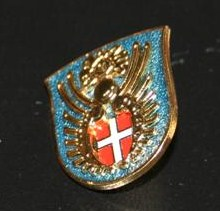
Civil Defense 10 year badge

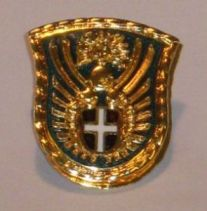
Civil Defense 20 year badge

Fire Department Badges are worn on the right breast pocket. The Fire Department badges is basically the same used for 10, 20 and 40 years, with the difference being a silver or gold back-plate being added.

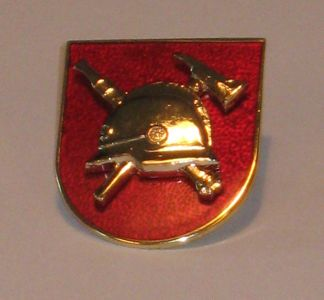
Fire Department 10 year badge

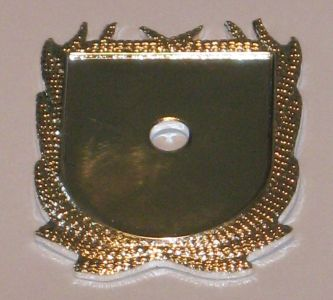
Fire Department 20 year badge

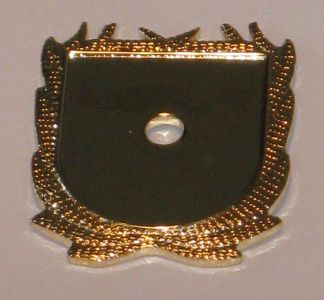
Fire Department 40 year badge

Home Guard Badges are worn on the left breast pocket

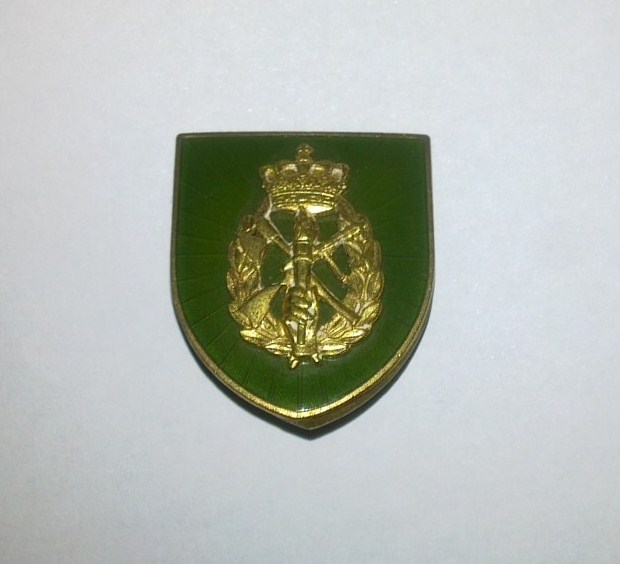
Home Guard 10 year badge

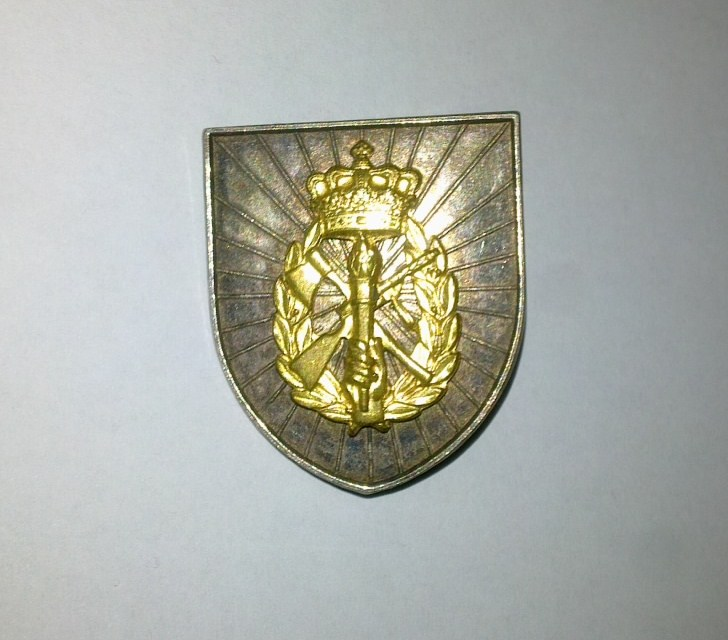
Home 20 year badge
