= List of equipment of the Royal Danish Army =

This is a list of current equipment of the Royal Danish Army.

== Weapons ==
=== Knives ===
| Model | Image | Origin (designed / made in) | Type | Notes |
|---|---|---|---|---|
| Bajonet M/95 (M7 bayonet) | | United States | Bayonet | Only used by Livgarden affixed to the M/95. Ceremonial use only uniform for when conscripts of Livgarden are on guard duty in front of palaces and so on |
| Feltkniv M/96 (Glock GmbH; Feldmesser FM 78) | | Austria | Field knife | Standard Issue Made to be affixed to the Steyr AUG despite the rifle never being in Danish service |
| Feltkniv M/26 (Eickhorn Solingen Gmbh ?) | | Germany | Bayonet | New standard issue bayonete for the M/25 riffle, with built in wire cuter |

=== Pistols ===
| Model | Image | Origin (designed / made in) | Type | Calibre | Notes |
|---|---|---|---|---|---|
| Pistol 9mm P320 (SIG Sauer; P320 X-Carry) | | United States (Group based in Germany) | Pistol | 9×19mm NATO | Standard issue pistol Modified with a flared magwell and using 21-round magazines There was a minor dispute with Glock surrounding the adoption No M/XX designation due to new naming convention of calling weapons by manufacturer's name. |
| Pistol 9mm P365 (SIG Sauer; P365) | | United States (Group based in Germany) | Pistol | 9×19mm NATO | Micro-Compact for use by Military Police and SOKOM No M/XX due to new naming convention of calling weapons by manufacturer's name. |
| Pistol M/? (Glock GmbH; G20) | | Austria | Pistol | 10×25 mm | Used by Slædepatruljen Sirius on Greenland Slædepatruljen Sirius are uniquely allowed to use Hollow-point ammunition (normally banned in war by the Hague) due to the dangerous wild life of Greenland. |

=== Rifles ===
| Model | Image | Origin (designed / made in) | Type | Calibre | Notes |
|---|---|---|---|---|---|
| Gevær M/25 (Colt CZ Group; C8 MRR) | (Note: Picture missing due to lack of copyright free picture of item.) | Canada (Group based in Czech Republic) | Assault rifle | 5.56×45mm NATO | Standard service rifle. Ordered in August 2025. 26,000 ordered, half painted brown, and half painted black, all delivered by the end of 2026. The option on the contract was exercised in February 2026, bringing the total order to around 50,000 rifles. |
| Gevær M/10 A4 (Colt Canada; C8 IUR) | | Canada (Group based in the United States) | Carbine | 5.56×45mm NATO | Standard service rifle. Rolled out in 2016 with the primary goal of cutting down on the weight of the Gevær M/10 A2. |
| Gevær M/10 A4 Kort (Colt Canada; C8 IUR) | | Canada (Group based in the United States) | Carbine | 5.56×45mm NATO | Standard service rifle of the navy built for the close quarters of a ship. Low quantities are present in the army and talks of wider issuing for vehicle crews are ongoing. |
| Gevær M/?? (MK18) | | United States | Carbine | 5.56×45mm NATO | Used by Jægerkorpset |
| Gevær M/10 A2 (Colt Canada; C8 IUR) | | Canada (Group based in the United States) | Carbine | 5.56×45mm NATO | Replaced in 2016, used now mainly by conscripts. |
| Karabin M/96 (Diemaco; C8 Carbine) | | Canada | Carbine | 5.56×45mm NATO | Replaced in 2010 by the M/10 rifle still around on some bases as reserve and used by Home Guard units. |
| Gevær M/95 (Diemaco; C7) | | Canada | Assault rifle | 5.56×45mm NATO | Replaced by the M/10 in 2010; still used by conscripts of Livgarden for ceremonial use and by Home Guard units. |
| ?? (SIG MCX) | | United States (Group based in Germany) | Carbine | 5.56×45mm NATO | The 11.5" Spear-LT variant can be seen used by Jægerkorpset |

=== Shotguns ===
| Model | Image | Origin (designed / made in) | Type | Calibre | Notes |
|---|---|---|---|---|---|
| Haglgeværer M/XX (Benelli Armi; M4 A.I. Drone Guardian) | | Italy | Semi-Automatic Shotgun | 12 gauge | To combat drones in areas where it is too dangerous to use normal rifles |

=== Bolt-action rifles ===
| Model | Image | Origin (designed / made in) | Type | Calibre | Notes |
|---|---|---|---|---|---|
| Gevær M/53-17 Repeterriffel (M1917 Enfield) | | United States | Bolt-action rifle | 7.62×63mm | Used by Slædepatruljen Sirius in Greenland. Slædepatruljen Sirius are uniquely allowed to use Hollow-point ammunition (normally banned in war by the Hague Conventions) due to the dangerous wildlife of Greenland. Donated by Canada and Norway in the 1950s |

=== Machine guns ===
| Model | Image | Origin (designed / made in) | Type | Calibre | Notes |
|---|---|---|---|---|---|
| Let Maskingevær M/?? (FN Herstal; Minimi) | | Belgium | Light machine gun | 5.56×45mm NATO | Used by the Frømandskorpset and the Jægerkorpset. |
| Let Maskingevær M/60 (U.S. Ordnance; M60E6) | | United States | General purpose machine gun | 7.62×51mm NATO | Supplied by US Ordnance, upgrade of the M60E4 to fit Danish requirements. Standard issue Danish LMG. More acquired 2025. |
| Let Maskingevær M/?? (FN Herstal; MAG) | | Belgium | General purpose machine gun | 7.62×51mm NATO | Used with: EH101 "Merlin" helicopter.; coaxial machine gun of the CV9035 after the MLU |
| Let Maskingevær M/62 (Rheinmetall; MG3) | | Germany | General purpose machine gun | 7.62×51mm NATO | Uses: Home Guard units; Vehicle mounted on the Leopard 2 and the CV90; Informal names: Nazisaven ("The Nazi saw"), Hitlersaven ("The Hitler saw"), Jødesaven ("The Jew saw") |
| Tungt Maskingevær M/2001 (Manroy Engineering; M2 Browning machine gun) | | Belgium (production / group base); United States (design) | Heavy machine gun | 12.7×99mm NATO | Mounted on vehicles or on tripods. Issued with: ELCAN Spectre DR 1,5-6×; ELCAN C79 TMG Night optic; Thermal in STAVS |

=== Precision rifles ===
| Model | Image | Origin (designed / made in) | Type | Calibre | Notes |
|---|---|---|---|---|---|
| Finskyttegevær, Kort (Colt Canada; C20 DMR) | | Canada (Group based in the United States) | Designated marksman rifle | 7.62×51mm NATO | Succeeded to the HK417. |
| Finskyttevåben M/04 (SAKO; TRG) | | Finland | Bolt-action sniper rifle | 8.6×70mm | Succeeds to the older model, the SAKO TRG-42 with Picatinny rails. |
| Finskyttevåben M/04 Updated Variant (SAKO; TRG A1) | | Finland | Bolt-action sniper rifle | 8.6×70mm | A new model has started circulating featuring a skeletonised stock and M-LOK and KeyMod attachment system. |

=== Anti-materiel rifles ===
| Model | Image | Origin (designed / made in) | Type | Calibre | Notes |
|---|---|---|---|---|---|
| Minerydningsgevær M/95 (Barrett Firearms Manufacturing; M82) | | United States | Anti-materiel rifle | 12.7×99mm NATO | Primary use for EOD. |
| Finskyttegevær, Lang (Accuracy International; AX50) | | United Kingdom | Anti-materiel rifle | 12.7×99mm NATO | Danish sniper's primary anti-materiel rifle. |

=== Hand grenades ===
| Model | Image | Origin (designed / made in) | Type | Charge | Notes |
|---|---|---|---|---|---|
| Håndgranat M/54 | | Denmark | Fragmentation grenade | 190g Trotyl | Issued with a new plastic hinge. Lethal mostly through overpressure, fragments provide a secondary lethal capacity. |
| Håndgranat M/85A3 (Rheinmetall; Type 85) | | Austria (Group based in Germany) | Fragmentation grenade (defensive and offensive configurations) | 50g Nitropenta 3,500 fragments (offensive configuration) | This grenade supplements the M/54 in cases where the M/54's power endanger the structure where it is used. |
| Minihåndgranat (Valsella Meccanotecnica; MISAR MU-50G) | | Italy | Mini-fragmentation grenade | 50g of Composition B 1,400 steel balls | |
| Chokgranat 1-Bang M/?? (Centanex; CTX-1-C) | | United Kingdom | Stun grenade | 1 charge | |
| Chokgranat 6 & 7-Bang M/05 (Centanex; CTX-6-OP; CTX-7-OP) | | United Kingdom | Stun grenade | 6 or 7 charges (depending on model) | |
| Røghåndgranat M/57 | | Denmark | Smoke grenade | Phosphorus | Fast expansion smoke grenade. |
| Røghåndbombe M/77 | | Denmark | Training smoke grenade | Hexit smoke grenade | Former standard-issue smoke grenade, now used for training purposes (poisonous gas problem). |
| Røghåndbombe KM M/93 | | Denmark | Smoke grenade | Unknown | Standard Issue smoke grenade. |
| Røghåndgranat M/03 | | Unknown | Smoke grenade | Phosphorus | Fast expansion smoke grenade, succeeding to the M/57. |
| Røghåndgranat M/10 | | Unknown | Signal smoke grenade | Hexit | Signal grenade that comes in: green; blue; orange |

=== Grenade launchers ===
| Model | Image | Origin (designed / made in) | Type | Calibre | Notes |
|---|---|---|---|---|---|
| GRK M/13 (Lewis Machine & Tool Company; M203 grenade launcher) | | United States | Grenade launcher | 40×46 mm LV | New modified M203 grenade launcher fitting the M10 rifle and with the ability to fire high-velocity grenades. It can be used standalone on a stock or mounted on the rifle. Grenades types: HE FRAG; HEAT; Flechette(used in Afghanistan; unknown if still in use); Rubber bullet; Smoke grenade; Stun grenade; Sponge grenade |
| GRK Super Six (Milkor; MGL) | | South Africa | Revolver grenade launcher | 40×46 mm LV | Used by the military police. Grenades types: HE FRAG; HEAT; Flechette(used in Afghanistan; unknown if still in use); Rubber bullet; Smoke grenade; Stun grenade; Sponge grenade |

=== Anti-tank weapons ===
| Model | Image | Origin (designed / made in) | Type | Role | Calibre | Notes |
|---|---|---|---|---|---|---|
| Panserværnsvåben M/72 ECLAW (Nammo; M72 EC) | | Norway (production / group base); United States (design) | Disposable rocket launcher | Anti-tank | 66 mm | ECLAW variant (enhanced capability light anti-tank weapon). Usually just referred to as PNÆV. |
| Panserværnsvåben M/95 (Saab Bofors Dynamics; AT4) | | Sweden | Disposable recoilless gun | Anti-tank | 84 mm | Used in limited quantities, as most have been donated to Ukraine. It remains the dominant anti-tank training weapon for HRU (Hærens Reaktionsstyrke Uddannelse) privates and the MBU (Mobilisering Basis Uddannelse) conscripts. |
| Dysekanon M4 (Saab Bofors Dynamics; Carl Gustav M4) | | Sweden | Reusable recoilless rifle | Multirole | 84 mm | It succeeded to the DYKN M/85 in 2022, and additional ones were ordered in November 2025. Ammunition types: HEAT; HEDP; HEAT TANDEM; HE FRAG; Dart; Illumination; Smoke; Has the informal name of Dødens Pusterør (Death Blowgun). |
| Panserværnsmissilsystem SPIKE (EuroSpike GmbH; SPIKE LR2) | | Germany (production / group base); Israel (design) | Man-portable missile | Anti-tank guided missile | 130 mm | Missile launcher used both for dismount units and from weapon stations (Protector RWS on the Piranha V and the Eagle V). Launcher used: iCLU (integrated control launch unit, the second generation of Spike launcher). |

=== Infantry indirect fire weapons ===
| Model | Image | Origin (designed / made in) | Type | Calibre | Quantity | Notes |
|---|---|---|---|---|---|---|
| Middel Tung Mortér M/81 (M252 Mortar) | | United Kingdom | Mortar | 81 mm | Unknown | Used by Slesvigske Fodregiment (Light infantry) |
| Tung Mortér M/10 (Soltam; K6) | | Israel | Mortar | 120mm | 20+ | |

=== Mines ===
| Model | Image | Origin (designed / made in) | Type | Charge | Notes |
|---|---|---|---|---|---|
| Alarmmine M/87 | | Unknown | Alarm mine | Phosphorus charge | Tripwire warning Device. |
| Personnelmine M/80 (Claymore) | | United States | Anti-personnel mine | 680g of C4 700 steel balls | Following the ratification of the Ottawa Treaty, it was modified to only be activated under command. Prior to that, it was possible to use it as a booby-trap / victim-activated system. |
| FFV-013 (Fordonsmina 013) | | Sweden | Anti-personnel mine | 1,200 steel balls | Following the ratification of the Ottawa Treaty, it was modified to only be activated under command. Prior to that, it was possible to use it as a booby-trap / victim-activated system. |
| Pansermine M/56 | | Denmark | Anti-tank mine | 7,2 kg of TNT | Part of the stockpile was donated to Ukraine. It is suspected to be based on the French M51/52 landmine (copy). |
| Pansermine M/88 (M15) | | United States | Anti-tank mine | 10.3 kg of Composition B | |

=== Weapons accessories ===
==== Sights ====
| Model | Image | Reticle | Origin (designed / made in) | Type | Notes |
|---|---|---|---|---|---|
| Termisk Kikkert M/23 (Pixels on Target VooDoo-S) | | | United States | Thermal sight (with weapon flip-mount) | New sight issued to the combat troops to replace the Insight MTM sight. It is capable of being: black hot; white hot; black edge; white edge |
| Termisk Kikkert M/09 (L3 Insight MTM monocular) | | | United States | Thermal sight | Used for detection of the enemy's heat signature. It can be used in hand-held configuration. A certain quantity was donated to Ukraine. |
| Raytheon ELCAN Optical Technologies; Spectre DR 1-4x 5.56 | | | Canada (Group based in the United States) | Variable prism sight | 1-4× magnification with a built-in red dot and custom reticle with bullet drop for the 5.56 calibre up to 500 meters. It is used with the M10 rifles. |
| Raytheon ELCAN Optical Technologies; Spectre DR 1-4x 7.62 | | | Canada (Group based in the United States) | Variable prism sight | 1-4× magnification with a built-in red dot and custom reticle with bullet drop for the 7.62 calibre up to 800 meters. It is used with the LMG M/60. |
| ELCAN Optical Technologies; Spectre DR 1.5-6x 12.7 | | | Canada (Group based in the United States) | Variable prism sight | 1.5-6× magnification with a built-in red dot and custom reticle with bullet drop for the 12.7 calibre up to 1200 meters. It is used on the TMG M/2001. |
| OPTI M/95 (ELCAN Optical Technologies; C79A2-1) | | | Canada | Prism sight | 3.4× magnification for the 5.56 calibre. It is being used by MBU conscripts (mobiliseringsværnepligt). It was replaced by the Elcan Spectre sights for the active service soldiers. |
| OPTI M/98 (ELCAN Optical Technologies; C79A2-1) | | | Canada | Prism sight | 3.4× magnification for the 7.62 calibre. It is being used by MBU conscripts (mobiliseringsværnepligt). It was replaced by the Elcan Spectre sights for the active service soldiers. |
| NATSI M/99 (ELCAN Optical Technologies ?) | | | Canada | Night sight | NVG optic used with the LMG M/60 and the M/62. It is being used by MBU conscripts (mobiliseringsværnepligt). It was replaced by the Termisk Kikkert M/23 for the active service soldiers. |
| Spuhr; GLSM | | | Sweden | Red dot sight | New red dot and red dot sightmount |
| Aimpoint; T1 Micro | | | Sweden | Red dot sight | Uses: M/95 Rifle, by the conscripts of the Livgarden; Sight of the grenade launchers.; Back-up sight for LMG M/60 (active service); Primary sight for Home Guard units |
| Rødpunktssigte M/04 (Aimpoint; CompM2 & M4S) | (Aimpoint CompM2) (Aimpoint M4S) | | Sweden | Red dot sight | Used by Home Guard units. Both optics fall under the name Rødpunktssigte M/04 |
| Magpul; M-Bus Flip Up Irons | | N/A | United States | Iron sight | Rifle back-up sight and used by HBU conscripts as primary sight. Part of the now replaced weapon package. |
| Mission First Tactical; Flip Up Irons | | N/A | United States | Iron sight | Part of the new weapon package introduced in 2022. |

==== Magazines ====
| Model | Image | Origin (designed / made in) | Type | Notes |
|---|---|---|---|---|
| Fiber Magasin (Diemaco; C7 Thermold STANAG Magazine) | | Canada | Polymer magazine | Remains in service in some HBU units This magazine has a tendency to cause feeding issues. |
| Aluminium Magasin (Colt's Manufacturing Company; USGI M4/M16 30RND Magazine) | | United States | STANAG magazine | It became the standard magazine after Colt acquisition of Diemaco. |
| PMAG (Magpul; PMAG 30 AR/M4 GEN M3 Window) | | United States | Magazine | Magazine type issued to active service personnel with Rangerplates as an option. |

==== Lights and Lasers ====
| Model | Image | Origin (designed / made in) | Type | Notes |
|---|---|---|---|---|
| Steiner Defense; D-BAL A3 | | United States | VIS/IR Laser sight with IR illuminator | Standard issue. |
| BROLIS; LP5X | | Lithuania | VIS/IR Laser sight with IR illuminator | Replacement for D-BAL A3 With visible laser, IR laser and IR illuminator |
| Steiner Defence; Mk4 Battle Light | | United States | Weapon mounted visible light | |
| Steiner Defence; Mk4 Battle Light Update | | United States | Weapon mounted light | Replacement for the MK4. |

==== Personnalisation parts ====
| Model | Image | Origin (designed / made in) | Type | Notes |
|---|---|---|---|---|
| Magpul; RVG | | United States | Vertical foregrip | Part of the now replaced weapon package. |
| TangoDown; BGV-MK46 | | United States | Vertical foregrip | Used with the LMG M/60. |
| Mission First Tactical; REACT | | United States | Vertical foregrip | Part of the new weapon package introduced in 2022. |
| Magpul; AFG2 | | United States | Angled foregrip | Part of the now replaced weapon package. |
| Brügger og Thomet; B&T USA Angled Foregrip | | United States (Group based in Switzerland) | Angled foregrip | Part of the new weapon package introduced in 2022. |
| Magpul; XTM HAND STOP KIT | | United States | Handstop | Part of the now replaced weapon package. |
| Ergo grips Surestop Tactical Handstop | | United States | Handstop | Part of the new weapon package introduced in 2022. |
| Magpul; CTR | | United States | Stock | Standard stock on all M10A4 rifles. Part of the now replaced weapon package. |
| Mission First Tactical; BATTLELINK Minimalist | | United States | Stock | Part of the new weapon package introduced in 2022. |
| Magpul; MIADGrip | | United States | Pistol grip | Standard grip on all M10A4 rifles. Part of the now replaced weapon package. |
| Mission First Tactical; Engage AR Grip | | United States | Pistol grip | Part of the new weapon package introduced in 2022. |
| Magpul; Ladder Rail Panel | | United States | Rail protector | Soft plastic rail protector. Part of the now replaced weapon package. |
| Magpul; XTM Rail Panel | | United States | Rail protector | Hard plastic rail protector. Part of the now replaced weapon package. |
| Ergo Grips; LOW-PRO LADDER RAIL COVER | | United States | Rail protector | Soft plastic rail protector. Part of the new weapon package introduced in 2022. |
| Ergo Grips; FULL LONG TEXTURED RAIL COVERS | | United States | Rail protector | Hard plastic rail protector. Part of the new weapon package introduced in 2022. |
| Blue Force Gear; Vickers combat applications sling | | United States | Rifle sling | Used with rifles. |
| Magpul; MS3 Multi Mission Sling | | United States | Rifle sling | Initially planned to replace most of the rifle slings during the Magpul contract but it was never issued in mass quantities. |
| Blue Force Gear; Vickers Padded Sling | | United States | Rifle sling | Newest sling introduced into service. |
| Blue Force Gear; Vickers M240 Sling | | United States | Machinegun sling | Used with rifles, and LMGs (with padding). |

== Personal equipment ==
=== Uniforms ===
| Model | Image | Camouflage | Origin (designed / made in) | Notes |
|---|---|---|---|---|
| Uniformssystem M/26 | | M/11 MTS (Multiterrænsløring) | United States | Replacement for the NCU Layer 2 system from Crye Precision after quality issues.: SMOCK; Field Shirt; G3 Combat shirt; G3 Pants |
| Nordic Combat Uniform M/XX | | M/11 MTS (Multiterrænsløring) | NORDEFCO (Original programme planners): Denmark; Norway; Sweden; Finland; Manufacture nations: United States (Gore-Tex); Greece (Siamidis); Sweden (Woolpower); Norway (Aclima & Oskar Pedersen AS) | New standard uniform system jointly developed by NORDEFCO members. It is produced by a consortium led by Oskar Pedersen AS and also includes: Aclima; Woolpower; Siamidis; Gore-Tex; The programme was initiated by Denmark and Norway in 2014, with the aim to replace their uniforms. Sweden joined the programme in 2016, and Finland joined at an unclear date. Note: a blue variant of the uniform will be introduced in the Royal Danish Navy as per the confirmation in 2024. The outer layers (Layer 2) of the NCU have been scrapped by DALO in favor of a Crye Precision after notable quality issues where found apparent in the NCU Layer 2. Layer 1, 3, and 4 will be retained. |
| Uniformssystem M/11 | | M/11 MTS (Multiterrænsløring) | Denmark | This standard uniform system is being phased out. Top layer in 3 different variants: LET (= light), as on the picture.; ALM (Almindelig = standard), a bit thicker than the LET variant, with a different pocket layout.; Regn (= rain), made of a rain jacket and pants with cutout which work with either the LET or the ALM variant.; Sub-layers: Dress shirt Short/Long (Khaki); Combat shirt (Multicam); Commando Pullover (Green); Fleece Wool Green (Green); Fleece Thermo Desert (Khaki) |
| CBRN-dragt M/13 | | M/11 MTS (Multiterrænsløring) | Unknown | CBRN suit, informally known as Bamsedragten, meaning teddybear suit, due to how thick and hot it is. Its successor will be adapted to the new uniform, the NCU system 2023–2025.) |
| Garnisonsuniform M/69 | | N/A | Denmark | Special occasion uniform used primarily by officers. |
| Royal Guard ceremonial uniform | | N/A | Denmark | Worn by Conscripts and NCOs of Livgarden when on ceremonial duty. |
| Guard Hussar ceremonial uniform | | N/A | Denmark | Worn by Conscripts, NCOs, and officers of the Gardehusar regimentet Hesteskadron when on ceremonial duty. |
| Hestra Gloves | N/A | N/A | Sweden | Combat gloves ordered in December 2024. |

=== Boots ===
| Model | Image | Colour | Origin (designed / made in) | Notes |
|---|---|---|---|---|
| Kampstøvle, Let, M/18, Haix (HAIX Forsvaret Combat Boot Light modified HAIX BLACK EAGLE NATURE) | | Brown | Germany | Garrison use. Being replaced in 2024. |
| Kampstøvle, Svær, M/18, Haix (HAIX Forsvaret Combat Boot Heavy modified Haix Nepal Pro) | | Brown | Germany | Combat use. Being replaced. |
| Kampstøvle, Let, M/18, AKU (AKU Pilgrim GTX Combat) | | Brown | United States | Garrison use. Being replaced as of 2024. |
| Kampstøvle, Svær, M/18, AKU (AKU Griffon Combat) | | Brown | United States | Combat use. Being replaced as of 2024. |
| Kampstøvle, Let, M/18, Meindl (Meindl Dovre Extreme) | | Brown | United States | Garrison use. Being replaced as of 2024. |
| Kampstøvle, Svær, M/18, Meindl (?) | | Brown | United States | Combat use. Being replaced as of 2024. |
| Støvle Sikkerhed M/14 (?) | | Brown | Unknown | Safety Boot. |
| Ørken støvle M/?? (Unknown AKU Boot) | | Tan | United States | Combat use. |
| Kampstøvle, Jungle M/?? (Unknown Iturri Boot) | | | Spain | Combat use. |
| Kampstøvle, Cold Weather M/?? (Unknown Iturri Boot) | | | Spain | Combat use. |

=== Load-carrying equipment and personal protection equipment ===
| Model | Image | Camouflage | Origin (designed / made in) | Type | Protection level | Notes |
|---|---|---|---|---|---|---|
| Oppakningssystem M/96 (PLCE) | | M/84 Pletsløring | United Kingdom | Tactical webbing systems | N/A | Used in basic training by HBU conscripts and the Home Guard. Internal name Basis M/96. |
| Oppakningssystem M/25 (?) | | M/11 MTS (Multiterrænsløring) | ? | Tactical webbing systems | N/A | Used in basic training by HBU conscripts and the Home Guard. Replacement for the M/96 to ensure compatibility with the MOLLE pouches from TYR tactical. Internal name Basis M/25. |
| Rygsæk M/17 35L (Karrimor SF; THOR 35) | | M/11 MTS (Multiterrænsløring) | United Kingdom | Daysack | N/A | Standard issue daysack, originally developed for the Danish army being released later for the civilian market as the THOR. |
| Rygsæk M/17 70L (KarrimorSF; Odin75) | | M/11 MTS (Multiterrænsløring) | United Kingdom | Backpack | N/A | Standard issue 3 day backpack, originally developed for the Danish army being released later for the civilian market as the ODIN. |
| Rygsæk M/17, HLC (Karrimor SF; LOKI) | | M/11 MTS (Multiterrænsløring) | United Kingdom | Load carrying system | N/A | Load carrying system to carry heavier equipment such as jerrycans, ammunition boxes or ECM Jammers originally developed for the Danish army being released later for the civilian market as the LOKI. |
| Beskyttelsesvest Svær M/26 (TYR Tactical; MALE PICO-MVW) | | M/11 MTS (Multiterrænsløring) | United States | Plate carrier | Plate dependent Built in PSA2/DK soft armour | New plate carrier update with a focus on giving the soldier a smaller profile, better + lighter protection and better mobility. Also sees the move away from legacy molle to lasercut molle. |
| Beskyttelsesvest Svær M/26 (TYR Tactical; FEMALE PICO-MVW) | | M/11 MTS (Multiterrænsløring) | United States | Plate carrier | Plate dependent Built in PSA2/DK soft armour | New plate carrier update with a focus on giving the soldier a smaller profile, better + lighter protection and better mobility. Also sees the move away from legacy molle to lasercut molle. Plates inserted externally instead of the traditional internal layout. |
| Beskyttelsesvest Svær M/12 (TYR Tactical; PICO-MV DK) | | M/11 MTS (Multiterrænsløring) | United States | Plate carrier | Plate dependent Built in NFA3/10 soft armor. | Introduced as a part of the part of the 2012 "beskyttelsesudrustning" set that was introduced due to soldiers being uncomfortable in the issued equipment and spending fortunes on their own. Standard PPE system of the Danish Armed Forces and Home Guard Response units. |
| Beskyttelsesvest Svær Kvinde M/12 (TYR Tactical; Female PICO-MV.) | | M/11 MTS (Multiterrænsløring) | United States | Plate carrier | Plate dependent Built in NFA3/10 soft armor. | Female carrier that that improves comfort for female soldiers by moving the plates to be external instead of internal. |
| Beskyttelsesvest Let M/12 (TYR Tactical; MV RLVC) | | M/11 MTS (Multiterrænsløring) | United States | Plate carrier | Plate dependent Built in NFA3/10 soft armor. | Driver model of the M/12 Beskyttelsesvest without MOLLE and side plates removed to make it easier to get into IFV, MBT and so on. |
| BROKOS bælte M/12 (TYR Tactical; Load Carriage Gunfighter Belt) | | M/11 MTS (Multiterrænsløring) | United States | Battlebelt | Built in NFA3/10 soft armor Being transitioned to PSA2/DK | Issued alongside a Beskyttelsesvest Svær. |

=== Helmets ===
| Model | Image | Camouflage | Origin (designed / made in) | Type | Protection level | Notes |
|---|---|---|---|---|---|---|
| Telehjelm Skal M/?? (Gentex; Combat Vehicle Crewman Helmet System) | | | United States | Communication helmet | Fragmentation protection | Shell for the Gentex-Bose A3206101-M Headset Used by vehicle crews to be replaced but still widely used. To be replaced. |
| Telehjelm Skal M/?? (Racal Acoustics; Ballistic helmet v50) | | M/11 MTS (Multiterrænsløring) | United Kingdom (Group based in the Denmark) | Communication helmet for armoured fighting vehicle crews | Unknown | V50 Shell for the new RA4000 Magna Used by vehicle crews. Replacement for the old telehjelm has appeared a couple times in some units. |
| Hjelm M/10 (Gentex; USGI ACH) | | | United States | Ballistic helmet | NIJ IIIA | Was quickly bought in for the War in Afghanistan where soldiers had issues with the M/96. Was never a standard issue. Used mainly by the Danish ISAF teams, still sees some use on MBU conscripts of the Gardehusar regimentet. |
| Hjelm M/12 (Revision; Batlskin Cobra) | | M/11 MTS (Multiterrænsløring) | United States | Ballistic helmet | NIJ IIIA | Introduced as a part of the part of the 2012 "beskyttelsesudrustning" set Was supposed to become the standard-issue helmet but for unknown reasons was restricted to deployments only. Replaced by M/20 but still used by Home Guard units and some active units. |
| Hjelm M/20 Ikke operationel (Galvion; Batlskin PDXT Basic) | | M/11 MTS (Multiterrænsløring) | Canada | Training helmet | N/A | Standard issue for conscripts. The Non-Operational helmet is meant for HBU conscripts to ensure they are not injured. Informally referred to as "Cykelhjelmen" (bicycle helmet) due to its lack of ballistic protection. |
| Hjelm M/20 Operationel (Galvion; Batlskin PDXT Mid-Cut) | | M/11 MTS (Multiterrænsløring) | Canada | Mid-cut ballistic Helmet | Classified as it is not on the civilian market | Older variant of the standard Issue Initial order in 2023, |
| Hjelm M/20 Operationel (Galvion; Batlskin PDXT High-Cut) | | M/11 MTS (Multiterrænsløring) | Canada | High-cut ballistic Helmet | Classified as it is not on the civilian market | Standard Issue New high-cut variant of the M/20 helmet ordered in 2026. |
| Hjelm M/? (Revision; Batlskin Viper P2) | | M/11 MTS (Multiterrænsløring) | Canada | High-cut ballistic Helmet | NIJ IIIA | High-Cut helmet issued to sniper team and JTAC. Being phased out as they wear out by Galvion Caiman. |
| Hjelm M/? (Galvion; Batlskin Caiman) | | M/11 MTS (Multiterrænsløring) | Canada | High-cut ballistic Helmet | NIJ IIIA Addon armor possible | High-Cut helmet issued to sniper team, JTAC and SOKOM after Revision Military became Galvion |
| Hjelm M/? (Gentex; OPS-CORE FAST) | | M/11 MTS (Multiterrænsløring) | United States | High-cut ballistic Helmet | NIJ IIIA 7.62×39mm protection possible with SLAAP | High-Cut Helmet issued to SOKOM |

=== Eye protection ===
| Model | Image | Origin (designed / made in) | Type | Notes |
|---|---|---|---|---|
| Beskyttelses Brille, Vapor M/19 (WileyX; VAPOR 2.5) | | United States | Glasses | Current standard eye pro |
| Beskyttelses Brille, Saber M/19 (WileyX; Saber Advanced) | | United States | Glasses | Originally introduced as an option for people with different nose structure Later introduced as one of the two standard issue |
| Motorbrille M/19 (WileyX; Rogue Comm) | | United States | Goggle | Driving goggles that sit tight to protect against stone throws on roadways |
| Beskyttelses Visir M/12 (Revision; Batlskin Cobra Visor) | | United States | Visor | Part of the 2012 "beskyttelsesudrustning" set. Bought in limited quantities for the M/12 Helmet to protect vehicle crews in the open from hatches or weapon platforms. Compatible with the M/20 helmet as well |

=== Face wear ===
| Model | Image | Origin (designed / made in) | Type | Notes |
|---|---|---|---|---|
| Kæbebeskytter M/12 (Revision; Batlskin Cobra Mandible) | | United States | Ballistic face mask | Introduced as part of the 2012 "beskyttelsesudrustning" set to protect soldiers in open tops |
| CBRN-maske M/18 (3M Scott Fire & Safety; General Service Respirator) | | United States (production / group base) United Kingdom (design) | CBRN mask | Standard Issue CBRN Mask Originally designed by the Defence Science and Technology Laboratory in the UK and manufactured by 3M. |

=== Work tools ===
| Model | Image | Origin (designed / made in) | Type | Notes |
|---|---|---|---|---|
| Feltspade M/96 (Glock GmbH; Entrenching tool) | | Austria | Entrenching tool | Standard issue. |
| Foldekniv (Victorinox; Swiss Army knife) | | Switzerland | Multi-tool | Issued to HBU/MBU conscripts as general purpose multi-tool. |
| Multi-Tool (Victorinox; Swiss Tool) | | Switzerland | Multi-tool | Issued to Konstabelelev and above as general purpose multi-tool. |
| Pigtrådssaks M/X (M1938 Wire cutter) | | United States | Wire cutter | Wire cutter. |
| M/?? | | Unknown | Hammering / Breaching tool | Has the informal name "Jomfrutrøster" (Virgins comfort). |

== Tactical and communication equipment ==
=== Communications systems ===
| Model | Image | Origin (designed / made in) | Type | Notes |
|---|---|---|---|---|
| Sepura STP9000 Tetra | | United Kingdom | VHF/UHF radio | Garrison guard units and HBU Conscripts |
| RDO152 (Harris AN/PRC-152) | | United States | VHF/UHF radio | Standard VHF/UHF Radio |
| RDO SPR (Harris RF-7800S Secure Personal Radio) | | United States | UHF radio | Standard UHF Radio |
| Harris RF-5800H | | United States | HF radio | Standard HF Radio |
| Harris AN/PRC-117C | | United States | HF radio | |
| Harris AN/PRC-117G | | United States | Satellite radio | Satellite radio for JTAC |
| Harris RF-7880NR | | United States | High-capacity data radio | UHF Data Radio |

=== Hearing protection / Communication microphones ===
| Model | Image | Origin (designed / made in) | Type | Notes |
|---|---|---|---|---|
| Headset Invisio (Invisio Group; Invisio X5) | | Denmark | Active in-ear bone conduction headset | Bought originally in black and then later in tan |
| Headset Invisio (Invisio Group; Invisio X7) | | Denmark | Active in-ear bone conduction headset | Replacement for the Inviso X5 |
| Headset MSA (Sordin MSA) | | Sweden | Active headset | Being replaced by Peltor XPI |
| Headset Comtac (3M Comtac Peltor XPI) | | United States | Active headset | Primarily only arrived thus far at SOKOM and combat units. Replacing Sordin MSA |
| Telehjelm M/?? (Bose; A3206101-M Headset) | | United States | Communication headset | Used by vehicle crews to be replaced but still widely used. To be replaced. |
| Telehjelm M/?? (Invisio Group; RA4000 Magna) | | United Kingdom (Group based in the Denmark) | Active headset | Used by vehicle crews. Replacement for the old telehjelm has appeared a couple times in some units. |

=== Navigation equipment ===
| Model | Image | Origin (designed / made in) | Type | Notes |
|---|---|---|---|---|
| DAGR (AN/PSN-13 DAGR) | | United States | GPS receiver | GPS |
| Systematic A/S; SitaWare | Illustration | Denmark | Battle management system | Large scale C4ISR system. |

=== Nightvision goggles ===
| Model | Image | Origin (designed / made in) | Type | Notes |
|---|---|---|---|---|
| Nat-brille M/97 (AN/PVS-7) | | United States | Biocular, monocular, night vision device (3rd gen) | Used by HBU conscripts. Informally referred to a "Pik i panden" (Dick in forehead). |
| Nat-brille M/03 (AN/PVS-14) | | United States | Monocular, night vision device (3rd gen) | The former standard-issue monocular that has been replaced by the M/18 Nat-brille. Originally purchased from ITT Industries in 03. Used by HRU and HBU conscripts. |
| Nat-brille M/18 (Theon Argus FS) | | Denmark (licence production) Greece (design / group base) | Monocular, night vision device (3rd+ gen) | Standard issue, progressively replacing M/03. Purchases: 1,500 in 2025 |

=== Flare guns ===
| Model | Image | Origin (designed / made in) | Type | Notes |
|---|---|---|---|---|
| Signalpistol M/58 | | United Kingdom | Flare gun | Used for battlefield illumination. Informally referred to as Sørøveren ("The Pirate") due to it looking like an old flintlock. |
| Signalpistol M/61 (Leuchtpistole 34) | | Germany | Flare gun | Used for battlefield illumination. Replacement for the M/58 Reproduction of the original Walther Leuchtpistole 34 with a new grip made by WISCH. |

=== Spotting/observation equipment ===
| Model | Image | Origin (designed / made in) | Type | Notes |
|---|---|---|---|---|
| JIM-LR (Safran Electronics & Defense) | | Switzerland (Group based in France) | Multifunctional optronic device | Used for ranging and detection of enemy heat signatures. |
| JIM-LR Compact (Safran Electronics & Defense) | | Switzerland (Group based in France) | Multifunctional optronic device | Compact version of the JIM LR for sniper teams. |
| LAM M/19 (Safran Vectronix AG; Terrapin X) | | Switzerland | Laser range finder | Infantry range finder. |
| LAM M/?? (Wilcox Industries RAPTAR S) | | United States | Rifle mounted laser range finder | |
| Spotting Scope M/20 (Hensoldt Spotter 60) | | Germany | Spotter scope | For sniper teams |
| M/51 Kikkert (Hensoldt /Zeiss Fernglas FERO D16) | | Germany | Binoculars | General use binocular |
| Swarovski; 8×30 binoculars small | | Austria | Binoculars | 5,000 ordered in 2025 for use at squad and platoon level. |
| Swarovski; 7×42 binoculars medium | | Austria | Binoculars | 4,000 ordered in 2025 for use as standard binoculars for the Home Guard and other units. |
| Swarovski; 10×40 binoculars large | | Austria | Binoculars | 1,000 ordered in 2025 for use by observers, senior officers, and commanders of advanced weapon systems where range and details are important. |

=== Mine clearing tools ===
| Model | Image | Origin (designed / made in) | Type | Notes |
|---|---|---|---|---|
| Minerydningsslange M/97 (Ensign-Bickford Aerospace & Defense MPLC NSN # 1375-01-450-3897) | | United States | Mine-clearing line charge | Some donated to Ukraine. Line made of PBX, length of 25 meters. |
| Minerydningsslange M/23 (Ensign-Bickford Aerospace & Defense MLPC NSN # 1375-01-593-8347) | | United States | Mine-clearing line charge | New model of the old M/97. Line made of PBX, length of 25 meters. |
| AeroVironment tEODor Explosive Ordnance Robot | | United States | Demining robot | Known in the public by the Rullemarie(Rolling Marie). It can be equipped with a knife, a water jet, a shotgun or X-RAY |

== Vehicles ==
=== Armoured ===
| Model | Image | Origin (designed / made in) | Type | Quantity | Armaments | Calibre | Protection | Notes |
|---|---|---|---|---|---|---|---|---|
| KraussMaffei; Leopard 2A7DK | | Germany | Main battle tank | 44 | Rh-120 L/55 A1 120 mm: APFSDS Tungsten; Canister; HEAT; Coaxial MG3 Smoke | 120×570mm NATO; 7.62×51mm NATO | Armour: Classified non-explosive reactive armor; Passive Protection: SAAB Barracuda MCS | 44 Leopard 2A7DK in active service. SAAB Barracuda added in 2022. |
| BAE Systems Hägglunds; CV9035DK MKIIIA | | Sweden (Group based in the UK) | Infantry fighting vehicle | 44 | Bushmaster III 35 mm: APFSDS Tungsten; APDS Tungsten; ABM-KETF; HEI; Coaxial FN MAG Smoke | 35×228mm NATO; 7.62×51mm NATO | Armour: Base level STANAG 4569 Level 4+ (resists to 20 mm calibre); Additional armour possible with the actual level being classified; Passive Protection: SAAB Barracuda MCS; Possibility of SLAT armour | Denmarks IFV with a 35mm mounted by Hydrema. Can carry 7 armored infantrymen in the back. Originally planned to be updated to the CV9035 MLU 2025-2029. The MLU upgrade being an update to the MKIV standard with D-series turret. But the upgrade would take until 2033, so instead 44 new ones were ordered (delivery until 2030) and the old ones phased out, possibly used for spare parts. |
| Patria; XA-300 | | Finland | Amphibious APC | 130 | M2 Browning machine gun (M18 ring turret from Sima Innovation) | 12.7×99mm NATO | Armour: Base Level STANAG 4569 Level 2 | |
| General Dynamics European Land Systems; Piranha V | | Switzerland (Group based in the USA) | Armoured personnel carrier | 309 | Current Armament: M2 Browning machine gun STAVS Protector; M2 Browning machine gun tower; Cardom; Planned Armament: Skyranger 30; Oerlikon KCE with AHEAD ammo; Mistral missile | Type dependent: 12.7×99mm NATO; 120mm (mortar); Future: 30×173 mm STANAG 4624 | Armour: Base level STANAG 4569 level 4; Additional armour is possible, actual level classified; Passive Protection: SAAB Barracuda MCS | Versions: Armoured personnel carriers; Communications and information systems carriers; Command and control vehicles; Engineer Vehicles; 37 armoured ambulances; 15 mortar carriers; Planned: 16 SHORAD |
| Mowag; Piranha IIIC | | Switzerland | Armoured fighting vehicle | ~90 | M2 Browning machine gun | 12.7×99mm NATO | Armour: Base level STANAG 4569 level 2; Additional armour possible, actual level classified | The Danish military secondary APC still sees use according to the defence. 19 Piranha IIIH donated to Moldova. |
| General Dynamics European Land Systems; Eagle V | | Switzerland (Group based in the USA) | Infantry mobility vehicle | 93 | Current armament: M2 Browning machine gun STAVS Protector; In testing phase: SPIKE LR2 ATGM | Type dependent: 12.7×99mm NATO; 130mm (ATGM) | Armour: Base level STANAG 4569 level 1; Additional armour is possible actual level classified; Passive Protection: SAAB Barracuda MCS | The primary Infantry mobility vehicle used by the Danish army. Used for: Patrol; Electronic warfare; Support and logistic; Closed reconnaissance; Utility; Planned: ATGM carrier |
| Mowag; Eagle IV | | Switzerland (Group based in the USA) | Infantry mobility vehicle | 85 | M2 Browning machine gun STAVS Lemur | 12.7×99mm NATO | Armour: Base level STANAG 4569 level 3; Additional armour is possible actual level classified | Used mainly for training purposes as it has mostly been replaced by the V model. Used for: Patrol; Electronic warfare; Support and logistic; Closed reconnaissance; Utility |
| SC Group; HMT 400 | | United Kingdom | Light armored car | 15 | Unknown | Unknown | Unknown | Used by the Jægerkorpset. |
| FMC Corporation; M113 G4 DK | | United States | Armoured personnel carrier | Unknown | N/A | N/A | Armour: STANAG 4569 level 3 | Replaced by the Piranha V. Still used for fire fighting at Shooting ranges. Its snow clearing duty has also been replaced by the Piranha V. |
| Toyota; Land Cruiser; J100 VX; J200 GXR (first and second facelift) | | Japan | Lightly armoured vehicle | 6 | N/A | N/A | Armour: SVOS AGP DOT 358 internal armour; SVOS Saint-Gobain R 2710 armoured glass | For VIP protection teams at the Jægerkorps. |

=== Indirect fire ===
| Model | Image | Origin (designed / made in) | Type | Calibre | Quantity | Notes |
|---|---|---|---|---|---|---|
| Elbit Systems; Cardom | | Austria (production) Israel (design / group) | Mortar carrier | 120 mm 12.7mm | 15 | The Cardom is a heavy mortar with the A3MS FCS which features BMS integration, Fire/Control group, and fire coordination module made by the Austrian ESLAIT all integrated on the Piranha V by General Dynamics European Land Systems. Mortar tube itself delivered Amountion load out: HE; Smoke; Illumination |
| Elbit Systems; PULS | | Israel | Multiple rocket launcher | 122mm 160mm 306mm 370mm | 8 | Mounted on the Tatra 815-7 Force 6×6 truck. Expected to be fully operational in 2026. |
| Elbit Systems; ATMOS 2000 8x8 | | Israel | Self-propelled howitzer | 155 mm L/52 | 19 | Replacement for the 19 CAESAR 8×8 donated to Ukraine. Test model is installed on Tatra T815 8×8 although DALO has not yet selected the platform. Fully operational 2025. |

=== Trucks ===
| Model | Image | Origin (designed / made in) | Type | Quantity | Notes |
|---|---|---|---|---|---|
| Rheinmetall MAN Military Vehicles; HX series of trucks | | Austria Germany | Truck | Unknown | The HX truck series serves as part of the logistics backbone of danish army with many different models, including 8×8, 6×6 and 4×4 variants. They can be armoured and unarmoured, terrain or road going. They are used in for multiple roles. |
| Scania AB series of trucks | | Sweden | Truck | ~950 | The Scania truck series serves as part of the logistics backbone of danish army with many different models, including 8×8, 6×6 and 4×4 variants. They can be armoured and unarmoured, terrain or road going. They are used in for multiple roles. |

=== Light vehicles ===
| Model | Image | Origin (designed / made in) | Type | Quantity | Notes |
Military utility vehicles
| Mercedes-Benz; G-Class W464 | | Austria (Group based in Germany) | Unarmoured 4×4 | 400 (+600 in option) | Ordered in June 2025. Variants: Basic variant for the land forces; Command variant; Danish Home Guard, equipped with a roof-mounted light machine gun; Variant for Air Force; Variant for the military police |
| Mercedes-Benz; G Class | | Austria (Group based in Germany) | Mobility vehicle | Unknown | Multiple Variants: Mercedes G270CDI/28; Mercedes G280CDI/28; Mercedes 290GD; Mercedes 300GE/28 (EOD); Partially phased out from operational use by the Eagle family but still around as a utility vehicle at bases. Further replacement ongoing following the 2025 order of the Mercedes-Benz G-Class. |
| Nissan; Navara | | Japan | Light utility vehicle | 100 | 128 ordered in 2013, 100 for the Army, 28 for the Navy. |
| Chevrolet silverado | | United States | Mobility vehicle | Unknown | First seen in October 2026, reason unknown |
Civilian vehicles
| Mercedes-Benz Sprinter 212 | | Germany | Light utility vehicle | Unknown | |
| Mercedes-Benz; Vito 113 Tourer | | Germany | Minibus | Unknown | General non-tactical transport. |
| Mercedes-Benz; Vito W447 Tourer | | Germany | Minibus (7 passengers) | Unknown | 600 purchased in 2017. |
| Mercedes-Benz; Vito W447 Mixto | | Germany | Minibus (5 passengers + cargo) | Unknown | 75 purchased in 2017. |
| Mercedes-Benz; Vito W447 | | Germany | Minibus | 50 | 50 purchased in 2017, based on the 4×4 chassis. Purchased in multiple specialised variants. |
| Peugeot; Model 308 | | France | Service car for officers | Unknown | |

=== All-terrain vehicle ===
| Model | Image | Origin (designed / made in) | Type | Quantity | Notes |
|---|---|---|---|---|---|
| Polaris Inc. MRZR-D4 | | United States | ATV | Unknown | Used by the SOKOM / JGK. |
| Polaris Inc. Sportsman 570 Big Boss 6×6 | | United States | ATV | 47 | Order in 2024: 44 specially adapted variants; 3 standard variants |
| Polaris Inc. Sportsman 570 ×2 | | United States | ATV | 5 | 5 ordered in 2024. |

=== Unmanned ground vehicle ===
| Model | Image | Origin (designed / made in) | Type | Quantity | Notes |
|---|---|---|---|---|---|
| Milrem Robotics; THeMIS | | Estonia | UGV | 4 | Vehicle mass 1600kg. Used in testing and evaluation. Vehicle manufacturer Milrem Robotics. At least one to be equipped with 7.62 mm machine gun. |
| XRC Robotics; MFP-1 | | United Kingdom | UGV | 4 | Vehicle mass 25kg. Used in testing and evaluation. Vehicle manufacturer XRC Robotics. |
| Dropla; Dropla 4x4 | | Denmark | UGV | 9 | To be used for trainning conscripts on drone operation |

== Motorcycles ==
| Model | Image | Origin (designed / made in) | Type | Notes |
|---|---|---|---|---|
| Kawasaki; KLR650 | | Japan | Motorcycles | |
| KTM; 450 EXC | | Austria | Dirt bike | Used by SOKOM. |

== Engineering equipment ==
=== Mine clearing vehicles ===
| Model | Image | Origin (designed / made in) | Type | Quantity | Notes |
|---|---|---|---|---|---|
| Pansret minerydningskøretøj, PNMIRK (Flensburger Fahrzeugbau; Wisent 1 ARV Mineplough) | | Germany | Armoured mine clearance vehicle | 2 | 2 transformed from the Pansret bjærgningsvogn (FFG Wisent 1 ARV). Equipped with a Pearson Engineering mineplough. |
| PNMIRK/PNINK; Pansret minerydningskøretøj/Pansret Ingeniørkøretøj (Flensburger Fahrzeugbau; Wisent 2 AEV) | | Germany | Mine clearing vehicle and armoured engineering vehicle | Unknown (+ 6 on order) | Order of 6 Wisent 2 MCV/AEV in July 2024. The delivery is planned to start in 2025. Canada is lending several Wisent 2 for the training of the Danish crews until the delivery of the first model. |
| MineWold SPARK II minerulle, MIRR ( Multi-vehicle mounting) | | United States (vehicle) Switzerland (design / made) (group based in the UK) | Mine clearing vehicle | Unknown | |
| Hydrema; MCV 910 | | Denmark | Mine clearing vehicle | Unknown | Some were supplied to Ukraine. |

=== Recovery and repair equipment ===
| Model | Image | Origin (designed / made in) | Type | Quantity | Notes |
|---|---|---|---|---|---|
| Pansret bjærgningsvogn (Flensburger Fahrzeugbau; Wisent 1 ARV) | | Germany | Armoured recovery vehicle | Unknown | 5 ordered in December 2006, delivered by February 2008. 2 were transformed in mine clearing vehicles. Some were supplied to Ukraine. |
| PNBJVG; Panserbjergningvogn (Flensburger Fahrzeugbau; Wisent 2 ARV) | | Germany | Armoured recovery vehicle | Unknown (+11 on order) | Order of 11 Wisent 2 recovery vehicles in July 2024, with the delivery planned to start in 2025. Canada is lending several Wisent 2 for the training of the Danish crews until the delivery of the first model. |
| Pansret Lastvogn Bjærgningsvogn BJVG (MAN; SX45) | | Germany | Heavy tactical armoured recovery vehicle | 14 | Made by Miller Industries Towing Equipment Inc, equipped with: Crane: Atlas 600.2, 15-ton; Main winch: Rötzler RT200, 25-ton; Self-recovery winch: Rötzler RT080, 8-ton; Third winch: Rötzler HZ010, 1.2-ton |
| UNIC URW-1006+ | | Japan | Mini-crawler telescopic crane | 12 | Delivered in 2020. Used for repair and maintenance. |
| FRSN M/18; Forward repair system NATO (Glaucus) | | Denmark | Repair station container with crane | 6 | 15 purchased, 9 transferred to Ukraine. |
| FRSN M/23; Forward repair system NATO (Glaucus) | | Denmark | Repair station container with crane | – | Improved variant of the forward repair system NATO, made by Glaucus in Denmark. |

=== Bridging equipment ===
| Model | Image | Origin (designed / made in) | Type | Quantity | Notes |
|---|---|---|---|---|---|
| KNDS Deutschland; Leopard 2 Leguan | | Germany (Group based in the Netherlands) | Armoured vehicle-launched bridge | 2 (+5 on order) | 7 ordered on new chassis in December 2019. First delivered in February 2025. Order includes: 14 × 14-meters-span; 7 × 26-meters-span; 7 × semi-trailers for the transport of bridges; Training simulators |
| KNDS UK; Dry Support Bridge | | United Kingdom (Group based in the Netherlands) | Military bridge | 0 (+2 on order) | 2 ordered in 2025, delivery for 2028. Specifications: MLC 120; Up to 46 meters long; 90 minutes to erect |
| General Dynamics European Land Systems; M3 Amphibious Bridge | | Germany (Group based in the US) | Amphibious bridging vehicle | Unknown | Ordered in September 2025. |

=== Construction machines ===
| Model | Image | Origin (designed / made in) | Type | Quantity | Notes |
|---|---|---|---|---|---|
| JCB; HMEE | | United Kingdom | Armoured backhoe loader | 6 | Received in 2020. |
| Liebherr-Werk Bischofshofen GmbH; L544 | Illustration | Austria (Group based in Switzerland) | Wheel-loader | Unknown | |
| Moxy; MT 30 R | | Norway | Articulated hauler | Unknown | |
| Hydrema; 906G | (in SK/80 green) | Denmark | Articulated backhoe loader | Unknown | Delivered from December 2025 to 2026, acquired for the Army and the Arctic Command. |
| Hydrema; 922G | (in SK/80 green) | Denmark | Articulated dump truck, 20 tons | Unknown | Delivered from December 2025 to 2026, acquired for the Army and the Arctic Command. |

=== Handling equipment ===
| Model | Image | Origin (designed / made in) | Type | Quantity | Notes |
|---|---|---|---|---|---|
| Manitowoc; Grove GMK 4080-1 | | Germany (Group based in the US) | Mobile crane | Unknown | |
| Kalmar; RT-240 | | Sweden | Rough terrain container handler | 3 | Acquired in 2008 |

== Aircraft ==
=== Helicopters ===
All army helicopters have been transferred to Helicopter Wing Karup, a joint helicopter command under the Royal Danish Air Force.

=== Unmanned aerial vehicles ===
| Model | Image | Origin (designed / made in) | Type | Role | Quantity | Notes |
|---|---|---|---|---|---|---|
| AeroVironment; RQ-20 Puma | | United States | Fixed-wing UAV | ISR | — | Used by the Efterretningsregimentets UAS units. |
| AeroVironment; JUMP-20 | | United States | Fixed-wing VTOL CapableUAV | ISR | — | Replacement for the aging RQ-20. |
| eBee VISION; AgEagle Aerial Systems | | United States | Fixed-wing UAV | ISR | 3 | |
| UPTEKO; Tactical FPV Drone | | Denmark | Quadcopter FPV Drone | Loitering munition | -- | Information regarding UPTEKO drones is quite unclear all that is known is that 4 models for 4 roles have been procured and they come from UPTEKOs tactical line |
| UPTEKO; Tactical Delivery Drone | | Denmark | Quadcopter | Delivery drone | -- | Information regarding UPTEKO drones is quite unclear all that is known is that 4 models for 4 roles have been procured and they come from UPTEKOs tactical line |
| UPTEKO; Tactical Survailance Drone | | Denmark | Quadcopter | Survailance drone | -- | Information regarding UPTEKO drones is quite unclear all that is known is that 4 models for 4 roles have been procured and they come from UPTEKOs tactical line |
| UPTEKO; Tactical Mine Clearing Drone | | Denmark | ? | Mine clearing drone | -- | Information regarding UPTEKO drones is quite unclear all that is known is that 4 models for 4 roles have been procured and they come from UPTEKOs tactical line Whether this drone is a ground based mine clearing drone or arial mine detection drone is unspecified |
| FLIR Unmanned Aerial Systems AS; Black Hornet PRS | | Norway | Micro multicopter UAV | ISR | — | Unknown quantity. |

== Future equipment ==
=== Equipment ordered ===
==== Personal equipment ====
| Model | Image | Origin (designed / made in) | Type | Phase in year | Notes |
|---|---|---|---|---|---|
| Nat-brille M/XX (L3 Harris GPNVG-18) | | United States | WFoV Night Vision Device | — | Interest shown by FMI in 2019, progress and intended users unknown. |

==== Vehicles ====
| Model | Image | Origin (designed / made in) | Type | Quantity | Armaments | Calibre | Protection | Phase in year | Notes |
|---|---|---|---|---|---|---|---|---|---|
| BAE Systems Hägglunds; CV9035MKIIIC | | Sweden (Group based in the UK) | Infantry fighting vehicle | 159 | Bushmaster III 35 mm; APFSDS Tungsten; APDS Tungsten; ABM-KETF; HEI; Spike LR2; Coaxial FN Mag; Smoke | 35×228mm NATO 7.62×51mm NATO | Armour: Base Level STANAG 4569 Level 4+; Additional armour possible with the actual level being classified; Passive Protection: SAAB Barracuda MCS; Possibility of SLAT armour; Active Protection: Iron Fist APS | 2026 - 2029 | Orders: 115 in August 2024; 44 in November 2025; Equipped with the MKIV D-series turret. Using the SAAB Barracuda camouflage. Trials in March 2025. This CV90 can carry 7 dismounts. |
| Dynamit Nobel Defence GmbH; Skorpion 2 | | Germany | Minelayer | 8 | N/A | N/A | Unknown | 2026 | Vehicle platform is yet to be determined |
| Mercedes-Benz; Enok | | Austria (Group based in Germany) | Light reconnaissance vehicle, 4×4 | Limited amount for testing | M60E6 In ringmount | 7.62×51mm NATO | — | — | Ordered in December 2025 (2-digit quantity for phase 1). |
| Rheinmetall MAN Military Vehicles; HX2 series | | Austria (production / assembly) Germany (design / production / group base) | Tactical truck | Unspecified | N/A | N/A | — | 2026 - 2028 | Ordered in November 2025 for up to 1,000 trucks in a framework agreement. |
| Rheinmetall MAN Military Vehicles; TG-Series | | Austria (production / assembly) Germany (design / production / group base) | Tactical trucks | Unspecified | N/A | N/A | — | 2026 - 2028 | Ordered in November 2025 for up to 1,000 trucks in a framework agreement. |
| KNDS Deutschland; Leguan Tatra Phoenix 10x10 | (Illustration) | Germany (Group based in the Netherlands) | Armoured vehicle-launched bridge | 3 (+ 3 in option) | N/A | N/A | — | — | Ordered in December 2025 (€33 million). |
| CEFA Zone Demining System (SDZ) | | France | Mine flail robot | Unknown | N/A | N/A | N/A | 2028 | Ordered in July 2026. |

==== Air defence ====
| Model | Image | Origin (designed / made in) | Type | Quantity | Armaments | Calibre | Phase in year | Notes |
|---|---|---|---|---|---|---|---|---|
| Weibel XENTA-M5 | | Denmark | Short range air-surveillance radar (drone shield) | — | — | — | 2027-2028 | Orders: December 2025; September 2026; Radar ordered for the V/SHORAD brigades. To be equipped on containers and transported on RMMV HX trucks. |
| Rheinmetall; Skyranger 30 | | Switzerland (Group based in Germany) | V/SHORAD | 16 | Oerlikon KCE with AHEAD rounds Mistral missiles | 30×173 mm | Initial prototype delivery in 2026 Full delivery 2027–2028. | Selected in 2023. To be mounted on the Piranha V chassis. The Terma BMD-Flex system is to be integrated by Terma. |
| MBDA; Mistral-3 | | France | SHORAD | Multiple hundreds, exact number not specified | — | 90mm | TBA | Purchased through the Danish military's acceleration fund in conjunction with 9 other EU nations. Whether the missiles are to be used standalone or solely as part of the Skyranger 30 system is unknown. |

==== Miscellaneous equipment ====
| Model | Image | Origin (designed / made in) | Type | Quantity | Phase in year | Notes |
|---|---|---|---|---|---|---|
| MULTITELT; T54V is 6×9 meters T36V is 6×6 meters T18V is 6×3 meters | | Denmark | Military tents | — | 2027-2028 | Acquired for both the Army and the Emergency Management Agency. Primarily used by the Engineer Regiment in connection with camp construction, including for offices, accommodation and sanitary services. Succeeds to the: M/2000; TENT; INFLATABLE |
| NATO Role 2 - Rheinmetall Role 2 Enhanced | | Germany | Field hospital | 2 | 2026-2027 | |
| NATO Role 2 - Rheinmetall Role 2 Basic | | Germany | Field hospital | 3 | 2026-2027 | |

== See also ==
- Forsvaret
- List of Danish military equipment of World War II
- List of active Royal Danish Navy ships
- Royal Danish Air Force
- Ranks and insignia of Royal Danish Army
