= Michael Belkin =

Michael Belkin may refer to:

- Mike Belkin (born 1945), Canadian tennis player
- Michael Belkin (ophthalmologist), Israeli academic and researcher
