= Saul Merin =

Israeli ophthalmologist

- שאול מרין
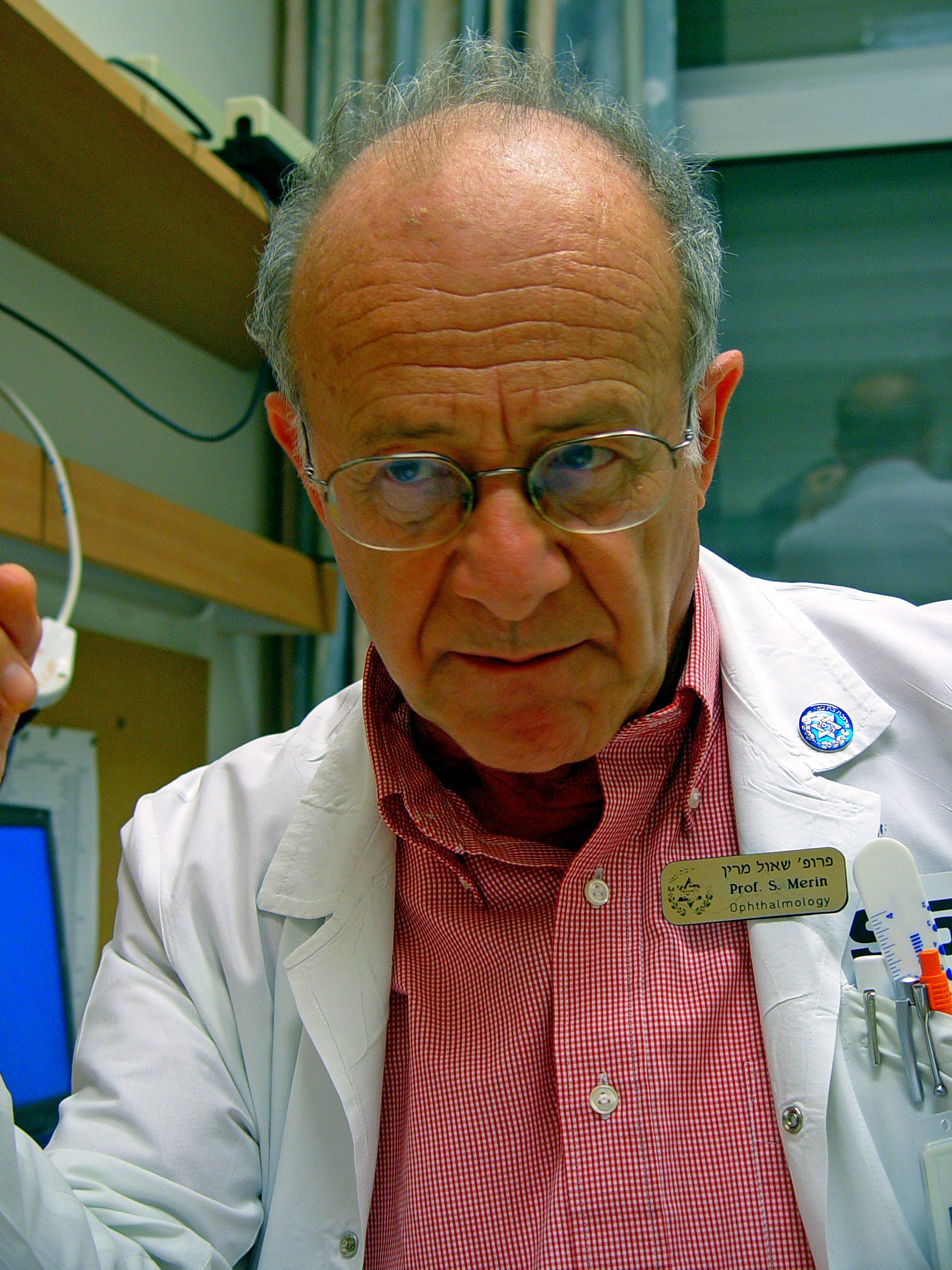
- Saul Merin (Jerusalem, 2004)
- Born: August 25, 1933; Poland
- Died: August 28, 2012 (aged 79); Jerusalem, Israel
- Education: Hebrew University of Jerusalem
- Occupation: Ophthalmologist
- Known for: Diagnosis and treatment of retinal and genetic eye diseases
- Title: Professor of Ophthalmology

Saul Merin (Hebrew: שאול מרין; August 25, 1933 – August 28, 2012) was an Israeli ophthalmologist specializing in the diagnosis and treatment of retinal and genetic eye diseases.

== Biography ==
Saul Merin was born in Poland. He escaped deportation by train to Auschwitz on August 3, 1943, and was hidden by Aniela (Zawadzka) Szwajce in Będzin, a town in southwest Poland, until arrival of the Soviet army in January 1945. He immigrated to Israel in 1949.

In 1953-1960, he studied medicine at the Hebrew University in Jerusalem. After serving in the Israel Defense Forces from 1961 to 1963, he trained in ophthalmology at Hadassah Medical Center under Professor I.C. Michaelson in 1963–1969. For two years, 1965-1967, he worked in Malawi and made several professional trips to Africa.

== Medical and academic career ==
Merin was a professor of ophthalmology at Hadassah Hospital. He also worked at the St John Eye Hospital Group's East Jerusalem hospital together with Arab ophthalmologists. He was a visiting professor at The University of Illinois Eye and Ear Infirmary for 25 years.

He did additional training at the Hospital for Sick Children, Toronto, Ontario, Canada in pediatric ophthalmology, and at the University of Illinois at Chicago, Illinois, USA for further study of the retina.

He was Professor of Ophthalmology at Hebrew University from 1979 until his death. He was Chairman of the Israel Ophthalmological Society from 1976 to 1982, Chairman of the Israel Society for Vision and Eye Research from 1985 to 1995, Chairman of the Israel Board of Ophthalmology from 1989 to 1995, and Chairman of the Unit of Ophthalmology at Hadassah Hospital on Mount Scopus from 1979 to 1998.

== Published works ==
- Merin, Saul (2005). Inherited Eye Diseases: Diagnosis and Management, Second Edition. New York: Dekker. ISBN 978-1-57444-839-9.
- Merin S; Obolensky A; Farber MD; Chowers I (February 2008). "A pilot study of topical treatment with an alpha2-agonist in patients with retinal dystrophies". J Ocul Pharmacol Ther. 24 (1): 80–6. doi:10.1089/jop.2007.0022. PMID 18201138.
- Blumenthal EZ; Papamichael G; Merin S (1998). "Combined hamartoma of the retina and retinal pigment epithelium: a bilateral presentation". Retina (Philadelphia, Pa.). 18 (6): 557–9. doi:10.1097/00006982-199806000-00013. PMID 9869468.
- Merin S; Blair NP; Tso MO (April 1987). "Vitreous fluorophotometry in patients with senile macular degeneration". Invest. Ophthalmol. Vis. Sci. 28 (4): 756–9. PMID 2435672.
- Merin S (1982). "Cataract formation in retinitis pigmentosa". Birth Defects Orig. Artic. Ser. 18 (6): 187–91. PMID 7171754.
- Ticho U; Ivry M; Merin S (March 1980). "Brittle cornea, blue sclera, and red hair syndrome (the brittle cornea syndrome)". Br J Ophthalmol. 64 (3): 175–7. doi:10.1136/bjo.64.3.175. PMC 1039382. PMID 7387950.
- Merin S; Auerbach E (1976). "Retinitis pigmentosa". Surv Ophthalmol. 20 (5): 303–46. doi:10.1016/S0039-6257(96)90001-6. PMID 817406.
- Merin S; Yanko L; Ivry M (February 1974). "Treatment of diabetic maculopathy by argon-laser". Br J Ophthalmol. 58 (2): 85–91. doi:10.1136/bjo.58.2.85. PMC 1017315. PMID 4856580.
- Merin S; Crawford JS (July 1971). "The etiology of congenital cataracts. A survey of 386 cases". Can. J. Ophthalmol. 6 (3): 178–82. PMID 4254831.
- Merin S; Freund M (December 1968). "Retinopathy in severe anemia". Am. J. Ophthalmol. 66 (6): 1102–6. doi:10.1016/0002-9394(68)90818-0. PMID 5727647.

== See also ==
- Health in Israel

Preceded by Michael Belkin	Chairpersons of the Israel Society for Vision and Eye Research; 1986-1989	Succeeded by Shabtay Dikstein
