= Michael Hyldgaard =

Danish Chief of Defence

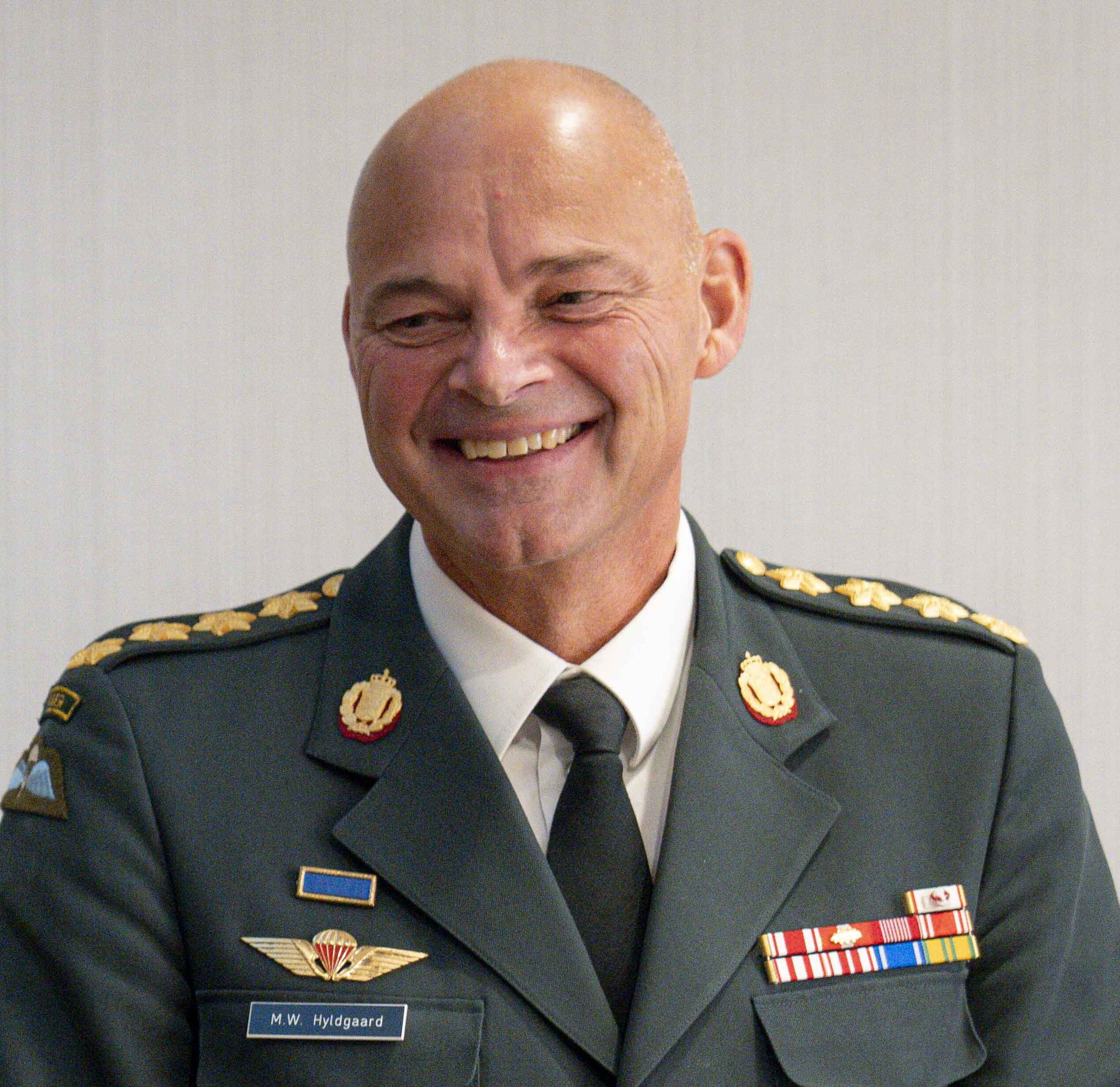
Hyldgaard in 2024.

Michael Wiggers Hyldgaard (born 18 July 1964) is a Danish general who has been the Chief of Defence since 1 June 2025. He served from 1983-1993 in the Zealand Life Regiment. In 1993 he was trained as a jaeger soldier. From 2007 to 2010 he was commander of the Jaeger Corps. Until his appointment, he was the Commander of the Special Operations Command since 1 July 2023. He was appointed acting Chief of Defence on 3 April 2024 after Flemming Lentfer was relieved of duty due to the fact that Deputy Prime Minister of Denmark and Minister for Defence Troels Lund Poulsen had lost confidence in him in the wake of the case of the Iver Huitfeldt-class frigate and the long-standing problems with the weapons systems onboard the frigate.

== Education ==
- Royal Danish Defence College (1999-2001)
- Danish Army Officers' College (1985-1988, 1991-1993)
- Danish Army Sergeants' School (1984-1984)
