= Ballistic eyewear =

Protective glasses or goggles

Ballistic eyewear is a form of glasses or goggles that protect from small projectiles and fragments. For the U.S. military, choices for such eye protection are listed on the Authorized Protective Eyewear List (APEL). Ballistic eyewear including examples that meet APEL requirements are commercially available for anyone who wishes to buy it. The history of protective eyewear goes back to 1880 and extends through to World War I and the present. There are three standards that are currently used to test the effectiveness of ballistic eyewear. These include a U.S. civilian standard (ANSI Z87.1 – 2010), a U.S. military standard (MIL-PRF-31013), and a European standard (EN 166, 169, 170 and 172).

== Types ==
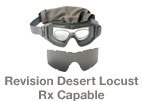
Example of ballistic eyewear that can be made with prescription lenses (from U.S. Army APEL list).

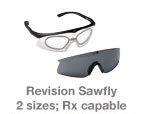
Another example of ballistic eyewear from the U.S. Army Approved Protective Eyewear List (APEL).

Safety glasses, sunglasses and goggles that claim to meet ballistic safety standards are widely available. Some can accommodate prescription lenses.

Although not required, it is recommended that all eyewear meet ANSI Z87.1, but for ballistic protective eyewear it is required that it meets military standards for impact protection (MIL-DTL-43511D clause 3.5.10 for goggles and visors and MIL-PRF31013 clause 3.5.1.1 for spectacles). Though these standards have been very commonly used especially by NATO forces, an update on MCEPS of January 2013 now reference these clauses in MIL-PRF-32432. Ballistic sunglasses or prescription eyeglasses must meet the same requirements. In brief, the U.S. military standard requires that ballistic eyewear must be able to withstand up to a 3.8 mm (.15 caliber) projectile at 195 m/s (640 ft/s)) for spectacles and 5.6 mm (.22 caliber) projectile at 168–171 m/s (550–560 ft/s) for goggles. The European standard identifies four levels of impact protection.

Manufacturers offer a variety of styles and colors to meet different needs and preferences. Some make claims of superior side protection, comfort, anti-fog coatings, interchangeable lenses, transition lenses, etc. At least one product from more than a half dozen manufacturers are listed on the U.S. Army's Authorized Protective Eyewear List (APEL). Some options, including the Wiley X PT-1 and Talon as well as Revision's Sawfly and the Desert Locust Goggle can be obtained in prescription lenses that meet the ballistic protection standards.

In addition to impact requirements, the U.S. Army requires for its soldiers that ballistic eyewear be functional, reasonably comfortable, not faddish (i.e., no bright colors or distracting designs) and able to be disinfected.

== Users ==
Ballistic eyewear is commercially available for anyone who wishes to buy it. People who use ballistic eyewear include those who regularly use firearms or are involved in activities where their eyes or faces may be exposed to small fragments. This includes many people who work in manufacturing. Military personnel may be required to use ballistic eyewear especially when in combat. Hunters are also frequent users of ballistic eyewear because of the possibility of a ricochet or the recoil of the firearm that may result in injury. Law enforcement officers also use ballistic eyewear for confrontations.

== Performance standards ==
There are three standards currently used to test the effectiveness of ballistic eyewear. These include a U.S. civilian standard (ANSI Z87.1 – 2010), a U.S. military standard (MIL-PRF-31013), and a European standard (EN 166, 169, 170 and 172).

The U.S. civilian standard for protective eyewear was revised in 2010. The previous version from 2003 was organized by the type of protector. The Z87.1-2010 version is organized by the type of hazard such as droplet and splash, impact, optical radiation, dust, fine dust, and mist. Also, the 2003 version specified that protective products be marked as providing "Basic" or "High Impact" protection. In the Z87.1-2010 standard, there is no longer a distinction between levels of ballistic protection. Products are either non-impact or impact protectors. Products marked as impact protectors must pass all high-impact testing requirements and are marked as "Z87+". Non-impact protectors are those which do not pass all high-impact testing requirements and are therefore marked only with "Z87" (no "+" sign).

The U.S. military standard requires (at a minimum) that ballistic eyewear can always withstand a 0.15 caliber, 5.8 grain, T37 shaped projectile at a velocity of 640 to 660 feet per second (approximately 3.8 mm 0.376 g at a velocity of 195 – 201 m/s). For testing, the velocity of the projectile must be verified using sound or optical chronograph methods. The eyewear is put on an Alderson 50th percentile male headform. A 0.002 inch thick aluminum foil "witness sheet" is placed behind the area of impact. This sheet shows whether any small pieces penetrate or come off of the eyewear during the test. The eyewear being tested is hit one time straight on slightly toward the outside of the center of the lens. The eyewear fails the test if the aluminum foil witness sheet is punctured or if the eyewear is cracked.

In addition to ballistic performance, the U.S. military standard includes requirements for optical clarity, protection from UV rays, fit, chemical resistance, and environmental stability (properties won't be changed by exposure to a range of temperatures or levels of humidity).

The European EN 166 standard identifies four levels of ballistic protection. "Increased robustness" (marked S) can withstand a 22 mm steel ball weighing 43 g dropped onto the lens from a height of .38 meters (15 inches). "Low energy impact" (marked F) can withstand a 6mm steel ball weighing 0.86 g and traveling at least 45 m/s at the time of impact. "Medium energy impact" (marked B) must be able to protect from a 6 mm 0.86 g steel ball with an impact velocity of 120 m/s. "High energy impact" (marked A) must be able to protect from a 6 mm 0.86 g steel ball with an impact velocity of 190 m/s.

== History ==
The history of protective eyewear goes back to 1880, when P. Johnson invented eye protectors. Johnson's design used two layers of semi-opaque cloth. He had in mind that firemen, furnace-men and others exposed to intense light would use them to reduce the light intensity. They did not provide impact protection. As early as 1885, Arthur T. Fullicks bonded several pieces of glass together. It seems that another Englishman, John Crane Woods, had safety in mind when he patented the idea of bonding sheets of transparent cellulose nitrate, using Canadian balsam, between two sheets of glass. The product was unsuccessful due to expense, poor quality and lack of demand.

In 1910, Edouard Benedictus, a French chemist, obtained both French and British patents for the manufacturing of laminated safety glass. He obtained a US patent in 1914. Benedictus used gelatin and other adhesives instead of Canadian balsam in the laminated glass. During World War I, laminated glass was used to make small, round lenses in gas masks and for windshields in military motor vehicles and aircraft. (For a number of recent years, the DuPont chemical company gave a Benedictus Award for the innovative use of laminated glass in architecture.) In the 1940s, manufacturers figured out how to sand and make safety glasses and goggles for welders, construction workers, and the like.

In the early 1960s the U.S. government sponsored experiments testing the ballistic performance of various plastics and glass for potential use in eyewear, using tests similar to those required by today's U.S. military standard. After this time, polycarbonate became the standard material used for ballistic eyewear. Investigations since this early work have included examining the effects of manufacturing and layering techniques on the ballistic performance of polycarbonates.

In the early 1970s, Wigglesworth investigated the ballistic resistance of 3 mm. and 2 mm. thicknesses of allyl resin and tempered glass as a function of the diameter of a small steel ball, impact velocity, and curvature of the lens.

In 1996, Belkin described new ballistic eyewear that also provided improved protection from injuries caused by laser light reaching the eyes.

Research into improved protection of the eyes from ballistic threats has continued. For example, Kelly presented work investigating layered materials to provide protection from 9 mm automatic gunfire, a much greater level of ballistic protection than previously available. While they demonstrated a successful concept, they recognized that advances in manufacturability were still needed for such protective eyewear to be affordable and plentiful.

In 2006 Hartley et al. were awarded a US Patent for Eyewear for ballistic and light protection. The invention was not for new protective materials but for a system that would allow the easier interchange of lenses between various types of protective devices, such as glasses, goggles and face shields.
