= Jørgen Lyng =

Danish Army general (born 1934)

Jørgen Lyng S.K.
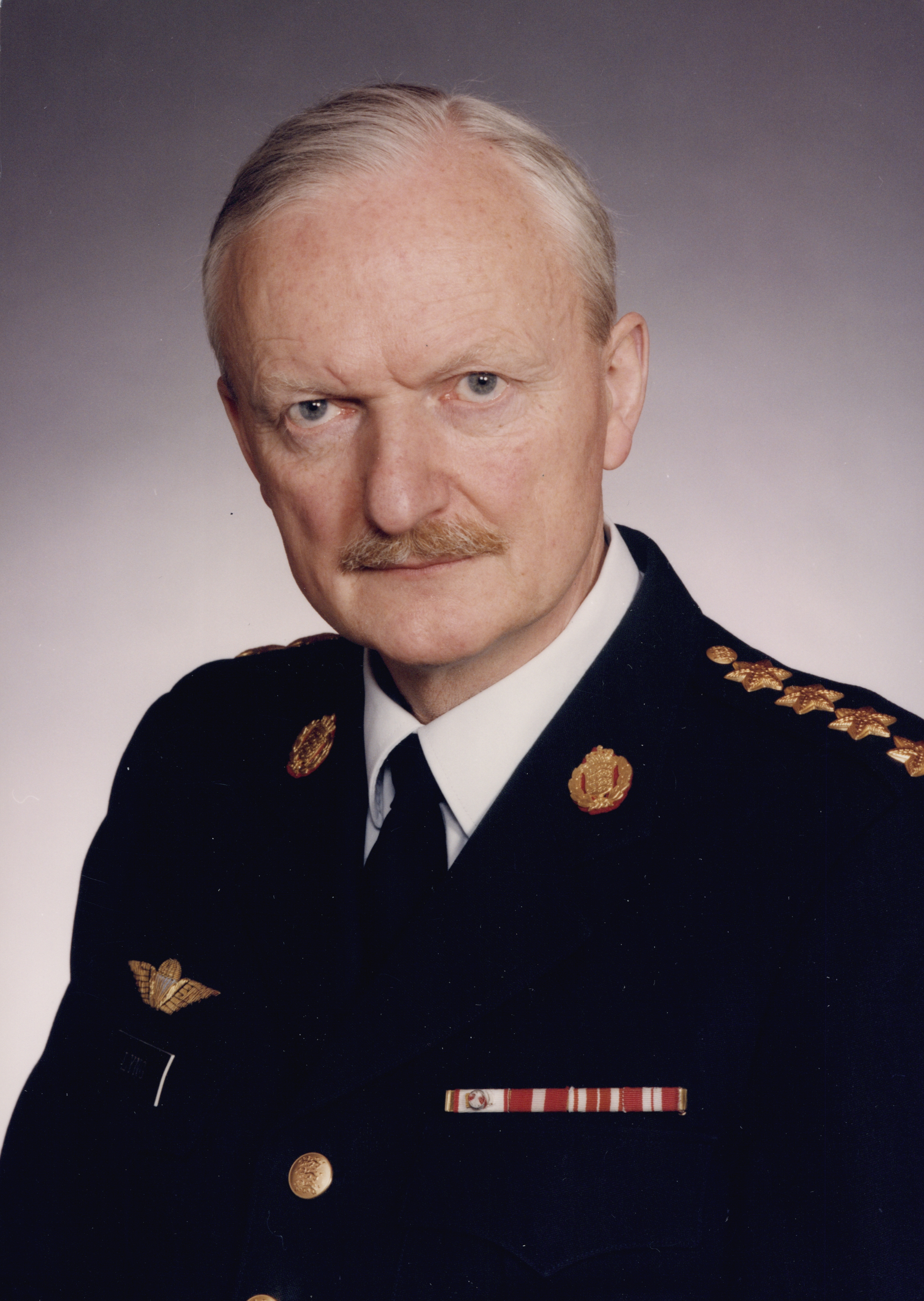
- Born: 7 March 1934 (age 92); Aalborg, Denmark
- Military career
- Allegiance: Denmark
- Branch: Royal Danish Army
- Rank: General
- Service number: Jæger 2
- Commands: Chief of Defence (1989–96)

Jørgen Lyng (born 7 March 1934), is a retired Danish general and a former Chief of Defence of Denmark.

As a young soldier Lyng received training from SAS, this training among other, enabled him to help establish and complete training for Jægerkorpset.

He was made Chief of Defence in 1989, only a week before the fall of the Berlin Wall. In 1990, he ordered HDMS Olfert Fischer to the Persian Gulf, in order to participate in the First Gulf War, thereby starting Denmark's more active foreign policy. This led to the creation of the Danish International Brigade in 1993 and participation in the NATO led in Bosnia and Herzegovina, where the Operation Bøllebank became the first combat operation conducted by Danish Armed Forces since World War II.

Since his retirement, Lyng received criticism for failing to cut spending of the Danish forces after the fall and the USSR, likewise his retirement party received criticism for its frivolous spending, which featured gun salutes from the navy, overhead flights by the Air Force, and entertainment by the Guard Hussar Regiment Mounted Squadron for the 600 party guests.

== Awards and decorations ==
Grand Cross of the Order of the Dannebrog
25 Years of Good Service
Badge of Honor of the Reserve Officers Association of Denmark
Badge of Honor of the Society of Danish Military Athletics

Other Accoutrements
Parachutist Badge
Jægerkorpset tab

Military offices
Preceded by Sven Eigil Thiede	Chief of Defence (Denmark); 1989-1996	Succeeded by Hans Jørgen Garde
