= Jørgen Garde =

Danish Royal Navy admiral (1939–1996)

Hans Jørgen Garde
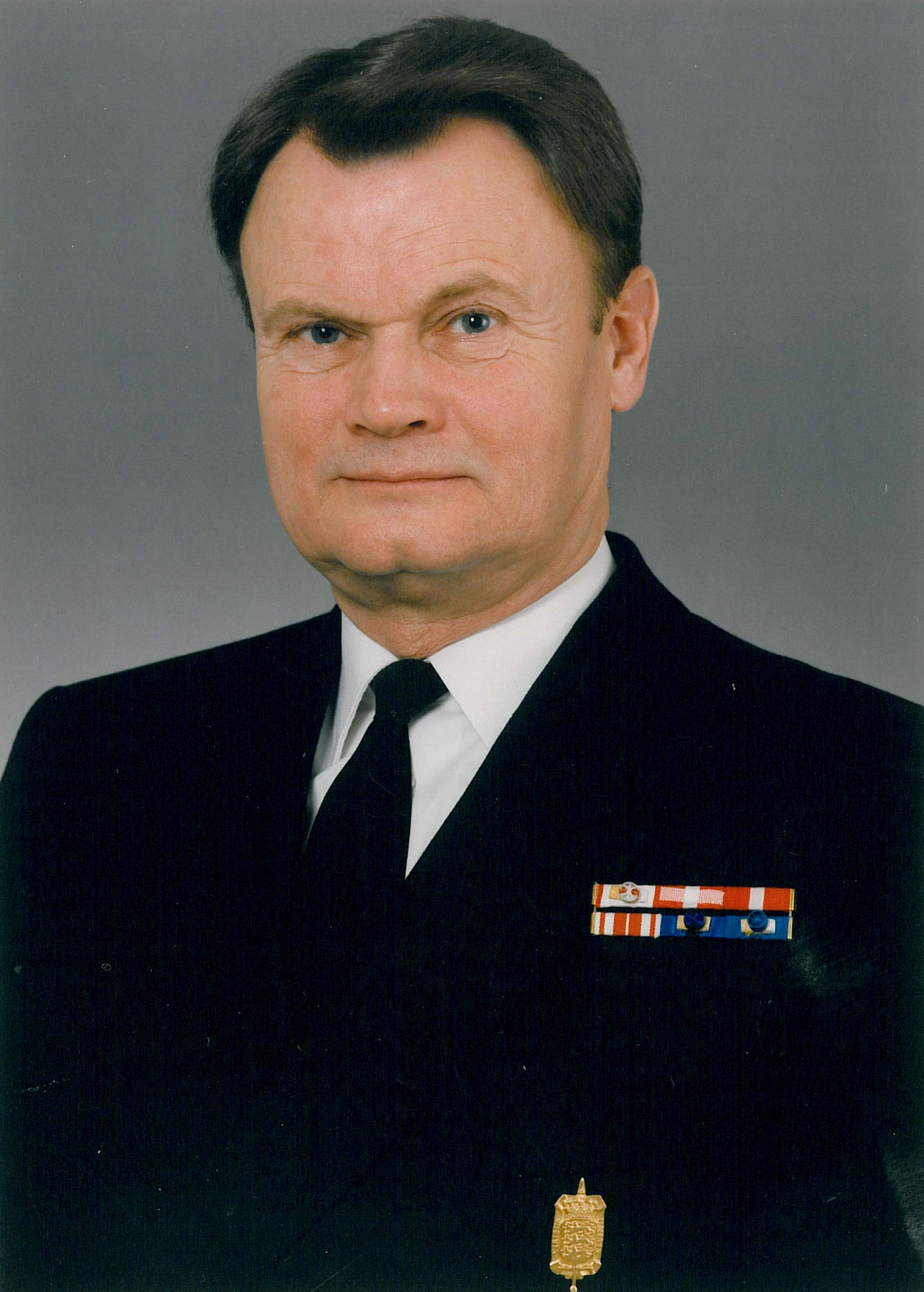
- Born: 22 January 1939; Frederiksberg, Denmark
- Died: 3 August 1996 (aged 57) Vágar, Faroe Islands
- Allegiance: Denmark
- Service years: 1960–1996
- Rank: Admiral

Hans Jørgen Garde (22 January 1939 in Frederiksberg – 3 August 1996 on Vágar, Faroe Islands) was a Danish admiral.

Garde was the Danish Chief of Defence from 1 April 1996 until his death. Garde died when the Gulfstream III he was travelling in with his wife, Anna Garde, crashed during final approach to Vágar Airport in bad weather and poor visibility. He was the first foreigner to be awarded the gold medal of the United States Naval Institute.

== Awards and decorations ==
Commander 1. class of the Order of Dannebrog
Medal of Merit
25 Years of Good Service
Badge of Honor of the Reserve Officers Association of Denmark
Grand Officer of National Order of Merit, (France)

== See also ==
- Vágar Airport:Accidents and incidents

Military offices
Preceded by Jørgen Lyng	Chief of Defence; 1 April 1996 — 3 August 1996†	Succeeded by Christian Hvidt
