= Authorized Protective Eyewear List =

List of protective eyewear tested and approved by the U.S. military

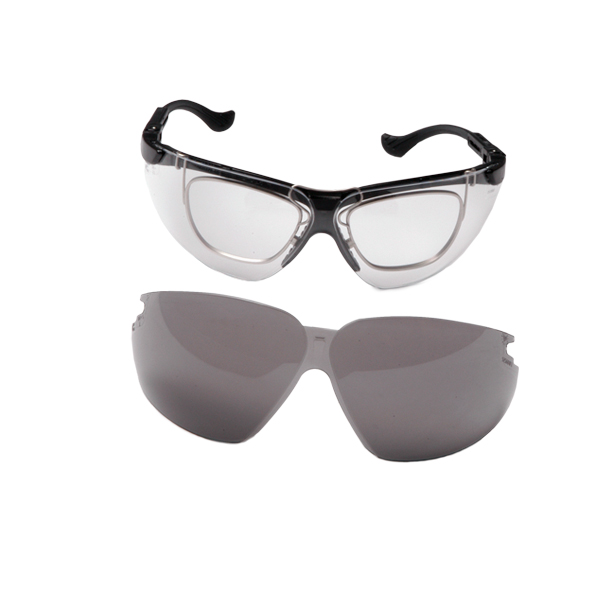
Authorized Protective Eyewear List (APEL) approved ballistic eyewear

The Authorized Protective Eyewear List (APEL) is a list of protective eyewear tested and approved by the U.S. Military for use by its soldiers. The APEL includes spectacles and goggles optimized for different situations.

== History ==
The APEL was created in 2006 because statistics showed that about 10% of battlefield injuries at that time included eye injuries. The APEL is updated periodically; it usually contains more than a dozen types of non-prescription and prescription spectacles and goggles for different duty situations and soldier preferences. In 2010, the APEL was placed under the oversight of the Military Combat Eyewear Protection (MCEP) program under the office of PEO Soldier.

== Styles ==
The APEL also includes different styles to accommodate soldier preferences, with the goal of increasing the use of eye protection. Approved protective eyewear includes both military standard and commercial styles. Soldiers serve in different situations with different types of risk for eye injury, from ballistic projectiles. Some styles can accommodate prescription lenses. Several types of goggles are available because they are optimized for certain purposes, such as regular use, use in vehicles, or use with night vision goggles. Some fit over regular eyeglasses, some can accommodate prescription lenses, and others are designed for those who do not wear eyeglasses.

== Performance ==
Eyewear on the APEL must meet the standards established by the Army Vision Conservation and Readiness Program. For ballistic resistance, this program requires that eyewear meet the current ANSI Z87 civilian standard. Then the U.S. military standard (MIL-PRF-31013) must also be met.

The U.S. civilian standard for protective eyewear was revised in 2010. The previous version from 2003 was organized by the type of protector. The Z87.1-2010 version is organized by the type of hazard such as droplet and splash, impact, optical radiation, dust, fine dust, and mist. Also, the 2003 version specified that protective products be marked as providing “Basic” or “High Impact” protection. In the Z87.1-2010 standard, there is no longer a distinction between levels of ballistic protection. Products are either non-impact or impact protectors. Products marked as impact protectors must pass all high-impact testing requirements and are marked as “Z87+”. Non-impact protectors are those which do not pass all high-impact testing requirements and are therefore marked only with “Z87” (no “+” sign).

The U.S. military standard (MIL-PRF-31013), requires (at a minimum) that ballistic eyewear can always withstand a 0.15 caliber, 5.8 grain, T37 shaped projectile at a velocity of 640 to 660 feet per second (approximately 3.8 mm 0.376 g at a velocity of 195 – 201 m/s). Goggles are required to stop a 17-grain fragment simulating projectile moving at a speed of 550 feet per second (approximately twice the energy impact of spectacles). For testing, the velocity of the projectile must be verified using sound or optical chronograph methods. The eyewear is put on an Alderson 50th percentile male headform. A 0.002 inch thick aluminum foil “witness sheet” is placed behind the area of impact. This sheet shows whether any small pieces penetrate or come off of the eyewear during the test. The eyewear being tested is hit one time straight on slightly toward the outside of the center of the lens. The eyewear fails the test if the aluminum foil witness sheet is punctured or if the eyewear is cracked.

In addition to ballistic performance, the U.S. military standard includes requirements for optical clarity, protection from UV rays, fit, chemical resistance, and environmental stability (properties won’t be changed by exposure to a range of temperatures or levels of humidity). Though soldiers are increasingly exposed to explosive threats, there is currently no testing or performance requirements for blast resistance of approved eyewear.
