= B. S. Christiansen =

Danish television personality (born 1952)

Bjarne Slot Christiansen
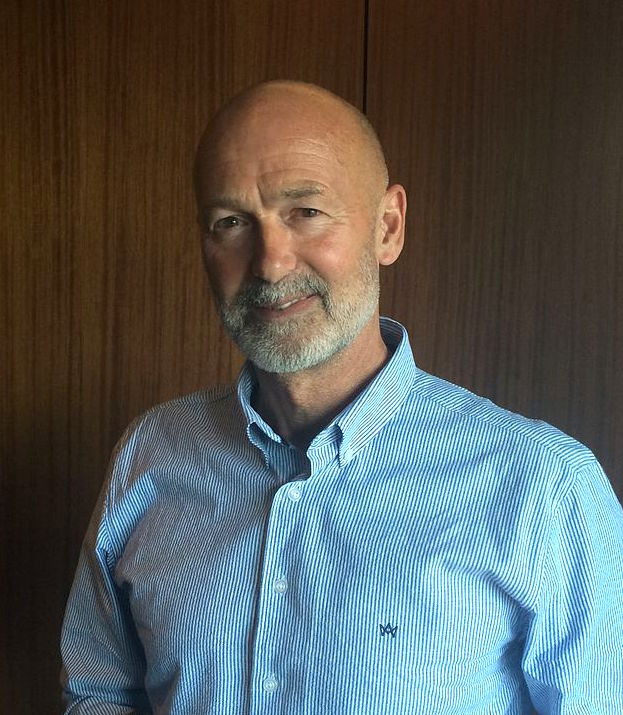
- B.S. in 2014
- Born: 27 September 1952 (age 74); Herning, Denmark
- Military career
- Allegiance: Denmark
- Branch: Royal Danish Army
- Service years: 1973 − 2001
- Nickname: B.S.
- Other work: Lifestyle Coach, TV host
- Website: Official home page

Bjarne Slot Christiansen (mostly known as B. S. Christiansen) (born September 27, 1952) is a former professional soldier from the Danish special force army unit Jægerkorpset, who is currently working with coaching and team building. His many television appearances and a popular book called Et liv på kanten (A Life on the Edge) have made him a celebrity in his home country.

B.S. Christiansen is one of the few Danes who have completed the American Ranger course, he completed with his buddy Carsten Mørch who was "Distinguished Honor Graduate" Ranger School class '78.

Among his most well known clients used to be the professional road bicycle racing team, Team Saxo Bank, for whom he organized a non-traditional training camp every year. Rather than focusing on bicycle racing, the camp focuses on team building.

== Awards and decorations ==
Other Accoutrements
Freefall Parachutist Badge
Jægerkorpset tab
Dannebrogordenen
