= Rathsack =

Rathsack is a surname. Notable people with the surname include:

- Svend Rathsack (1885–1941), Danish sculptor
- Thomas Rathsack (born 1967), Danish soldier and author
