= Shimshon Belkin =

Israeli microbiologist (born 1951)

- שמשון בלקין
- Born: 17 July 1951 (age 75); Tel Aviv, Israel
- Education: The Hebrew University of Jerusalem
- Known for: Microbial life in extreme environments; whole-cell microbial biosensors
- Awards: The Donald Tucker Memorial Oceanography Fellowship (1977); Danish Ministry of Education grant (1977); EMBO fellowships (1977, 1979); Lady Davis Fellowship (1983); Chaim Weizmann fellowship (1985); The David and Pola Ben Gurion Prize (1988); The DuPont Company Excellence prize (1994); The Strage-BGU prize for Excellence in Environmental Sciences (2019).
- Scientific career
- Fields: Environmental microbiology; biosensors
- Website: https://shimshonbelkinslab.wixsite.com/home

Shimshon Belkin (Hebrew: שמשון בלקין; born July 17, 1951) is an environmental microbiologist, a professor emeritus at the Department of Plant and Environmental Sciences at the Alexander Silberman Institute of Life Sciences of the Hebrew University of Jerusalem.

== Biography ==
Following an undergraduate degree in biology and a PhD in oceanography (1983, Prof. Etana Padan, supervisor), both at the Hebrew University of Jerusalem, Belkin was a postdoctoral fellow with Prof. Holger Jannasch at the Woods Hole Oceanographic Institution (Woods Hole, MA; 1983–1984) and with Prof. Lester Packer at the University of California, Berkeley (1984–1986). From 1986 to 1996 he was a faculty member at the J. Blaustein Institute for Desert Research of the Ben Gurion University of the Negev, Israel. In 1993-95 he was a visiting scientist at Robert A. LaRossa's group at Dupont Central Research and Development (Wilmington, Delaware). He returned to the Hebrew University in 1996, first as an associate professor at the School of Applied Science (1996–2004) and later as a full professor at the Alexander Silberman Institute of Life Sciences (2004–2021). He is now a Prof. Emeritus of Environmental Microbiology at the latter institute. Since 2011 he is the incumbent of the Ministry of Labor & Social Welfare Chair in Industrial Hygiene.

=== Selected Hebrew University positions ===
- Head of the Department of Environmental Sciences, School of Applied Science (2000–2003);
- Director, Environmental Sciences program at the Faculty of Natural Sciences (2000–2003),
- Director, Technology Management program (2000–2006; Joint program of the Faculty of Natural Sciences and the Hebrew University Business School);
- Head, Department of Plant and Environmental Sciences (2013–2015);
- Chair, the Inter-Faculty Biotechnology Program (2008–2014).

=== Selected ex-university activities ===
- Member of the committee for determination of Israeli water quality regulations (the “Adin Committee”, 2004–2007; chair, microbiology standards subcommittee);
- Chair, the Ministry of Health and Ministry of Environmental Protection joint committees for the determination of recreational water quality criteria (2006, 2012);
- Member, Advisory Committee on Water Quality to the Minister of Health (2014–2022; chair, microbiology sub-committee);
- President of the Israeli Society for Ecology and Environmental Sciences (1998–2000).

== Research ==
Prof. Belkin's research, from his student days to his current position, covers a broad range of topics, practically all of them at the interface between a study of microbiology and diverse environmental aspects. Since 1995, one of the main foci in his lab is the application of synthetic biology principles in the design, construction and testing of genetically engineered microorganisms as biosensors.

The molecular engineering of such live bioreporters usually involves a fusion of a sensing element (often a gene promoter induced in the presence of the target compounds) to reporter gene(s), the expression of which can be monitored quantitatively. This approach, applied by the Belkin group towards the development of different types of sensors for environmental applications, has also diverged into related aspects such the integration of live sensor cells into miniaturized hardware platforms, polymer cellular encapsulation for field dispersal, and the development of algorithms for deciphering cell array signals.

One of the main topics currently occupying the Belkin team is the development of an innovative system for the remote detection of buried landmines and other explosive devices. Landmines are not completely sealed, and traces of explosives escape out of the mine's casing and accumulate in the soil above it; bacterial sensor strains have been developed in the Belkin lab that sensitively respond to the presence of these traces by the generation of an optical signal, either fluorescence or bioluminescence. These signals can be imaged remotely; thus alleviating the highly risky need for the presence of personnel on the minefield.

Additional research topics investigated by Prof. Belkin and his team over the years include cyanobacterial bioenergetics and hydrogen production, microbiology of deep-sea hydrothermal vents (including several research dives in the submersible Alvin^{)}, and the characterization and treatment of industrial wastewaters.

Also worth mentioning is the study of the bacterial populations inhabiting the external surfaces of the salt-excreting Tamarix tree. This extreme environment is characterized by almost diurnal fluctuations between complete desiccation during the day, and a very high salinity (up to 4-fold higher than that of seawater) at night, when the salts excreted by the tree onto the leaves’ surface are dissolved by the prevalent dew.
