= Special Operations Command (Denmark) =

- Specialoperationskommandoen
- Active: 1 September 2014; 11 years ago
- Country: Kingdom of Denmark
- Branch: Danish Defence
- Type: Special operations
- Part of: Defence Command
- Headquarters: Aalborg Air Base
- Nickname: SOKOM
- Mottos: Styrke Gennem Fælles Indsats (Strength Through Joint Effort)

Commanders
- Chief of SOKOM: Major general Poul Ebstrup
- Chief of Jaeger Corps: Lieutenant colonel Jens P Blomqvist
- Chief of Frogman Corps: Commander-captain Flemming Haar

The Special Operations Command (Danish: Specialoperationskommandoen; SOKOM) is a command of the Danish Armed Forces and a part of the Defence Command. SOKOM was established in 2014 to bring the Jaeger Corps (Danish: Jægerkorpset) and the Frogman Corps (Danish: Frømandskorpset) under one command. It is based at Aalborg Air Base.

== Role ==
SOKOM was established on 1 September 2014 as part of the Danish Defence Agreement 2013-2017; Major General Jørgen Høll was appointed its first chief. SOKOM was created with the aim of "strengthening and increasing the future capabilities within special operations, including capabilities of the Air Force".

On 1 July 2015, the Jaeger Corps was transferred from the Royal Danish Army and the Frogman Corps from the Royal Danish Navy to SOKOM.

SOKOM is tasked with working with national and international partners, where SOKOM will be able to offer a special operations alternative to conventional military solutions and to be able to deploy a headquarters element to support special operations on foreign soil.

== Divisions ==
- Frogman Corps
- Jaeger Corps
- Sirius Dog Sled Patrol

== Commanding officer ==
No.	Portrait	Name (born–died)	Term of office			Ref.
No.	Portrait	Name (born–died)	Took office	Left office	Time in office	Ref.
1		Major general Jørgen Høll (born 1958)	1 September 2014	21 March 2018	3 years, 201 days	
2		Major general Peter Harling Boysen (born 1963)	21 March 2018	1 July 2023	5 years, 102 days	
3		Major general Michael Hyldgaard (born 1964)	1 July 2023	3 April 2024	277 days	
–		Colonel; Nicolaj Stahlfest Møller (born ?) acting	3 April 2024	1 August 2025	1 year, 120 days	
4		Major general Poul Ebstrup (born 1965)	1 August 2025	Incumbent	1 year, 21 days	

== See also ==
- United States Special Operations Command
- Special Forces Command (Sweden)
