= Jaeger Corps (Denmark) =

Elite military unit of the royal Danish army

- Jægerkorpset
- Unit insignia of Jægerkorpset
- Active: 1 November 1961 – present
- Country: Denmark
- Branch: Royal Danish Army
- Type: Special Operations Force
- Size: about 150
- Part of: Danish Special Operations Command
- Garrison/HQ: Aalborg Air Base
- Nicknames: JGK, The Jaegers, The Elite
- Mottos: Plus Esse Quam Simulatur (Rather to be, than to seem)
- Engagements: Cold War United Nations Protection Force; NATO intervention in Bosnia: Kosovo Force (KFOR); Stabilisation Force in Bosnia and Herzegovina (SFOR); Task Force K-Bar; Operation Anaconda; War in Afghanistan; Operation Panther's Claw; Iraq War; Operation Inherent Resolve
- Decorations: Presidential Unit Citation
- Website: Official Facebook

Commanders
- Chief of SOKOM: Major general Michael Wiggers Hyldgaard
- Chief of the Jaeger Corps: Lieutenant colonel Jens P Blomqvist

The Jaeger Corps also known as the Huntsmen Corps (Danish: Jægerkorpset, JGK) is an elite special operations force of the Danish Armed Forces part of Special Operations Command, formerly of the Royal Danish Army, based at Aalborg Air Base.

== History ==
The Jaeger Corps traces its origins to 1785 when the corps was first formed as the "Jaeger Corps of Zealand". Facing emerging threats from Sweden, Prussia, and Great Britain, Denmark created a light infantry force from hunters and woodsmen. The corps existed in various forms until it was remade in its current form in 1962 when Major P.B. Larsen and First Lieutenant Jørgen Lyng became the first two to complete the training.

Throughout the Cold War, the Jaegers' primary tasking was that of a long-range reconnaissance unit, with wide renown for their skills in parachute operations. In the post-Cold War era, the Jaegers deployed for the first time in 1995 to Sarajevo with a six-man counter-sniper team.

Following the September 11 terrorist attacks and the beginning of the United States invasion of Afghanistan in October 2001, the Jaegers' training programme changed. As such, the Jaegers increased their proficiency in counter-terrorism skills, while still maintaining their excellence at reconnaissance operations.

In 2002, the Jaegers were deployed to Afghanistan as part of the Danish contribution (Task Group Ferret) to Task Force K-Bar, along with the Frogman Corps. During these operations, the Jaegers took part in reconnaissance, observations, capturing of high-value targets, and direct-action raids on Taliban and al-Qaeda positions. As part of Task Force K-Bar, the Jaeger Corps was awarded the American Presidential Unit Citation on 7 December 2004 for its effort as part of the joint special operations task force in Afghanistan.

The first Jaeger to be killed in combat was in 2013 when a Jaeger was hit by an explosion in Afghanistan. Four Jaegers had previously died during training accidents.

== Selection and training ==
The selection course to become a Jaeger is very demanding, both mentally and physically. To be accepted into the Corps, a candidate must complete the following:

- Pre-course 1 (5 days)

Introduces the candidate to the subjects covered in the patrol course, and identifies the areas in which the candidate must improve (orienteering, swimming, etc.).

- Pre-course 2 (2 days)

More training and evaluation in the above covered subjects.

- Pre-course 3 (2 days)

More training and evaluation in the above covered subjects with tougher requirements.

- Patrol Course (8 weeks)

Basic medical, demolition, and marksmanship using basic direct-action and special reconnaissance training events to assess candidates. This course must be completed at a satisfactory level to continue to the aspirant course.

- Selection Course (8 weeks)

Candidates receive training in advanced breaching, close-quarters battle, demolition, and sniping. If passed the candidate is awarded his or her "bugle" for the beret.

- Basic parachuting course (2 weeks)
- Combat Swimming Course (2 weeks)

Approximately 10% of candidates successfully complete the program and become a full member of the Jaeger Corps. The successful Jaeger continues in the training wing for individual training during their first (probationary) year. During this time they will receive High Altitude Parachute Operations (HAPO) training in High Altitude Low Opening (HALO) and High Altitude High Opening (HAHO), environmental training (desert and winter), advanced infiltration training (mountain, nontactical vehicle, ski and rotary-wing), attain Joint Terminal Attack Controller (JTAC) certification, and gain additional communications skills. New Jaeger Corps members are also taught a hand-to-hand combat system called MTM (man-to-man) combat, which was developed in 1992 by Peter Hedegaard in collaboration with two of the Corps's own close-combat instructors.

== Insignia and status ==
The Jaeger Corps wear a frogberet also and the maroon beret with a brass emblem depicting a hunter's bugle on a black felt liner. After one year of satisfactory service and training in corps the wearer is issued the shoulder patch "JÆGER" and may call himself by this name. The unit's insignia features a hunting horn from their origin as hunters and woodsmen.

The Jaeger Corps is composed of around 150 highly trained soldiers with special expertise in counter-terrorism, demolitions, parachuting, and combat swimming, HAHO and HALO parachuting, infiltration, sabotage, reconnaissance and more. The corps regularly trains with similar units from different countries, such as the US Navy SEALs, US Army DELTA, British SAS and the Danish naval special forces group, the Frogman Corps. The corps is based on the structure and modus operandi of the British SAS.

Their slogan, which is Latin, Plus esse, quam simulatur translates to Hellere at være, end at synes ("Rather to be, than to seem") in Danish, meaning that the soldier's capabilities do not have to be widely recognized or boasted—they are only more effective if unknown.

== International Joint Training ==
Like most western Special Operations Forces, the Jaegers regularly take part in joint training operations with other NATO and Coalition SOFs. These exercises include reconnaissance patrols throughout Europe, arctic survival training, helicopter insertion techniques, parachute insertion techniques, hostage rescue training, Close Air Support training, medical training, and other SOF-specific skills.

Allied units as the Jaegers regularly train with include:

- US Army Special Forces
- US Navy SEALs
- US Army Delta Force
- 22nd Special Air Service Regiment
- Forsvarets Spesialkommando (FSK)
- Särskilda operationsgruppen
- Kommando Spezialkräfte
- Army Ranger Battalion
- Netherlands Special Operations Command
- Special Operations Regiment (Belgium)

== Well known jaegers ==
- Poul Kjeld Larsen: Jaeger Nr. 1 – Co-found and first CO of the Corps
- Jørgen Lyng: Jaeger Nr. 2 – Co-found and first XO of the Corps and later Chief of Defence
- Helge Adam Møller: Jaeger Nr. 157 – Danish politician for the Conservative and former MP
- Poul Dahl: Jaeger Nr. 160 – Author, Danish politician for Venstre and former MRC. Dahl served as CO of the Corps in start of the 1990's
- B. S. Christiansen: Jaeger Nr. 163 – Author, lecturer, coach and media personality.
- Carsten Mørch: Jaeger Nr. 173 – Author, lecturer and coach
- Lars Møller: Jaeger Nr. 200 – Author
- Lothar Friis: Jaeger nr. 215 - Expeditions leader in the tv show "Ingen kære mor" TV2.
- Thomas Rathsack: Jaeger Nr. 229 – Author, debater and media personality.
- Nicolai Moltke-Leth: Jaeger Nr. 243 – Author, lecturer, coach and expeditions leader in the tv show "56° Nord" Kanal 5
- Michael Hyldgaard: Jaeger Nr. ? CO of the Corps 2007-10 and Chief of Defence 2024-
- René Brink Jakobsen: Jaeger Nr. 353 – First (and only) Jaeger to be killed in combat.

== See also ==
- Special Support and Reconnaissance Company
