= Frogman Corps (Denmark) =

Danish maritime special operations unit

- Frømandskorpset
- Emblem of the Frogman Corps
- Active: 17 June 1957 – present
- Country: Denmark
- Branch: Royal Danish Navy
- Type: Frogman
- Role: Special operations Combat diving Special reconnaissance
- Size: 150
- Part of: Special Operations Command
- Garrison/HQ: Kongsøre
- Nicknames: FKP, Et hold af frøer
- Engagements: Operation Ocean Shield
- Decorations: Presidential Unit Citation (United States)
- Website: Official Facebook page

The Frogman Corps (Danish: Frømandskorpset) is the maritime special operations force of the Danish Armed Forces. On 1 July 2015, the Frogman Corps transferred from the Royal Danish Navy to the newly established Special Operations Command.

== History ==
The Frogman Corps was established on 17 June 1957 based on the model of the United Kingdom's Special Boat Service, US Underwater Demolition Team, and Marinejegerkommandoen in Norway. Initially it was under the Danish Navy's Diving School at Flådestation Holmen (Naval Station Holmen, Copenhagen), but in 1972 it was made an independent unit, operationally under the submarine squadron.

== Role ==
The Frogman Corps' primary role is reconnaissance, but it is also tasked with assaulting enemy ships, sabotage of fixed installations, advance force and maritime anti-terrorism tasks.

It also performs special operations work on land, including anti-terrorism and anti-criminal work. The Frogman Corps support the police with matters that demand highly specialised diving. Local authorities, etc. can also benefit from the frogmen's skills, for example when underwater installations must be inspected.

== Training ==
The Frogman Corps trains at the Torpedo Station at Kongsøre and works through a long series of courses, e.g.:

- Combat swimmer course for three weeks
- Advanced scuba diving course
- Rescue swimmer course
- Survival course

The basic Frogman Course is nine months. Each year 500–600 applicants start the course and less than a dozen complete all nine months. Since its creation in 1957, 311 have completed the training and become frogmen as of 2015.

King Frederik X of Denmark passed selection and completed continuation training to become a badged Frogman, in the course of which he earned the nickname "Pingo", when his drysuit filled with water and he was forced to waddle like a penguin.

In 2015, a DR-produced documentary detailing the life of Frogman cadets was released.

== Operations ==
The Frogman Corps were involved in operations in Afghanistan, such as Task Force K-Bar, and in Iraq.

From 2008 until the end of 2014, the Frogman Corps was involved in counter-piracy operations as part of Operation Ocean Shield. On 5 February 2010, ten Frogman Corps members aboard HDMS Absalon (L16) conducted a counter-piracy mission in the Gulf of Aden approaching the Antigua and Barbuda-flagged merchant vessel Ariella by rigid hull inflatable boat which had been hijacked by six armed Somali pirates. They scaled the side of the ship and freed the 25 crew, who had locked themselves in a secure room, and continued to search the vessel for the pirates who had fled.

In November 2021, a unit from the Frogman Corps was involved in counter-piracy operations in the Gulf of Guinea deployed aboard the Royal Danish Navy frigate HDMS Esbern Snare (F342). On 25 November 2021, soldiers from the unit were involved in a firefight with eight suspected pirates aboard a fast-moving craft where four suspects were killed and one wounded and the surviving three were captured. The soldiers suffered no casualties.

== Equipment ==
- SIG Sauer P320 X-Carry (replaced Glock Model 17 in service, when the military adopted the P320)
- Heckler & Koch MP5
- SIG MCX
- Gevær M/10 (Colt Canada C8 IUR rifle)
- Finskyttegevær M/04 (Sako TRG-42)
- GRK M/03 40 mm (Colt Canada M203A1)
- Dysekanon M/85 (Carl Gustav M3)
- Panserværnsvåben M/97 (AT-4 CS)

== Gallery ==
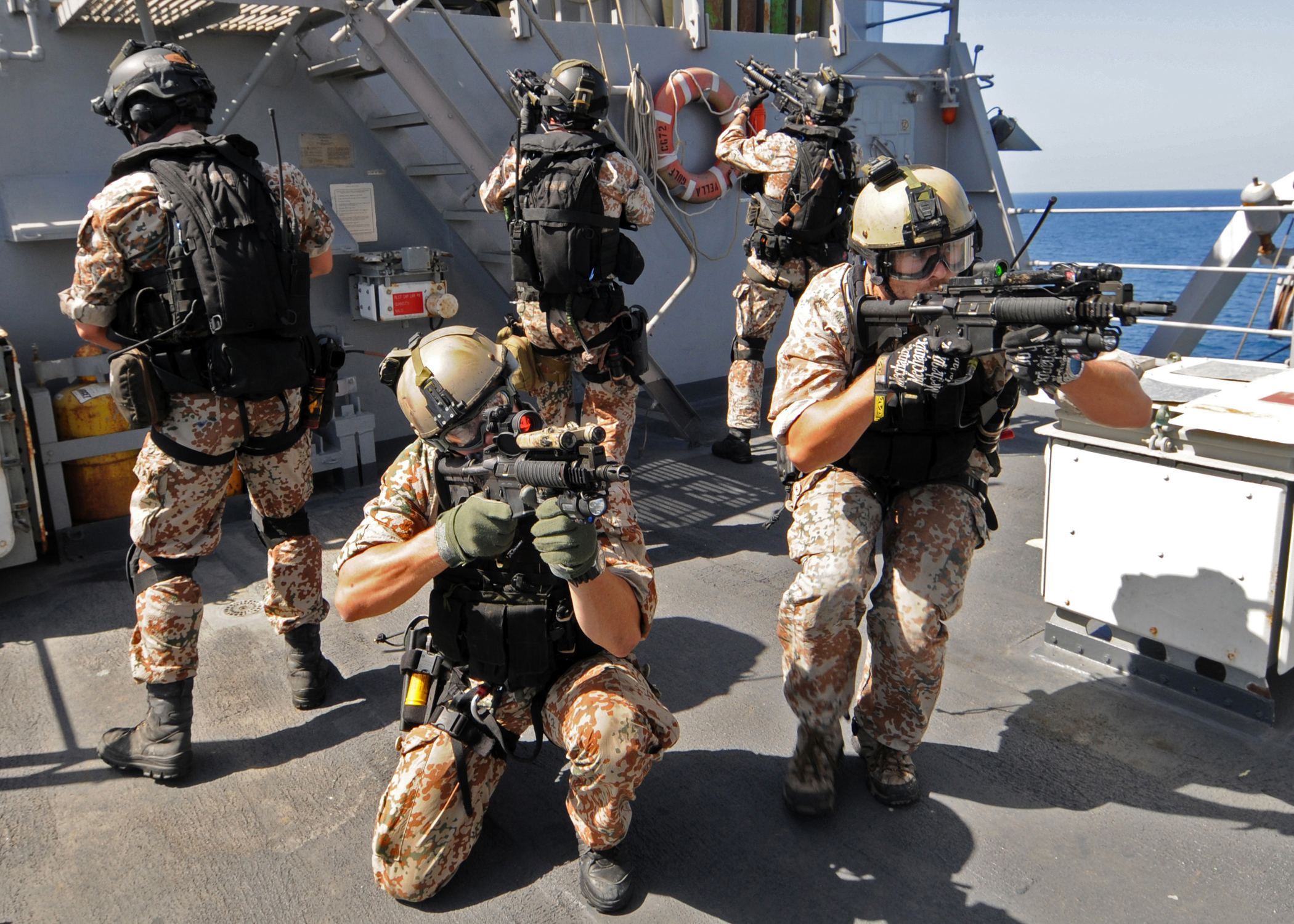

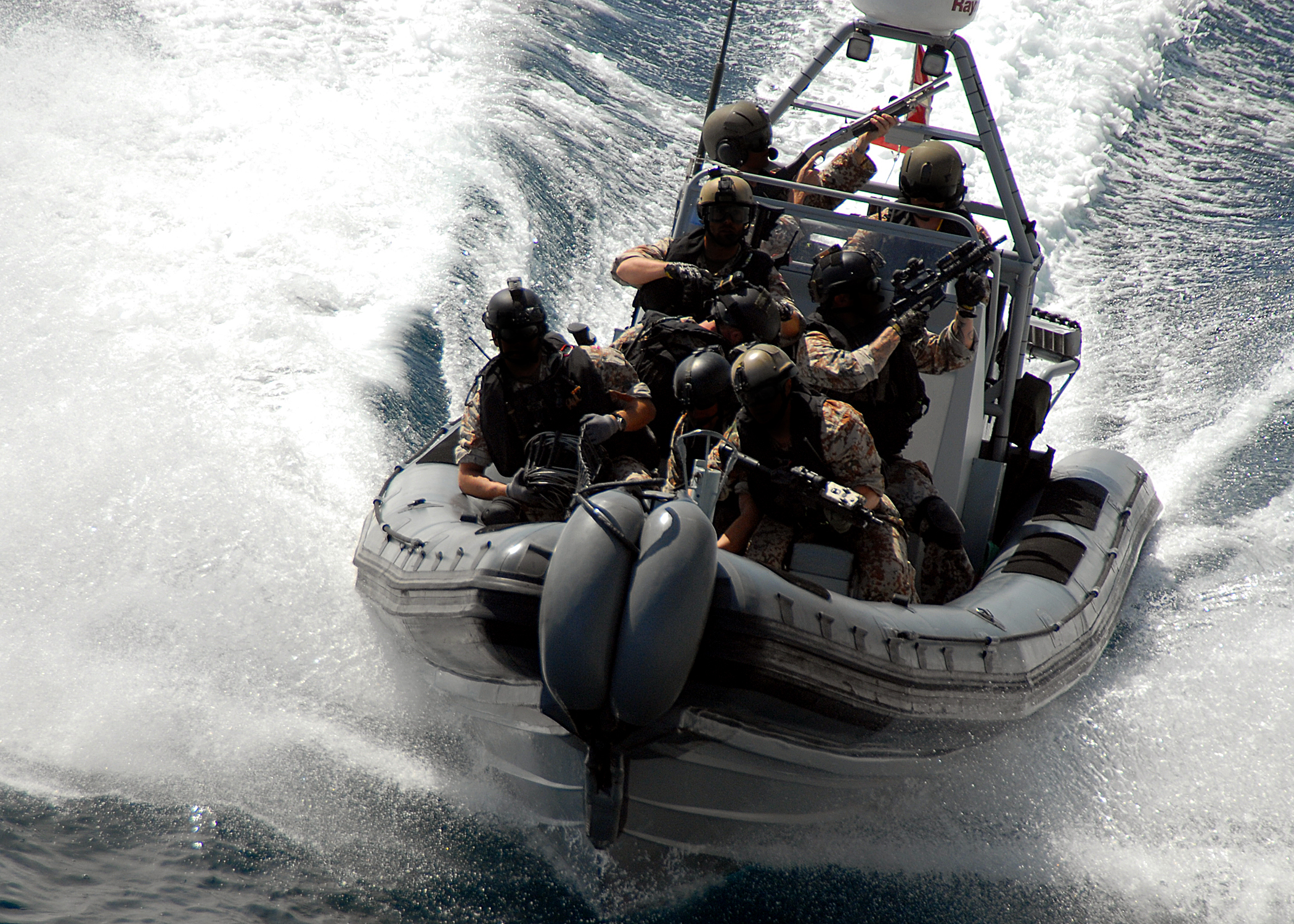

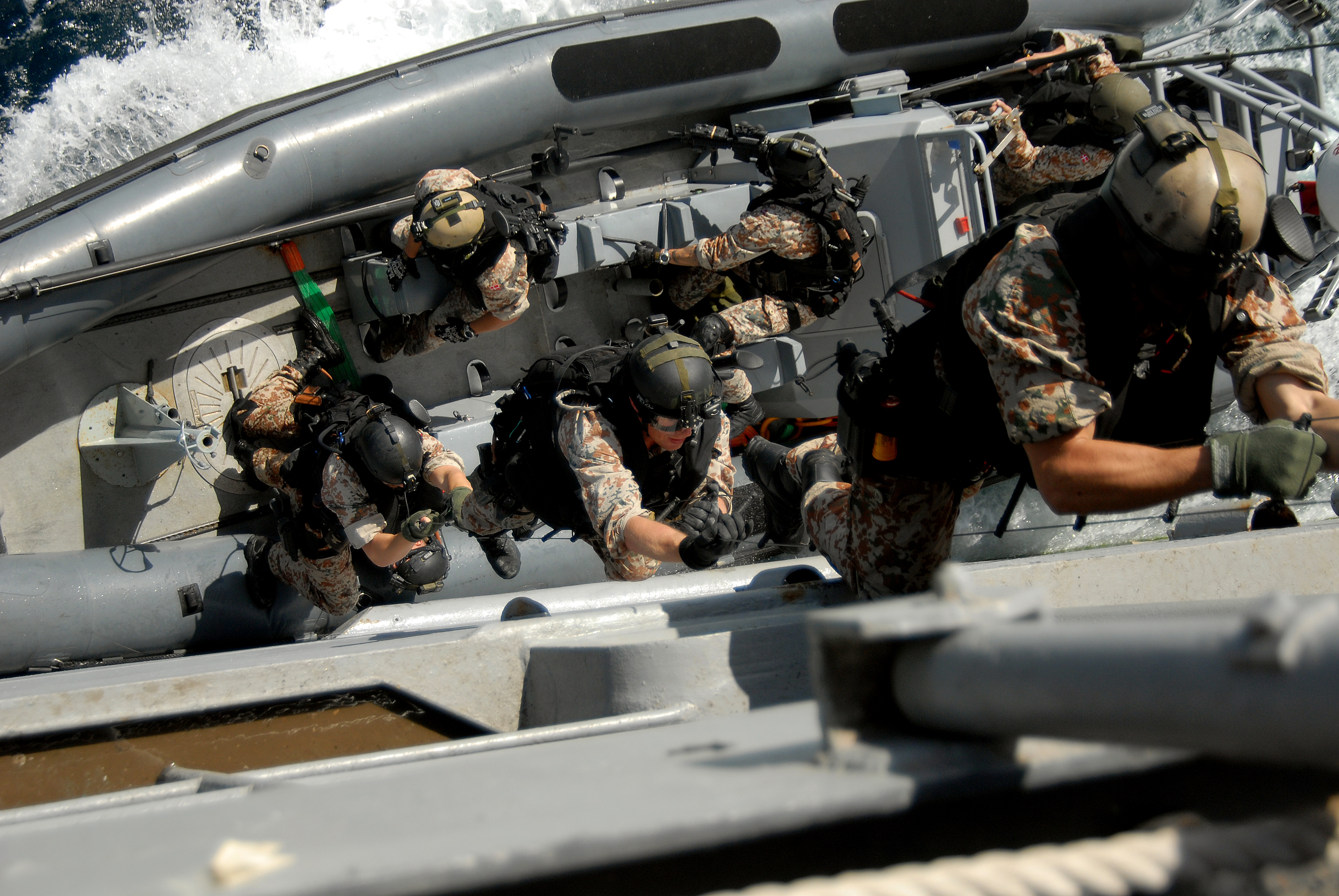

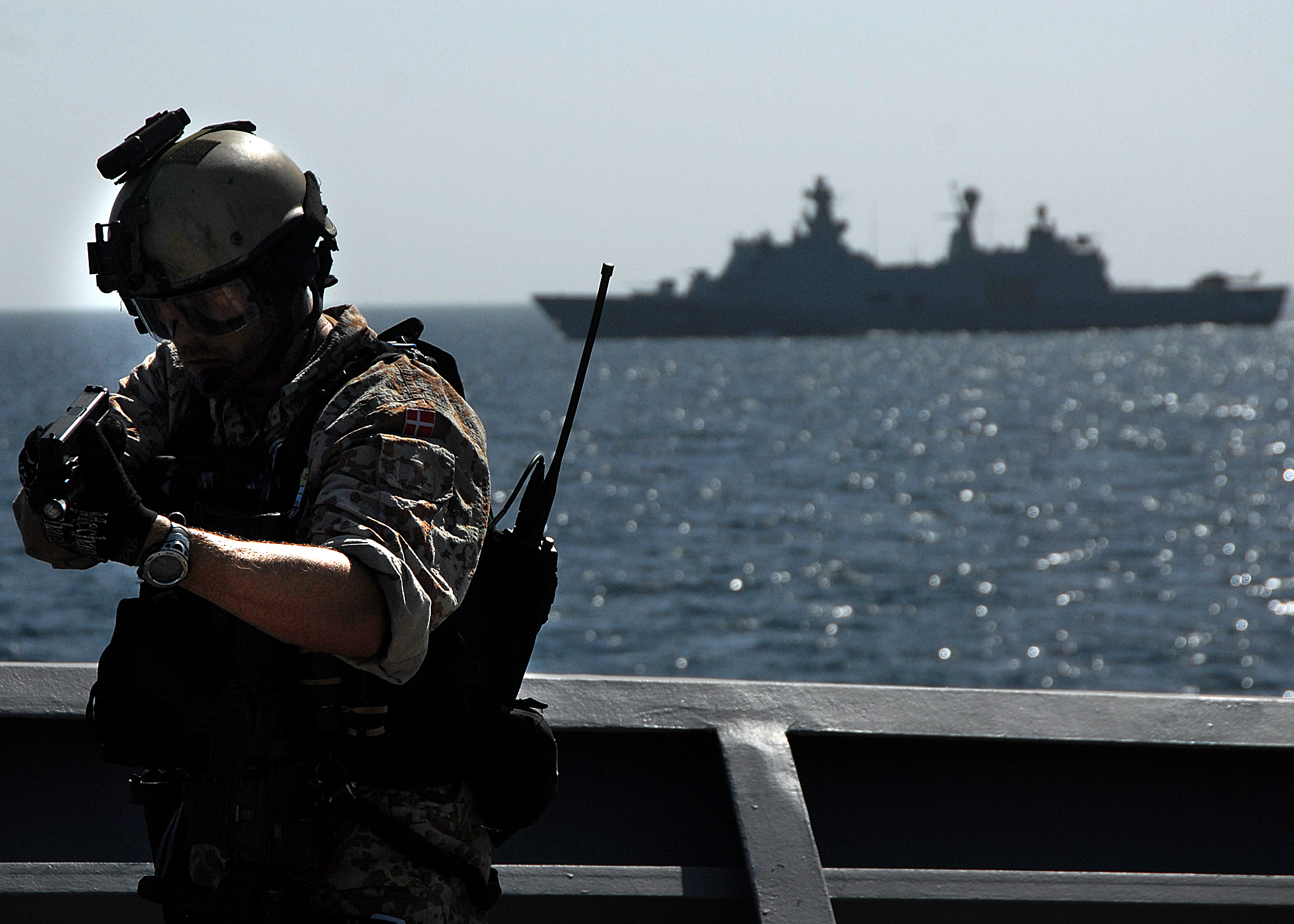

== See also ==
- List of military diving units (including special forces)
- List of military special forces units
