= Michael Belkin (ophthalmologist) =

Israeli ophthalmology professor

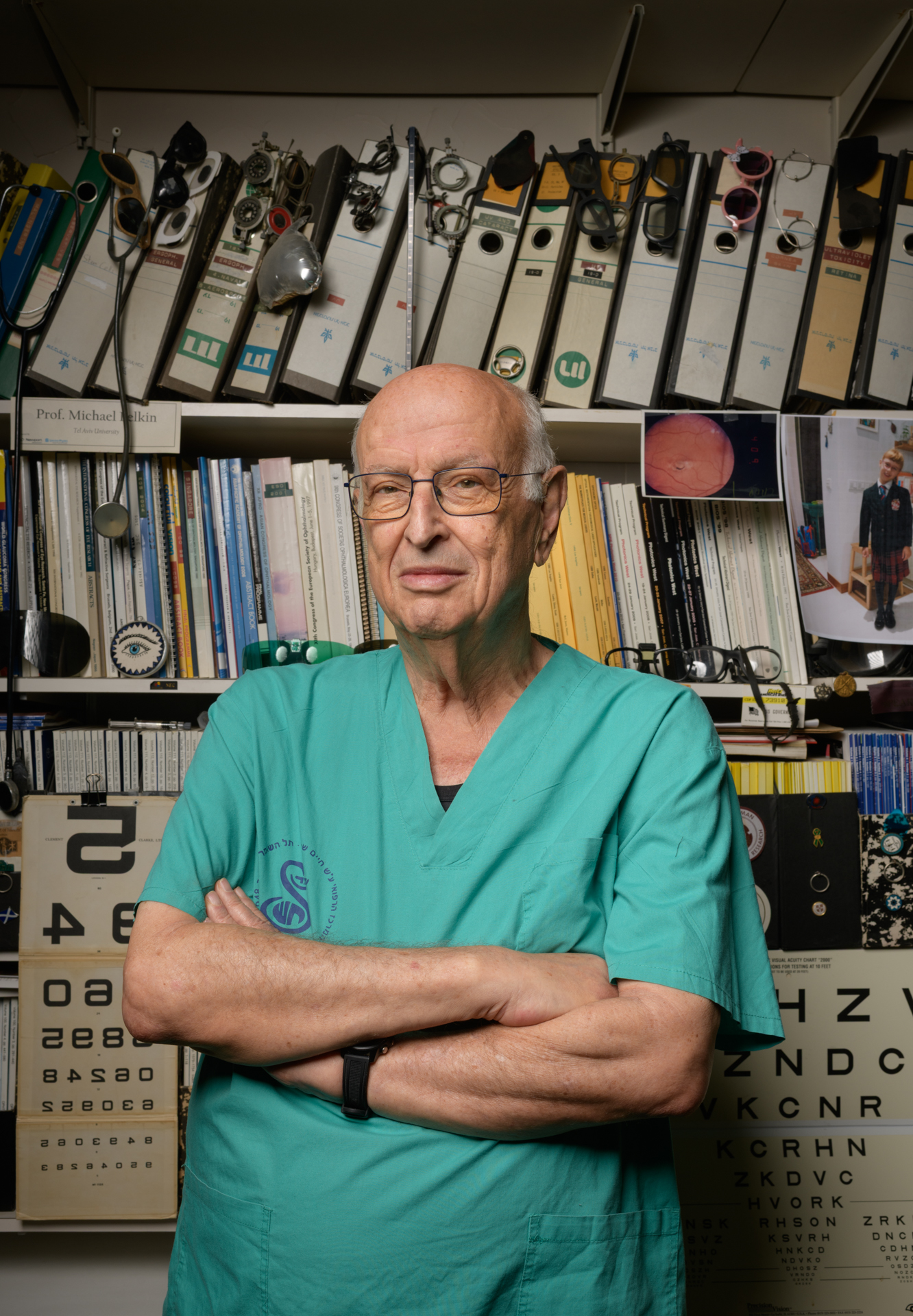
Prof Michael Belkin

Michael Belkin (Hebrew: מיכאל בלקין) is an Israeli academic researcher and inventor. He is a Professor Emeritus of Ophthalmology at Tel-Aviv University, listed in the Ophthalmologists Power List for 2023 and 2024.

His research and inventions brought about advances in treatment of eye diseases such as the ExPRESS glaucoma implant, Direct Selective Laser Trabeculoplasty (DSLT), an automatic, fast, non-contact glaucoma treatment, and CureSight, a binocular treatment of amblyopia. All three devices were approved by both the US FDA and European authorities.

Professor Belkin established and was the inaugural director of the Tel-Aviv University Eye Research Institute at the Sheba Medical Center, and was among the founders of the Israel Society for Vision & Eye Research, as well as its second president.

He was born in Tel Aviv in 1941. His father, Yerachmiel, was a high ranking military and public official, his elder brother, Uzi, was one of the original settlers of Kibbutz Nahal Oz, and his younger brother, Shimshon, is professor emeritus of Microbiology at the Hebrew University of Jerusalem. He has been married to Ruth (Loeb) Belkin since 1967. They have three children and six grandchildren.

== Education ==
Professor Belkin has a master's degree in natural sciences from the University of Cambridge, and a doctorate in medicine from the Hebrew University of Jerusalem. He completed his residency at Hadassah University Hospital in 1975.

== Career ==
As a Lieutenant Colonel in the Israel Defense Forces Medical Corps, Belkin served as head of the Research, Development and Non-Conventional Warfare Medicine department for three years. During that time, he developed military goggles to protect the eyes of soldiers. He also publicized the threat of laser radiation to the eye and endeavored to develop treatment for laser-induced eye injuries.

Previously, he served as deputy commander of the medical battalion in General Ariel Sharon's armored division, and later as its commander during the 1973 Yom Kippur war. He was one of the first physicians to cross the Suez Canal in the Israeli counter attack.

Professor Belkin is named as the inventor or co-inventor of over 40 patents and is the author of over 500 scientific publications.

He held the Sidney A. Fox Chair of Ophthalmology at Tel-Aviv University and, since 2006, has been a Senior Scientific Advisor to the Singapore Eye Research Institute.

Professor Belkin founded Belkin Vision in 2013 and served as the company's Chief Medical Officer until it was acquired by Alcon. He serves on the boards and scientific advisory boards of various companies engaged in developing novel ophthalmic technologies.

During the 2026 Asia-Pacific Glaucoma Congress Professor Belkin received the glaucoma community's APGS awards from Prof. Wong, Head of Glaucoma at the Singapore National Eye Centre. The following day, he was awarded the Singapore National Eye Centre (SNEC) International Gold Medal, SNEC's highest international honor, presented by Prof. Mehta, Chairman of the Singapore Eye Research Institute, in recognition of his contributions to advancing ophthalmology worldwide.

== Developments in ophthalmic technology ==
In 1998, Professor Belkin invented a miniature glaucoma implant, the ExPRESS, which was the first approved Minimally Invasive Glaucoma Surgery (MIGS), and established a company, Optonol, to develop and clinically test it. The developed approved product was sold to Alcon and is commonly used in glaucoma surgery.

Professor Belkin invented the novel technology of Direct Selective Trabeculoplasty (DSLT) device, an automatic, non-contact, seconds-long glaucoma treatment. He established a company, BELKIN Vision Ltd., to develop and clinically test the device which is likely to change conventional glaucoma management from a specialized procedure to one that general ophthalmologists can easily perform. He carried out the first-in-human clinical trials of the device which showed that the automated DSLT is a safe and effective method for reducing intra-ocular pressure. The results of the following international multi-center randomized control trials enabled the American and European authorities to approve the device for medical use. These approvals led to the company being purchased by Alcon in 2023.

For the inventions and development of the ExPRESS shunt and DSLT laser he received in 2025 the Visionary Award from the Glaucoma Research foundation. For these and his other contributions, he was given in 2025 the Lifetime Achievements Award by the Israel Ophthalmology Innovation Summit.

Professor Belkin was involved in clinically proving a method to treat adult amblyopia (lazy eye), an achievement that was previously considered impossible. He also invented methods of automatic measuring visual function in children and binocular treatment of amblyopia. To commercialize these inventions, he was involved in establishing a company (NovaSight) which is utilizing eye tracking for the diagnosis and treatment of eye diseases. The company's device for treating amblyopia – CureSight - was approved by the FDA and European authorities and is currently being marketed.

== Research and findings ==
Professor Belkin identified the correlation between the development of myopia and years of schooling and intelligence in a substantial male population aged 17–19.

He was one of the first to prove that reduced visual acuity in the elderly, mostly due to improperly fitted or non-use of eyeglasses is associated with reduced cognitive functions.

Professor Belkin was part of the team investigating the implantation of pre-treated macrophages into rats stimulated tissue repair. This procedure was later extended to human trials for spinal injury patients and established that humans could tolerate the procedure. He was one of the first to use stem cells in vascular and ophthalmic diseases clinically.

He was part of a team researching the link between cigarette smoking and ocular disease, both through tobacco and exposure to passive smoke.

== Selected publications ==
- Polat, U.; Ma-Naim, T.; Belkin, M.; Sagi, D. (19 April 2004). "Improving vision in adult amblyopia by perceptual learning". Proceedings of the National Academy of Sciences. 101 (17): 6692–6697. Bibcode:2004PNAS..101.6692P. doi:10.1073/pnas.0401200101. PMC 404107. PMID 15096608.
- Solberg, Yoram; Rosner, Mordechai; Belkin, Michael (1998). "The Association Between Cigarette Smoking and Ocular Diseases". Survey of Ophthalmology. 42 (6): 535–547. doi:10.1016/s0039-6257(98)00002-2. PMID 9635902.
- Knoller, Nachshon; Auerbach, Gustavo; Fulga, Valentin; Zelig, Gabriel; Attias, Josef; Bakimer, Ronit; Marder, Jonathan B.; Yoles, Eti; Belkin, Michael; Schwartz, Michal; Hadani, Moshe (2005). "Clinical experience using incubated autologous macrophages as a treatment for complete spinal cord injury: Phase I study results". Journal of Neurosurgery: Spine. 3 (3): 173–181. doi:10.3171/spi.2005.3.3.0173. PMID 16235699.
- Barkana, Yaniv; Belkin, Michael (2000). "Laser Eye Injuries". Survey of Ophthalmology. 44 (6): 459–478. doi:10.1016/s0039-6257(00)00112-0. PMID 10906379.
- Battler, Alexander; Scheinowitz, Mickey; Bor, Amir; Hasdai, David; Vered, Zvi; Di Segni, Elio; Varda-Bloom, Nira; Nass, Devorah; Engelberg, Santiago; Eldar, Michael; Belkin, Michael; Savion, Naphtali (1993). "Intracoronary injection of basic fibroblast growth factor enhances angiogenesis in infarcted swine myocardium". Journal of the American College of Cardiology. 22 (7): 2001–2006. doi:10.1016/0735-1097(93)90790-8. PMID 7504006.
- Solberg, Y.; Belkin, M. (1997). "The role of excitotoxicity in organophosphorous nerve agents central poisoning". Trends in Pharmacological Sciences. 18 (6): 183–185. doi:10.1016/s0165-6147(97)89540-5. PMID 9226993.
- Rosner, M.; Belkin, M. (1 November 1987). "Intelligence, Education, and Myopia in Males". Archives of Ophthalmology. 105 (11): 1508–1511. doi:10.1001/archopht.1987.01060110054030. PMID 3675282.
- Surinchak, John S.; Alago, Maria L.; Bellamy, Ronald F.; Stuck, Bruce E.; Belkin, Michael (1983). "Effects of low-level energy lasers on the healing of full-thickness skin defects". Lasers in Surgery and Medicine. 2 (3): 267–274. doi:10.1002/lsm.1900020310. PMID 6843266. S2CID 33939164.
- Hirschberg, David L.; Yoles, Eti; Belkin, Michael; Schwartz, Michal (1994). "Inflammation after axonal injury has conflicting consequences for recovery of function: Rescue of spared axons is impaired but regeneration is supported". Journal of Neuroimmunology. 50 (1): 9–16. doi:10.1016/0165-5728(94)90209-7. PMID 8300861. S2CID 3810035.
- Assia, Ehud; Rosner, Mordechai; Belkin, Michael; Solomon, Arie; Schwartz, Michal (1989). "Temporal parameters of low energy laser irradiation for optimal delay of post-traumatic degeneration of rat optic nerve". Brain Research. 476 (2): 205–212. doi:10.1016/0006-8993(89)91240-7. PMID 2702463. S2CID 13302840.
- Solberg, Yoram; Alcalay, Menachem; Belkin, Michael (1997). "Ocular injury by mustard gas". Survey of Ophthalmology. 41 (6): 461–466. doi:10.1016/s0039-6257(97)00021-0. PMID 9220568.
- Eitan, S; Solomon, A; Lavie, V; Yoles, E; Hirschberg, D.; Belkin, M; Schwartz, M (17 June 1994). "Recovery of visual response of injured adult rat optic nerves treated with transglutaminase". Science. 264 (5166): 1764–1768. Bibcode:1994Sci...264.1764E. doi:10.1126/science.7911602. PMID 7911602.
- Nelson, Darin A.; Krupsky, Sara; Pollack, Ayala; Aloni, Eyal; Belkin, Michael; Vanzetta, Ivo; Rosner, Mordechai; Grinvald, Amiram (1 January 2005). "Special Report: Noninvasive Multi-Parameter Functional Optical Imaging of the Eye". Ophthalmic Surgery, Lasers and Imaging Retina. 36 (1): 57–66. doi:10.3928/15428877-20050101-07. PMID 15688972.
- Schwartz, M; Belkin, M; Yoles, E; Solomon, A (1996). "Potential treatment modalities for glaucomatous neuropathy: neuroprotection and neuroregeneration". Journal of Glaucoma. 5 (6): 427–32. doi:10.1097/00061198-199612000-00012. PMID 8946301. S2CID 32199067.
- Schwartz, M.; Solomon, A.; Lavie, V.; Ben-Bassat, S.; Belkin, M.; Cohen, A. (1991). "Tumor necrosis factor facilitates regeneration of injured central nervous system axons". Brain Research. 545 (1–2): 334–338. doi:10.1016/0006-8993(91)91309-o. PMID 1860055. S2CID 20900035.
- Cohen, Yuval; Belkin, Michael; Yehezkel, Oren; Solomon, Arieh S.; Polat, Uri (2011). "Dependency between light intensity and refractive development under light–dark cycles". Experimental Eye Research. 92 (1): 40–46. doi:10.1016/j.exer.2010.10.012. PMID 21055401.
- Rotenstreich, Ygal; Belkin, Michael; Sadetzki, Siegal; Chetrit, Angela; Ferman-Attar, Gili; Sher, Ifat; Harari, Ayelet; Shaish, Aviv; Harats, Dror (2013-08-01). "Treatment With 9-cis β-Carotene–Rich Powder in Patients With Retinitis Pigmentosa: A Randomized Crossover Trial". JAMA Ophthalmology. 131 (8): 985–992. doi:10.1001/jamaophthalmol.2013.147. ISSN 2168-6165. PMID 23700011.
- Elyashiv, SM; Shabtai, EL; Belkin, M (January 2014). "Correlation between visual acuity and cognitive functions". British Journal of Ophthalmology. 98 (1): 129–32. doi:10.1136/bjophthalmol-2013-304149. PMC 4060517. PMID 24169658.
- Spierer, Oriel; Fischer, Naomi; Barak, Adiel; Belkin, Michael (January 2016). "Correlation Between Vision and Cognitive Function in the Elderly: A Cross-Sectional Study". Medicine. 95 (3) e2423. doi:10.1097/MD.0000000000002423. PMC 4998246. PMID 26817872.
- Porat, Yael; Assa-Kunik, Efrat; Belkin, Michael; Krakovsky, Michael; Lamensdorf, Itschak; Duvdevani, Revital; Sivak, Galit; Niven, Mark J.; Bulvik, Shlomo (2014). "A novel potential therapy for vascular diseases: blood-derived stem/progenitor cells specifically activated by dendritic cells". Diabetes/Metabolism Research and Reviews. 30 (7): 623–634. doi:10.1002/dmrr.2543. ISSN 1520-7560. PMID 24638886.
- Elyashiv, Sivan M.; Shabtai, Esther L.; Belkin, Michael (2014-01-01). "Correlation between visual acuity and cognitive functions". British Journal of Ophthalmology. 98 (1): 129–132. doi:10.1136/bjophthalmol-2013-304149. ISSN 0007-1161. PMC 4060517. PMID 24169658.
