= Military ranks of Denmark =

The military ranks of Denmark are the military insignia used by the Danish Defence. The ranks are split into two overall categories befalingsmænd (lit. 'commanders') and menige (lit. 'privates'), with befalingsmænd being further split into officerer (lit. 'commissioned officers') and underofficerer (lit. 'sub-officers').

== Structure ==
Ranks
Group	Sub-group	Level	NATO code	Pay grade	Description
Commanders	Officers	Leadership	OF-9	M406	The highest rank in the military and reserved only for the Chief of Defence and the King À la suite.
Commanders	Officers	Leadership	OF-8	M405	The second highest rank in the military and until 1970 used for branch chiefs. Now only for the Chief of the Defense Staff, the Chief of Acquisition and the National Armaments Director.
Commanders	Officers	Leadership	OF-7	M404	The third highest rank in the military and is given to the branch chiefs (including the Home Guard), as well as the chiefs of the Operations Staff, Development and Planning Staff, Operational Support Command, Joint Arctic Command, Special Operations Command, Estate Command and the Royal Danish Defence College.
Commanders	Officers	Leadership	OF-6	M403	The rank was introduced in 1983, following the adaptation of the STANAG 2116. The rank is given to deputy branch chiefs, the Surgeon General, commanders of the Health Services, the Maintenance Service, the brigades, or to OF-5 on extended international missions, as a temporary rank.
Commanders	Officers	Leadership	OF-5	M402	
Commanders	Officers	Leadership	OF-4	M401	
Commanders	Officers	Management	OF-3	M332	Established in 2005 as a way to improve avancement for M331 who are unable to advance to M401, due to lack of available positions.
Commanders	Officers	Management	OF-3	M331	
Commanders	Officers	Management	OF-3	M322	Awarded to M321 who have a highly specialised knowledge or 18–20 years' experience as an officer but has not yet completed a Master of Military Studies (MMS).
Commanders	Officers	Management	OF-2	M321	
Commanders	Officers	Management	OF-1	M312	
Commanders	Officers	Management	OF-1	M311	
Commanders	Officers	Management	OF-1	M310	
Commanders	Sub-officers	Middle management	OR-9	M232	
Commanders	Sub-officers	Middle management	OR-8	M231	
Commanders	Sub-officers	Middle management	OR-7	M221	
Commanders	Sub-officers	Middle management	OR-5	M212	
Commanders	Sub-officers	Middle management	OR-5	M211	
Privates	—N/a	Manual level	OR-4	M113	
Privates	—N/a	Manual level	OR-3	M112	
Privates	—N/a	Manual level	OR-2	M112	
Privates	—N/a	Manual level	OR-1	M112	
Privates	—N/a	Manual level	—N/a	M111	Only for conscripts and recruits.

== Commissioned officer ranks ==
The rank insignia of commissioned officers.

NATO code	OF-10	OF-9	OF-8	OF-7	OF-6	OF-5	OF-4	OF-3	OF-2	OF-1
Rank group	Leadership level (Chefniveau)							Management level (Lederniveau)
Royal Danish Army
Royal Danish Army		General	Generalløjtnant	Generalmajor	Brigadegeneral	Oberst	Oberstløjtnant	Major	Kaptajn	Premierløjtnant	Løjtnant	Sekondløjtnant
Royal Danish Navy
Royal Danish Navy		Admiral	Viceadmiral	Kontreadmiral	Flotilleadmiral	Kommandør	Kommandørkaptajn	Orlogskaptajn	Kaptajnløjtnant	Premierløjtnant	Løjtnant
Royal Danish Air Force
Royal Danish Air Force		General	Generalløjtnant	Generalmajor	Brigadegeneral	Oberst	Oberstløjtnant	Major	Kaptajn	Premierløjtnant	Løjtnant	Sekondløjtnant
Danish pay grade	M406		M405	M404	M403	M402	M401	M332 M331 M322	M321	M312	M311	M310

=== Special insignia ===
Rank	OF-9	OF-8	OF-7	OF-6
Army and air force				
Navy				
Vehicle star plate				

== Other ranks ==
The rank insignia of non-commissioned officers and enlisted personnel.

NATO code	OR-9	OR-8	OR-7	OR-6	OR-5		OR-4	OR-3	OR-2	OR-1
Rank group	Middle management level (Mellemlederniveau)						Manual level (Manuelt niveau)
Royal Danish Army
Royal Danish Army	Chefsergent	Seniorsergent	Oversergent		Sergent	Sergent (Officerselev)	Korporal	Overkonstabel af 1. grad	Overkonstabel	Konstabel
Royal Danish Navy
Royal Danish Navy	Chefsergent	Seniorsergent	Oversergent		Sergent	Sergent SØ	Korporal	Marinespecialist	Marineoverkonstabel	Marinekonstabel
Royal Danish Air Force
Royal Danish Air Force	Chefsergent	Seniorsergent	Oversergent		Sergent	Sergent (Officerselev)	Korporal	Flyverspecialist	Flyveroverkonstabel	Flyverkonstabel
Danish pay grade	M232	M231	M221		M212	M211	M113	M112

== Joint ranks ==
Rank group	Non-combat
Judge Advocate Corps
Judge Advocate Corps	Generalauditør		Auditør	Auditørfuldmægtig
Legal
Legal	Militærjuridisk rådgiver
Civilian
Civilian	Civil, chefniveau	Civil, lederniveau	Civil, mellemniveau	Civil, manuelt niveau
Medical
Medical		Speciallæge/ Special tandlæge	Læge/tandlæge uden auto. til selvstændig virke	Ledende afdelingssygeplejerske
Nurse
Nurse		Afdelingssygeplejerske	1. assistent	Sygeplejeassistent
Music
Music	Musikdirigent			Musiker

== See also ==
- Ranks and insignia of Royal Danish Army
- Ranks and insignia of Royal Danish Navy
- Ranks and insignia of Royal Danish Air Force
