= Forsvaret =

Forsvaret or Försvaret may refer to:

- Danish Defence, the military of Denmark
- Norwegian Armed Forces, the military of Norway
- Swedish Armed Forces, the military of Sweden
- Finnish Defence Forces, the military of Finland

== See also ==
- Försvarsmakten (disambiguation)
