= Christian, Crown Prince of Denmark =

Heir apparent to the Danish throne (born 2005)

Christian
- Crown Prince of Denmark; Count of Monpezat
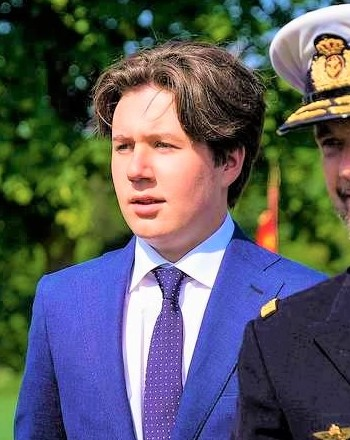
- Christian in 2021
- Born: 15 October 2005 (age 21); Rigshospitalet, Copenhagen, Denmark
Names
- Christian Valdemar Henri John
- Father: Frederik X
- Mother: Mary Donaldson
- Education: Tranegård School; Lemania-Verbier International School; Herlufsholm School; Ordrup Gymnasium
- Military career
- Allegiance: Denmark
- Branch: Royal Danish Army
- Rank: Second lieutenant
- Unit: Royal Life Guards

Christian, Crown Prince of Denmark, Count of Monpezat RE, SKmd (Christian Valdemar Henri John; born 15 October 2005), is the heir apparent to the Danish throne. He is the eldest child of King Frederik X and Queen Mary. He was born during the reign of his paternal grandmother, Queen Margrethe II. He became Crown Prince of Denmark following his grandmother's abdication and his father's subsequent ascension to the Danish throne in January 2024.

== Early life ==
Christian was born on 15 October 2005 at 01:57 CET at Rigshospitalet, the Copenhagen University Hospital, in Copenhagen. At noon on the day of his birth, a 21-gun salute was fired from the Sixtus Battery at Holmen Naval Base in the Port of Copenhagen and at Kronborg Castle in Elsinore to mark the birth of a royal child. At the same time, public buses and official buildings flew the Danish flag, the Dannebrog. At sunset on the same day beacon bonfires were lit all across Denmark, while Naval Home Guard vessels lit their searchlights and directed them towards the capital.

Christian was baptised on 21 January 2006 in Christiansborg Palace Chapel by the Bishop of Copenhagen Erik Norman Svendsen. He was baptised at the royal baptismal font which has been used for the baptism of royal children in Denmark since 1671, and wore the royal christening gown which was made for his great-great-grandfather, King Christian X, in 1870. Christian's godparents are his paternal uncle, Prince Joachim of Denmark; his maternal aunt, Jane Stephens; his father's first cousin, the Crown Prince of Greece; King Haakon VIII and Queen Mette-Marit of Norway (then Crown Prince and Crown Princess); the Crown Princess of Sweden; and two friends of the couple, Jeppe Handwerk and Hamish Campbell. He was named Christian Valdemar Henri John, continuing the Danish royal tradition of alternating between the names Christian and Frederik in direct line. He received a number of presents on the occasion of his christening, including a pony called Flikflak from the Folketing, Denmark's national parliament.

On 11 September 2006, Per Stig Møller, Denmark's Minister for Foreign Affairs, formally wrote and signed a hand-written document confirming Prince Christian's place in the line of succession. The prince's full name, his dates of birth and baptism, and the names of his godparents were recorded as dictated by the Royal Law of 1799.

=== Education ===
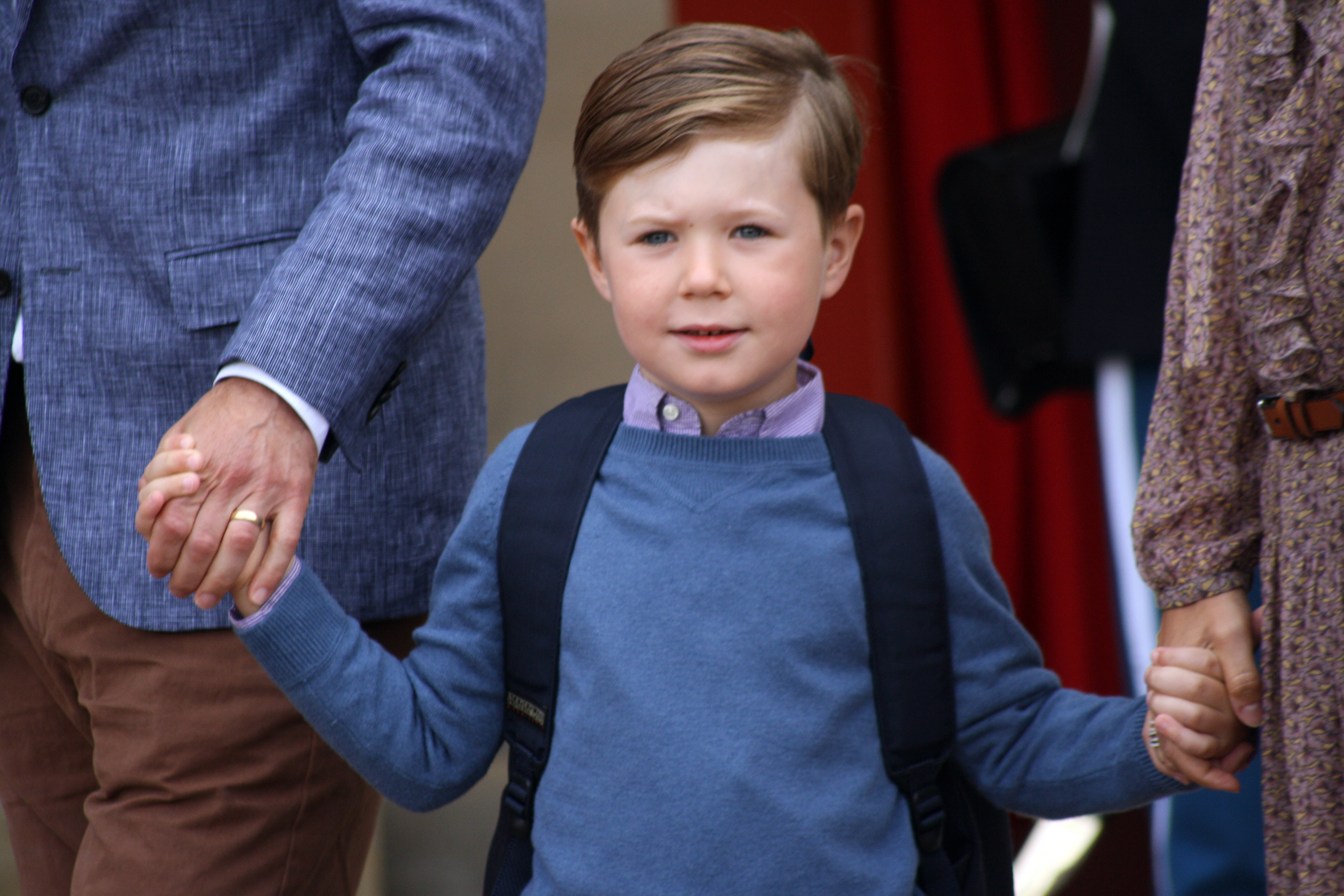
Prince Christian of Denmark escorted by his parents on his first day of school in August 2011

Christian was the first member of the Danish royal family to attend nursery school. He initially attended nursery school at Queen Louise's Asylum Kindergarten in Fredensborg before transferred to Garrison Church's Congregational Kindergarten at Sankt Annæ Plads. At the same age, his father had a nanny at the Palace to teach him rudimentary lessons. He is also the first member of the royal family to attend a public state school, Tranegård School in Hellerup. The Danish court announced in October 2019 that Christian and his three younger siblings would undertake a 12-week school stay at Lemania-Verbier International School in Verbier, Switzerland, in the beginning of 2020. The stay was cut short and the siblings returned home in March due to the intensification of the COVID-19 situation in Denmark. In April 2021, it was announced that Christian would undertake his secondary education at the Danish boarding school Herlufsholm, starting in August 2021. In June 2022, shortly after finishing the first year of his upper secondary education, it was announced that Christian would no longer attend the school, after recurring allegations of bullying, violence and sexual abuse at the institution surfaced in a documentary. Instead, he transferred to the public gymnasium, Ordrup Gymnasium. He graduated in June 2024.

=== Activities ===
Christian undertook his first official engagement when he attended the opening of a new elephant house at the Copenhagen Zoo with his grandfather, Prince Henrik in 2008. Christian opened the elephant house by pressing a button on an interactive console. The elephants were a gift from the King and Queen of Thailand to the Queen and Prince Consort of Denmark on their visit to Thailand. In 2010, Christian and his grandfather revealed a portrait of Prince Ulrik at the Museum of National History at Frederiksborg Castle, and in 2012, also at the Museum of National History, he and Queen Margrethe II revealed the first ever portrait of him (with his father and grandmother), commissioned for the Queen's Ruby Jubilee. He and his siblings accompanied their parents on an official visit to Greenland on 1–8 August 2014, where Christian partook in several official engagements. Likewise, he accompanied his parents on most of their engagements during the family's official visit to the Faroe Islands on 23–26 August 2018.

Christian was confirmed on 15 May 2021 in the Royal Chapel of Fredensborg Palace. On 13 June 2021, Christian accompanied his grandmother and father at the COVID-19 postponed centenary of the reunification of Denmark and Northern Schleswig, following the route his great-great-grandfather Christian X rode on 15 July 1920 over the old border between Denmark and Germany. Accompanying his father, Christian attended a memorial for the victims of the 2022 Copenhagen mall shooting on 5 July 2022.

For the 18th birthday of Prince Christian, which marked the beginning of his royal duties, Margrethe II hosted a banquet at Christianborg Palace. In attendance were members of the Danish royal family, including Christian's parents, siblings, cousins and Princess Benedikte, and 200 members of the Danish public youth who had distinguished themselves in sport, art and culture. Additionally, Margrethe II invited eleven members of foreign royal families – Queen Anne-Marie of Greece, the Crown Prince and Crown Princess of Greece, the Crown Prince and Crown Princess of Norway, Princess Ingrid Alexandra of Norway, the Crown Princess of Sweden, the Duke of Västergötland, the Duchess of Östergötland, the Princess of Orange and the Duchess of Brabant. A photo was captured on the night that contained the future monarchs of Belgium, Denmark, the Netherlands, Norway and Sweden. The official Danish royal family's Instagram account posted the following day a photo of a single sparkling shoe that was left in the palace and wrote, "Is it Cinderella who forgot her shoe last night?"

== Military service ==
On 3 February 2025, Christian began his conscription with the Guard Hussar Regiment at Antvorskov Barracks in Slagelse. Tradition in the regiment dictates that the hussars are known by the name of their respective home town and traditionally, each hussar would lead its cavalry regiment into their own home towns. He was given the name "Trekroner" in reference to the Trekroner fortification which marks the entrance to Copenhagen Harbour. During his military service, Christian has renounced his salary and any money that conscripts receive.

On 28 May 2025, Christian completed his conscription following the completion of the traditional "REX-tour", a strenuous four-day military exercise undertaken by conscripts in the Guard Hussar Regiment and the Royal Life Guards. At the same time, it was announced that he had been admitted into the Royal Danish Army's Lieutenant School where he started training to become a lieutenant in August 2025. In January 2026, it was announced that Christian will serve as a platoon commander in the Royal Life Guards based at Høvelte Barracks starting August 2026.

== Crown Prince of Denmark ==
Christian is first in line to the Danish throne and eldest child of King Frederik X. Since the 16th century, first-born sons of Danish monarchs have traditionally been alternately named Frederik and Christian.

Christian's grandmother, Queen Margrethe II, announced her pending abdication on live television in her New Year's Eve address on 31 December 2023. On 14 January 2024, Prince Christian, the Queen, and Crown Prince Frederik participated in a meeting of the Council of State, with the cabinet ministers and the council of state secretary in attendance. The moment the Queen signed a declaration of her abdication, Crown Prince Frederik acceded to the Danish throne as King Frederik X. Christian, who became the heir apparent, is referred to as "HRH Crown Prince Christian". In January 2024, Christian became a regent for the first time during his father's three day state visit to Poland. He signed his first law at Amalienborg Palace on 31 January 2024.

On 20 May 2024, Christian carried out his first solo engagement when he participated in Royal Run 2024's Brønderslev leg. On 2 September 2024, he carried out his first solo official trip abroad, visiting the Danish athletes at the 2024 Summer Paralympics in Paris, France.

On 6 June 2026, Christian represented his grandmother at the official inauguration of Queen Margrethe II's Bridge when she was unable to attend following to a recent hospitalisation. On 9 September 2026, he attended the state funeral of King Harald V of Norway in Oslo Cathedral alongside his parents and great-aunt, Princess Benedikte of Denmark. In October 2026, Christian participated in his first state banquet in connection with the Vietnamese state visit to Denmark. In honour of his 21st birthday on 15 October 2026, Frederik X made him Grand Commander of the Order of the Dannebrog.

== Personal life ==
Christian is godfather to his second cousin, Prince Gustav Albrecht, the son of Gustav, 7th Prince of Sayn-Wittgenstein-Berleburg. He served as page boy at the 2010 wedding of his godmother, the Crown Princess of Sweden.

Christian is an avid fan of the football club F.C. Copenhagen and has frequently been seen attending their matches.

== Titles, styles, honours, and arms ==
=== Titles ===
- 15 October 2005 – 29 April 2008: His Royal Highness Prince Christian of Denmark
- 29 April 2008 – 14 January 2024: His Royal Highness Prince Christian of Denmark, Count of Monpezat
- 14 January 2024 – present: His Royal Highness The Crown Prince of Denmark, Count of Monpezat

=== Honours ===
==== National honours ====
===== Orders and appointments =====
- Knight of the Order of the Elephant (15 October 2023) (R.E.)
- Grand Commander of the Order of the Dannebrog (15 October 2026) (S.Kmd.)

===== Medals and decorations =====
- Prince Henrik's 75th Birthday Medal (11 June 2009)
- Queen Margrethe II's 70th Birthday Medal (16 April 2010)
- Queen Margrethe II's Ruby Jubilee Medal (14 January 2012)
- Queen Margrethe II's 75th Birthday Medal (16 April 2015)
- Queen Margrethe II and Prince Henrik's Golden Wedding Anniversary Medal (10 June 2017)
- Prince Henrik's Memorial Medal (11 June 2018)
- Queen Margrethe II's 80th Birthday Medal (16 April 2020)
- Queen Margrethe II's Golden Jubilee Medal (14 January 2022)

==== Foreign honours ====
- Norway:
  - Grand Cross of the Royal Norwegian Order of Saint Olav (15 October 2023)

=== Other honours ===
In 2006 Scandinavian Airlines System was in the process of purchasing new Airbus A319 aircraft and in Christian's honour the first of these, delivered on 8 August 2006, was named Christian Valdemar Viking.

=== Arms ===
Coat of arms of Christian, Crown Prince of Denmark

Crown Prince Christian's coat of arms is similar to the royal coat of arms except for the heir apparent's crown and the purple mantle.

Royal monogram

== Notes ==
Christian, Crown Prince of Denmark Born: 15 October 2005
Danish royalty
Preceded by Frederik	Crown Prince of Denmark; 2024–present	Incumbent
Lines of succession
First Heir apparent	Succession to the Danish throne 1st position	Followed by Princess Isabella of Denmark
