= Lone Træholt =

Danish Air Force general

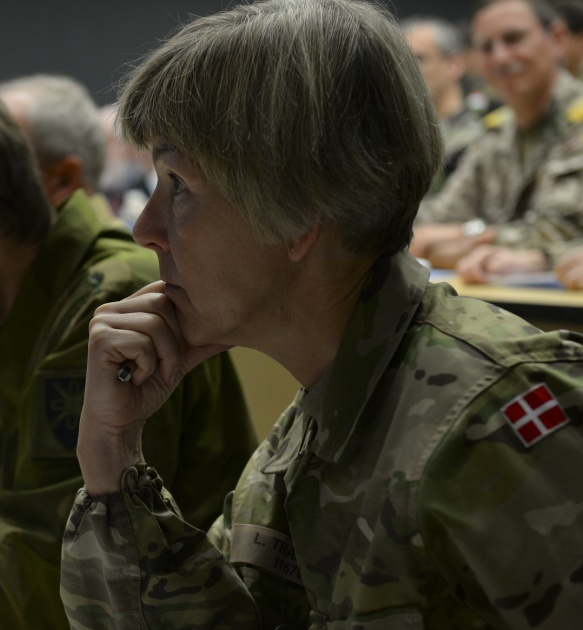
- Pictured in 2016
- Born: July 15, 1958 (age 68); Løkken, Denmark
- Military career
- Allegiance: Denmark
- Branch: Royal Danish Air Force
- Service years: 1979-
- Rank: Brigadier-general

Lone Træholt is the first woman in the Danish armed forces to obtain the rank of general. On 30 September 2016, she was promoted to brigadier general in the Royal Danish Air Force, heading the Tactical Air Staff. In 2000, Træholt became the first woman in the Danish Air Force to hold the rank of lieutenant colonel (Danish: oberstløjtnant), and in 2008, she became the first woman in the Danish Air Force to hold the rank of colonel (Danish: oberst).

== Early life and education ==
Born on 15 July 1958 in Løkken in north-western Jutland, Lone Træholt matriculated from Brønderslev Gymnasium in 1977. She had initially considered studying biology but her elder brother, who was an air force pilot, convinced her to follow in his footsteps. She therefore trained as an officer at the Royal Danish Air Force Academy (1979–83). She underwent further officer training at the Royal Danish Military Academy in 1986 and 1992–93. More recently, she has completed courses in military leadership.

== Career ==
Træholt has risen through the Danish Air Force officer ranks since 1981 when she became second lieutenant. She was subsequently promoted to first lieutenant (1983), captain (1986), major (1993), lieutenant colonel (2000), and colonel (2008). Major responsibilities in recent years have included Chief of Staff Aalborg Air Base (2003–06), Chief of Planning, Tactical Air Command (2007), and Chief, Air Control Wing, Air Base Karup (2008–11).

She has also served in NATO as Military Assistant for COMBALTAP/Commander JHNE, Karup (1998–2000), Branchhead Air Enablers Branch, Air Command Ramstein (2011–13), and Division Head Combat Operations Division, CAOC Uedem, Germany (2014–16). She has also served the United Nations as Information Operations Officer in Kinshasa, Democratic Republic of the Congo (2007–08).

As a result of her lengthy service as a woman in the Danish military, Træholt has followed how attitudes to women's recruitment have evolved over the years. She hopes that her promotion to rank of general will give her opportunities to encourage more women to join up and remain for longer than they usually do in comparison to men. While Træholt generally feels she has been treated on an equal basis with men, she recognizes that in her early years she was not permitted to fly in Denmark. She has revealed how difficult it was for her and three female colleagues to take flying lessons at the old Avnø flying school near Præstø as flying was considered to be a sacrosanct area for men alone. She always remembers being told at the flying school: "It's a shame you're a woman. You fly so well." Only when she was stationed in Germany was she able to fly without restriction. Right up to the 1980s, in Denmark it was felt that women were too fragile to fly.

Lone Træholt is married and has a son in his early thirties. She was the only female general in the Danish armed forces until the army promoted Jette Albinus to the rank of general on 11 September 2017.

== Awards ==
Træholt has been honoured with numerous awards and medals, including the Order of the Dannebrog as a Commander, the Danish Defence Medal, and the Kuwait Liberation Medal.
