= Danish Defence Media Agency =

- Forsvarets Mediecenter

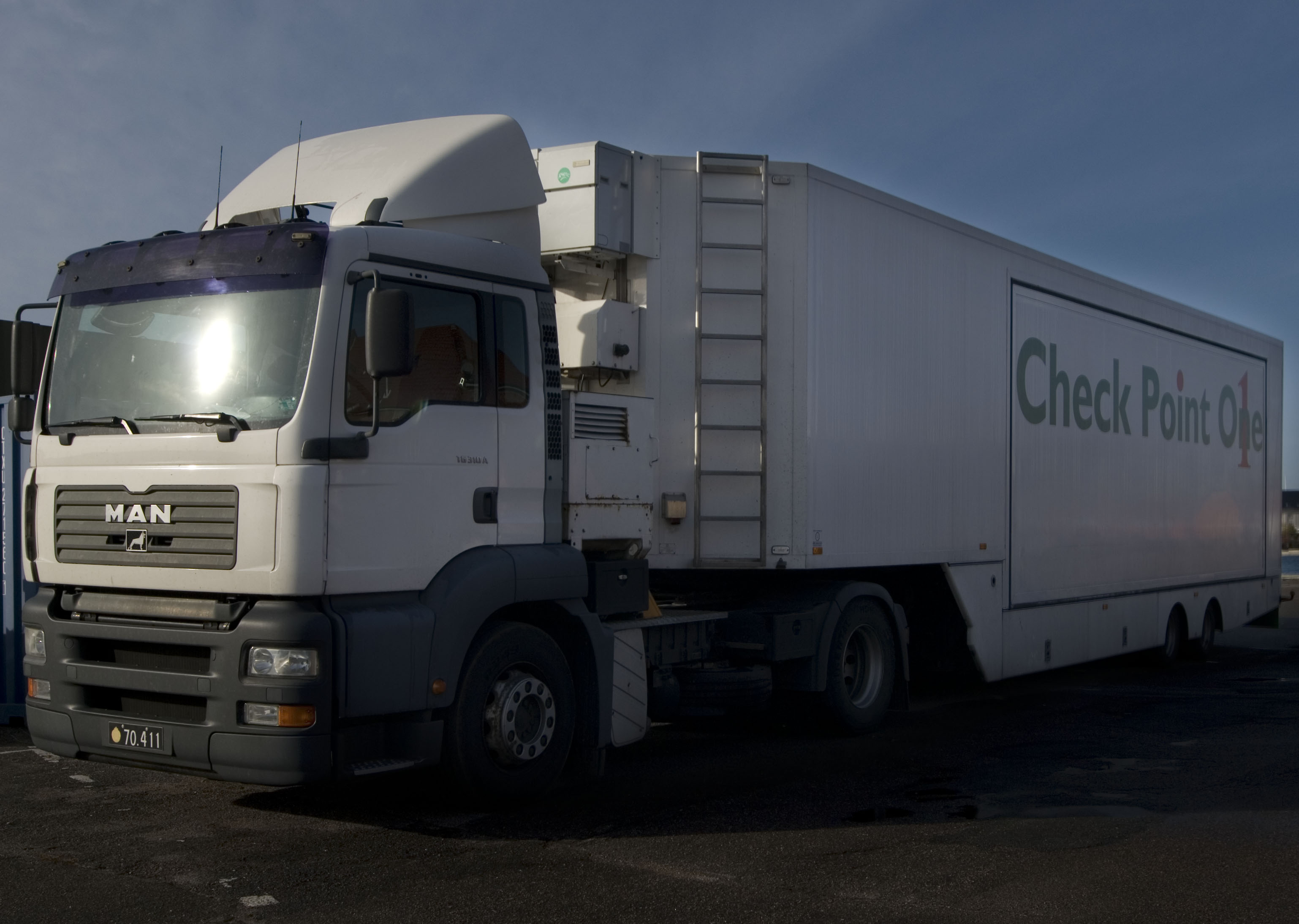
- The promo-truck Check Point One was operated by the Danish Defence Media Agency

Agency overview
- Dissolved: 31 January 2012
- Superseding Agency: Forsvarskommandoens Kommunikationsafdeling
- Employees: 39
- Agency executive: Vickie Lind, Editorial manager
- Parent Agency: Ministry of Defence

The Danish Defence Media Agency (Danish: Forsvarets Mediecenter, abbrev. FMC) was a public relations agency terminated on January 31, 2012. It produced media and broadcasts about the Danish Defence, including the web-TV channel Forsvarskanalen. It was part of the Defence Command.

It also provided imagery to national broadcast services and newspapers, published the employee magazine Forsvaret and provided services for the Ministry of Defence as well as did media-training for military personnel.

39 persons were employed by the agency on its closing date and at the end it was under editorial management by Vickie Lind.
