= Army Materiel Command =

Army Materiel Command can refer to:

- United States Army Materiel Command
- Army Materiel Command (Denmark)
