= Danish Defence IT Agency =

- Forsvarets Koncernfælles Informatiktjeneste

Agency overview
- Formed: 1 January 2006; 20 years ago
- Type: Support organisation
- Headquarters: Kastellet, Denmark
- Employees: approx. 300
- Agency executive: Asger S. Olesen, Director
- Parent Agency: Acquisition and Logistics Organization

The Danish Defence IT Agency (Danish: Forsvarets Koncernfælles Informatiktjeneste, abbrev. FKIT) is a joint service under the Danish Defence Command, tasked with service and support of IT-equipment in the Danish Armed Forces. In 2014, it was placed under the control of the Acquisition and Logistics Organization.

== Tasks ==
The Danish Defence IT Agency services approx. 21,000 units and support approx. 17,000 users. This include infrastructure, hardware and software maintenance and reconstruction, covering all Danish military installations; both local and abroad and embedded in deployed units as well as maintenance of the Danish Defence SAP-based DeMars (Defence Management and Resource Control System) ERP-system.

== Organisation ==
The Danish Defence IT Agency is divided into seven departments, each containing several sections: The support staff department, the plans, policy and projects department, the infrastructure and application department, the communication and classified systems department, the service department, the resource and tender department, the DeMars architecture and economy department and the DeMars personnel, structure and logistic department.
