= Materiel Command =

Materiel Command may refer to:

- United States Army Materiel Command
- Army Materiel Command (Denmark)
- Air Force Materiel Command, current major command of the United States Air Force
- Air Materiel Command, former command of the USAF and USAAF
