= 1948 Easter Crisis =

Crisis in Denmark from fear of Soviet invasion

The 1948 Easter Crisis (Danish: Påskekrisen 1948) was the fear that the Soviet Union or Soviet-aligned Communists were planning an invasion or coup d'état in Denmark, in the wake of the 1948 Communist Coup in Czechoslovakia. Until this crisis, Denmark had tried to remain neutral between East and West, but in the election of 1947, the Communists had been reduced from 18 to 9 seats in the Folketing, removing them from participation in the parliamentary defence and security committee. It was now possible for defence to be discussed without any Communist intervention. Growing fear of attack from the East caused Denmark's government led by Hans Hedtoft to align with the West. After an abortive attempt to form a Scandinavian Defence Union with Finland, Iceland, Norway and Sweden, Denmark joined NATO in 1949.

== Background ==
In the first years after the end of the Second World War the world saw increased tension between the US, Great Britain, France, and the Soviet Union on the other side. The Soviet Union had liberated numerous eastern European countries from Nazi-German occupation but quickly supported communist uprisings, thus, turning them into vassal governments to the Soviet Union. The Baltic states were annexed by the Soviet Union, the communists took power in Poland in 1947, in Hungary there was massive communist pressure on the government, Romania was occupied by the USSR which then helped tighten the grip on occupied East Germany. In Czechoslovakia, a Soviet-backed coup brought the communists to power in February 1948. The Czechoslovak coup d'état brought fear to the west and in Denmark. Later in February 1948 the Soviet Union proposed an agreement of friendship, cooperation, and mutual assistance to Finland, which triggered immense worries about the Soviet Union's intent for the rest of the Nordic region.

After the Second World War, Denmark had decided to keep its neutrality and had no alliances, however, the situation for Denmark was that the nation was unable to defend itself in case of an invasion, which the Social Democratic Minister of Defense Rasmus Hansen informed the Foreign Policy Committee (Danish: Det Udenrigspolitisk Nævn) about in January 1948. The communist coup in Czechoslovakia and criticism in the Soviet press which claimed collaboration with the Western Powers put further pressure on the Danish Social Democratic government, and in March 1948 requested the Danish Defence (Danish: Forsvaret) to draw up defense plans that could defend Denmark "at very short notice" in the event of a violation of Danish neutrality. At the same time, the government received rumours of an imminent coup from Danish Communists, many of whom were presumed to be in possession of weapons, that were left over from the Danish resistance movement during the Nazi German occupation of Denmark in World War II. The Danish embassy in the US reported that Denmark should not expect help from the United States in the event of Soviet aggression, unless Denmark itself offered serious and vigorous resistance to an invasion force. It was expected that the US and the other Western Powers would react to Soviet aggression in Central and Southern Europe, unlike in neutral Scandinavia where it would be difficult for the Western powers to defend, at least without an immense defence effort from the countries themselves. In 1948 the Danish government requested American arms aid to demonstrate its willingness to defend itself from an invading force.

On 17 March 1948 Great Britain, France, Netherlands, Belgium and Luxembourg established a military alliance known as the Western Union, but without the participation of the neutral Scandinavian countries. On the same day the American President Truman gave a speech to the Senate where he emphasized the importance of an attacked country's willingness to defend themselves as a prerequisite before receiving American aid, just as Truman touched on the uncertain situation in Scandinavia.

== Crisis ==
The growing rumours of a Soviet-backed communist coup or an invasion led the Danish government to appoint a Defence Staff (Danish: Forsvarsstaben) for each of the three Service branches which was to prepare an actual defense plan in the event of an attack. On 22 March 1948 it was decided that the Easter leave (Danish: Påskeorloven) was to be suspended for several soldiers who would thus not be sent home from the garrisons during Easter holiday. On 24 March 1948 (the day before Maundy Thursday) Prime minister Hans Hedtoft informed The Foreign Policy Committee that the army and the police were on heightened alert and had intensified surveillance and patrol duties. Danish warships where stationed at Anholt, Læsø and Samsø. On the same day, the citizens were encouraged through the radio to report anything "that may be aimed at the security of the Danish state or the Danish people". During the Easter holidays, the Danish police and several Home Guard associations had stationed personnel at the Jægersborg Dyrehave, where there were rumours that Soviet paratroopers would be dropped. While a Dramatic atmosphere did prevail over the Easter holiday that year, no invasion or attempted coup was attempted, and already a few days later on 30 March 1948 the heightened alertness was gradually wound down. On 5 April 1948 it was announced that the request for arms aid could not be granted, but that it had noted the Danish willingness to defend itself, which was a prerequisite for American aid.

== Aftermath ==
The 1948 Easter Crisis and the lead-up to it showed the difficulties in remaining a non-aligned neutral nation during the beginning of the Cold War. The crisis therefore became in many ways a catalyst for finding a permanent security policy solution for Denmark. Venstre and the Konservative party wanted to join the West while the social democrat government wanted to maintain Danish neutrality and looked with concern at the Western Union and instead wanted a Scandinavian defence union that could protect Danish neutrality. Before the Easter crisis there had been talk of such an alliance, and after Easter in 1948 these discussions had intensified. However, neither Norway nor Sweden shared the interests of the Danish social democratic government, and in February 1949 the negotiations were finally interrupted when Norway announced that it preferred a solution for Norway's security was in the form of a NATO membership. A Danish-Swedish defence alliance was not in Sweden's interest either and the social democratic government saw no other option than to give up neutrality and was forced to join NATO like Norway.

The Easter Crisis also resulted in the formalization of Home Guard associations, which were brought together in a state Home Guard. The Home Guard Act was passed in July 1948 and came into effect on 1 April 1949.
