= Antvorskov Barracks =

Antvorskov barracks
- Gardehusarkasernen
- Charlottedal Allé 4, 4200 Slagelse; Near Slagelse in Denmark

Site information
- Type: Barracks
- Owner: Ministry of Defence
- Operator: Royal Danish Army
- Open to the public: Museum open to public, after appointment
- Website: Official website

Location
- Coordinates: 55°22′55.32″N 11°22′28.06″E

Site history
- Built: 1969

Garrison information
- Current commander: Colonel Jens Ole Rossen-Jørgensen
- Occupants: I.Bataljon; II.Bataljon; IV.Bataljon; V.Bataljon; HESK

Antvorskov Barracks is a barracks located near Slagelse in Denmark. It was established in 1969 and currently houses the 2nd Brigade and the Guard Hussar Regiment including its mounted squadron. The latter was moved here from Næstved Kaserne in August 2003.

The building was constructed in a modernistic style.

== 2009 Robbery ==
On the night between January 3 and 4 2009, the garrison was robbed by three masked and armed men. The robbers escaped in a stolen car with weapons, including M/95 rifles and 45 M/96 carbines, and ammunition from the armory. After an initial investigation recovered some of the weapons, 19 M/95 and 45 M/96 carbines along with other 38 assorted small arms remained unaccounted for. On 22 November 2011 the police recovered the last of the stolen weapons.
