= Danish Defence Acquisition and Logistics Organization =

Defence Acquisition and Logistics Organisation
- Forsvarets Materiel- og Indkøbsstyrelse

Organization overview
- Formed: 1 October 2014; 11 years ago
- Preceding Organization: FMT
- Type: Military acquisition & logistics
- Headquarters: Ballerup, Denmark
- Employees: approx. 2,400
- Organization executive: Lt.gen. Niels Henrik Bundsgaard, Commanding officer
- Parent Organization: Ministry of Defence
- Child Organization: Defence IT Agency
- Website: Official Webpage

The Danish Defence Acquisition and Logistics Organisation (DALO) (Danish: Forsvarets Materiel- og Indkøbsstyrelse, FMI) is a joint service unit under the Ministry of Defence, tasked with purchase, service and support of equipment within the Danish Defence. It used to be known as the Danish Defence Material Service (Forsvarets Materieltjeneste, FMT).

== Tasks ==
DALO acquires, maintains and phases out equipment for all of the military authorities - from tanks, ships and aircraft to boots and pocket knives. In collaboration with the Joint Defence Command, FMI ensures support and supplies for the Armed Forces ongoing operations at home and abroad.

== Organisation ==
In 2006, Army Materiel Command, Navy Materiel Command and Air Materiel Command, were merged to form the joint materiel command (FMT). As part of the Danish Defence Agreement 2013-2017, FMT was reorganized into FMI.

The new FMI (pr. 1 October 2014) is subject to the Ministry of Defence department, and manages nearly DKK 7 billion (approx. US$1 billion) of the total defence budget. Ministry of Defence department and FMI worked together to prepare a performance where, among other FMI's role, mission and vision are described.

== Commander ==
No.	Portrait	Name (born–died)	Term of office			Defence branch	Ref.
No.	Portrait	Name (born–died)	Took office	Left office	Time in office	Defence branch	Ref.
Defence Material Service (Forsvarets Materieltjeneste)
1		Counter admiral Finn Hansen (born 1957)	1 January 2006	15 March 2008	2 years, 74 days	Navy	
2		Lieutenant general Per Ludvigsen (born 1957)	15 March 2008	15 March 2011	3 years, 0 days	Army	
3		Lieutenant general Per Pugholm Olsen (born 1964)	15 March 2011	1 March 2015	3 years, 351 days	Air force	
Defence Acquisition and Logistics Organisation (Forsvarets Materiel- og Indkøbsstyrelse)
4		Lieutenant general Niels Henrik Bundsgaard (born 1957)	1 March 2015	1 July 2017	2 years, 122 days	Army	
5		Lieutenant general Flemming Lentfer (born 1964)	1 July 2017	1 December 2020	3 years, 153 days	Air force	
–		Brigadier general Peter Christian Alexa (born 1968); Acting	1 December 2020	14 December 2020	13 days	Air force	
6		Lieutenant general Kim Jesper Jørgensen (born 1962)	14 December 2020	1 May 2024	3 years, 139 days	Air force	
(3)		Lieutenant general Per Pugholm Olsen (born 1964)	1 May 2024	Incumbent	2 years, 99 days	Air force	
