= Försvarsmakten =

Försvarsmakten is a Swedish word meaning "The Defence Force". It is:

- The official name in Swedish of the Swedish Armed Forces
- The official name in Swedish of the Finnish Defence Forces
