= Army Materiel Command (Denmark) =

- Hærens Materielkommando
- Active: 1602; 1 November 1968 (activated)
- Disbanded: 1 January 2007
- Country: Denmark
- Branch: Royal Danish Army
- Role: Military acquisition & logistics
- Size: 1103 civilian & military
- Headquarters: Hjørring
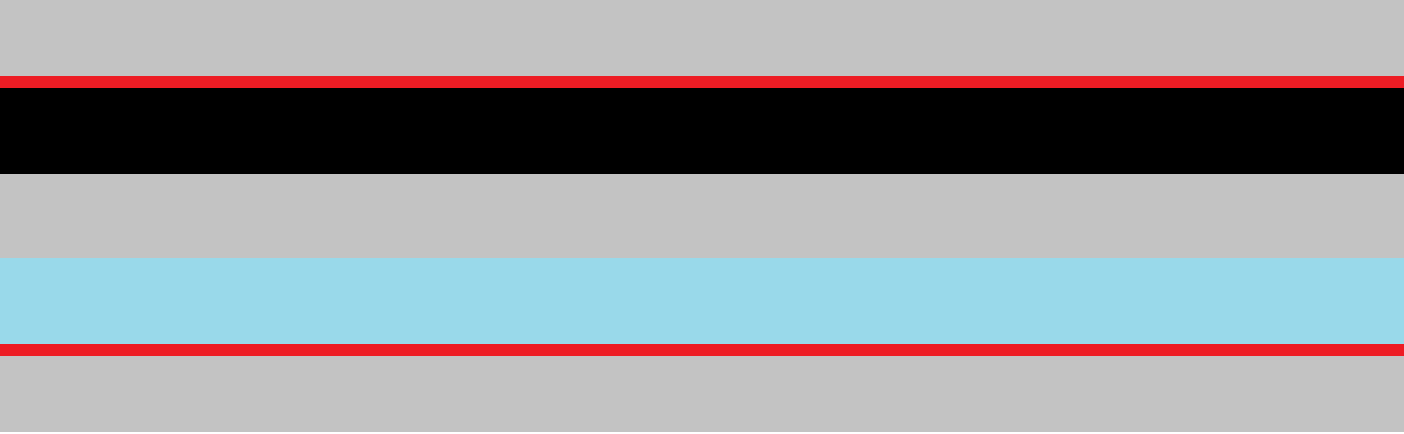
- Regimental belt

Army Materiel Command (Danish: Hærens Materielkommando), short "HMAK", was the Royal Danish Army's institution in all matters of materiel, including supply, maintenance and production. Anything from tanks to the sunglasses of troops or which kind of chocolate is in the field rations. It was a Level II command authority, directly under the Defence Command. In 2006 it was merged with the air force and navy materiel commands, creating the unified Defense Materiel Service, originally FMT and later known as FMI.

HMAK was until its end the oldest institution of the military of Denmark, and could trace its history back to 1602. It was run like a modern company, with depots and workshops all over the country. It employed roughly 1100 people, with 700 of them located in Hjørring. The central authority, in Hjørring, became the Defense Materiel Command headquarters.

== History ==
In 1596 it was thought that it would be a good idea to get an overview of all the war materiel in the King's inventory. So in 1597 the counting and collection in armouries began, primarily to locations in or around Copenhagen and the King's castle. In 1598 the construction of the main armoury, called "Tøjhuskomplekset" (now "Tøjhusmuseet"), began. Tøjhuskomplekset was to be the main armoury for storage, maintenance and production of the King's war materiel, for both the Army and Navy.

Hans Kost became its first chief on August 18, 1602; this day is counted as the origin of HMAK, which celebrated its 400th anniversary in August 2002. Tøjhuskomplekset was completed in 1604.

From 1615 the artillery corps handled the administration of the armies materiel needs. From 1675 the engineer corps also took some part in this. In 1762 a lot of smaller, more specific, branches took administration of their respective areas.

In 1909 Army Technical Corps (Danish: Hærens Tekniske Korps, "HTK") was formed to take organizational command of some of all those administration areas. Still numerous departments, companies, regiments and corps to handle materiel came and went doing the next 60 years, some under HTK, some independent.

HMAK was formed November 1, 1968, by combining Army Technical Corps, Engineer Technical Service, Army Signal Service, The Weapon Armoury, and some smaller areas of other troops, into one organization. The organization was a central authority with three assembling areas (Parkområder), named "Nordjyske Parkområde" (North Jutland Assembly Area), "Sydjyske Parkområde" (South Jutland Assembly Area) and "Sjællandske Parkområde" (Zealand Assembly Area).

November 1, 1971, the central authority relocated to Hjørring. In 1983 "Nordjyske Parkområde" and "Sydjyske Parkområde" were combined into "Jyske Parkområde" (Jutland assembling area).

In January 1991, HMAK was organized into "Army Supply Service" (Hærens Forsyningstjeneste), "Army Technical Service" (Hærens Tekniske Tjeneste), "Jutland assembling area" (Jyske Parkområde), "Zealand assembling area" (Sjællandske Parkområde) and "Munition Arsenal" (Ammunitionsarsenalet).

In 1997 "Jutland assembling area" and "Zealand assembling area" was combined into "Army assembling area" (Hærens Parkområde).

== Subordinated Level. III authorities ==
- Army Assembling Area (Danish: Hærens Parkområde - HPO)
  - Zealand Assembling Area (Sjællandske Parkområde)
  - Jutlandic Assembling Area (Jyske Parkområde; from 1983)
    - North Jutlandic Assembling Area (Nordjyske Parkområde; until 1983)
    - South Jutlandic Assembling Area (Sydjyske Parkområde; until 1983)
- Army Head Workshop (Hærens Hovedværksted - HHV)
- Munition Arsenal (Ammunitionsarsenalet - AMA)

== Sources ==
- HMAK history Closed down
- new command authority active
