= Danish Defence =

Armed forces of Denmark

- Forsvaret
- Coat of arms

- War flag and Ensign of Denmark
- Motto: Fordi noget er værd at kæmpe for (transl. Because something is worth fighting for)
- Founded: 1950; 76 years ago
- Current form: Danish Defence Agreement 2024–2033
- Service branches: Royal Danish Army; Royal Danish Navy; Royal Danish Air Force; Home Guard
- Headquarters: Holmen Naval Base, Copenhagen, Denmark
- Website: Official Website

Leadership
- Monarch (Note: Under the current Constitution of Denmark, the role of the Danish monarch as commander-in-chief is implicit; the constitution does not explicitly state that the monarch is the commander-in-chief. It is also of important note that in modern Danish legal parlance, most jurists interpret references to the King in the constitution as to be interpreted as references to the government (consisting of the Prime Minister and other ministers). For more, see Commander-in-chief § Denmark.): (Danish Realm) Frederik X
- Prime Minister: (Danish Realm) Mette Frederiksen
- Minister of Defence: Jeppe Bruus
- Chief of Defence: General Michael Hyldgaard

Personnel
- Military age: 18 for voluntary service
- Conscription: Yes
- Active personnel: 16,602 military & 8,144 civilian (2024)
- Reserve personnel: 12,000 + 51,000 volunteers in the Home Guard
- Deployed personnel: 800 (2024)

Expenditure
- Budget: DKK 105 billion (2026) (€14 billion)
- Percent of GDP: 3,5% (2026)

Related articles
- History: Military history of Denmark
- Ranks: Military ranks

The Danish Defence (Danish: Forsvaret, lit. 'the Defence' (Note: Faroese: Danska verjan; Greenlandic: Illersuisut)), commonly known as the Danish Armed Forces, is the unified armed forces of the Kingdom of Denmark charged with the defence of Denmark and its self-governing territories Greenland and the Faroe Islands. The military also promotes Denmark's wider interests, support international peacekeeping efforts and provide humanitarian aid.

Since the creation of a standing military in 1510, the military has seen action in many wars, most involving Sweden, but also involving the world's great powers, including the Thirty Years' War, the Great Northern War, and the Napoleonic Wars.

Today, the armed forces consists of: the Royal Danish Army, Denmark's principal land warfare branch; the Royal Danish Navy, with a fleet of 20 commissioned ships; and the Royal Danish Air Force, an air force with an operational fleet consisting of both fixed-wing and rotary aircraft. The Defence also includes the Home Guard. Under the Danish Defence Law the Minister of Defence serves as the commander of Danish Defence (through the Chief of Defence and the Defence Command) and the Danish Home Guard (through the Home Guard Command). De facto the Danish Cabinet is the commanding authority of the Defence, though it cannot mobilize the armed forces, for purposes that are not strictly defence oriented, without the consent of parliament.

== History ==
=== Origins ===
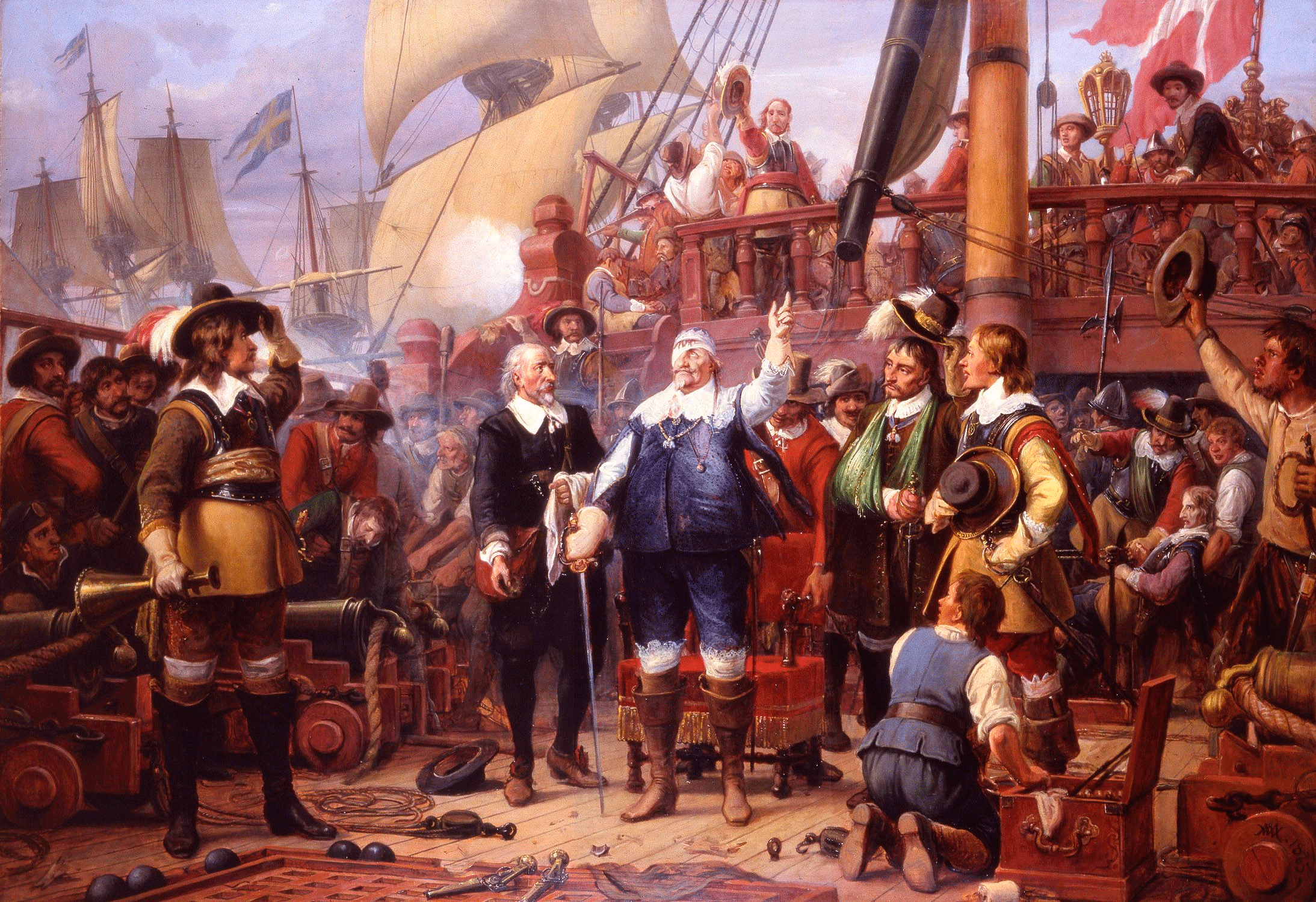
Christian IV of Denmark on the warship Trefoldigheden during the Battle of Colberger Heide in 1644

The modern Danish military can be traced back to 1510, with the creation of the permanent Royal Danish Navy. During this time, the Danish Kingdom held considerable territories, including Schleswig-Holstein, Norway, and colonies in Africa and the Americas.

Following the defeat in the Second Schleswig War, the military became a political hot-button issue. Denmark managed to maintain its neutrality during the First World War, with a relative strong military force. However, following the Interwar period, a more pacifistic government came to power, decreasing the size of the military. This resulted in Denmark having a limited military, when Denmark was invaded in 1940.

Denmark tried to remain neutral after World War II, with the proposed Scandinavian defence union. However, Norway resigned from the talks, and with Cold War tensions on the rise and the 1948 Easter Crisis, Denmark was forced to join the North Atlantic Treaty.

Since the establishment of the Danish military, the two branches operated independently, without much cooperation. They both had their own ministry, and their own air force. The first proposal for unified ministry came in the 1870s, and proposal for a unified command came in 1928, when Hjalmar Rechnitzer suggested an independent air force, with all three branches collected under a central Rigsværn (transl. Realm Defence). In 1946, a political commission was established to explore how to rebuild the military and establish an independent air force. The placement of the new air force, created issues, as both existing ministries wanted ownership. This along with the lessons of joint operations in World War II, the branches were reorganized and collected under the newly created Danish Defence and new ministry in 1950.

=== Cold War ===
Receiving Military aid from the United States, Denmark began rebuilding its military. During this time Denmark participated in a number of UN peacekeeping missions including UNEF and UNFICYP.

=== Post-cold war and international engagements ===
Following the end of the Cold War, Denmark began a more active foreign policy, deciding to participate in international operations. This began with the participation in the Bosnian War, where the Royal Danish Army served as part of the United Nations Protection Force and was involved in two skirmishes. This was the first time the Danish Army was a part of a combat operation since World War 2. On 29 April 1994, the Royal Danish Army, while on an operation to relieve an observation post as part of the United Nations Protection Force, the Jutland Dragoon Regiment came under artillery fire from the town of Kalesija. The United Nations Protection Force quickly returned fire and eliminated the artillery positions. On 24 October 1994, the Royal Danish Army, while on an operation to reinforce an observation post in the town of Gradačac, were fired upon by a T-55 Bosnian Serb tank. One of the three Danish Leopard 1 tanks experienced slight damage, but all returned fired and put the T-55 tank out of action.

With the September 11 attacks, Denmark joined US forces in the war on terror, participating in both the War in Afghanistan and the Iraq War. In Afghanistan, 37 soldiers have been killed in various hostile engagements or as a result of friendly fire, and 6 have been killed in non-combat related incidents, bringing the number of Danish fatalities to 43, being the highest loss per capita within the coalition forces. Denmark has since participated in Operation Ocean Shield, the 2011 military intervention in Libya and the American-led intervention in the Syrian Civil War.

U.S. President Donald Trump announced in January 2025 that he wanted to "buy" Greenland and express claims to the area belonging to Denmark. Danish politicians decided to significantly increase the military presence in Greenland and invest almost two billion euros to increase security in the strategically important Arctic region. The Ministry of Defense is planning three new ships for the Danish Arctic Navy (MPV80-class vessels), two additional long-range drones and satellites for better surveillance.

== Purpose and task ==
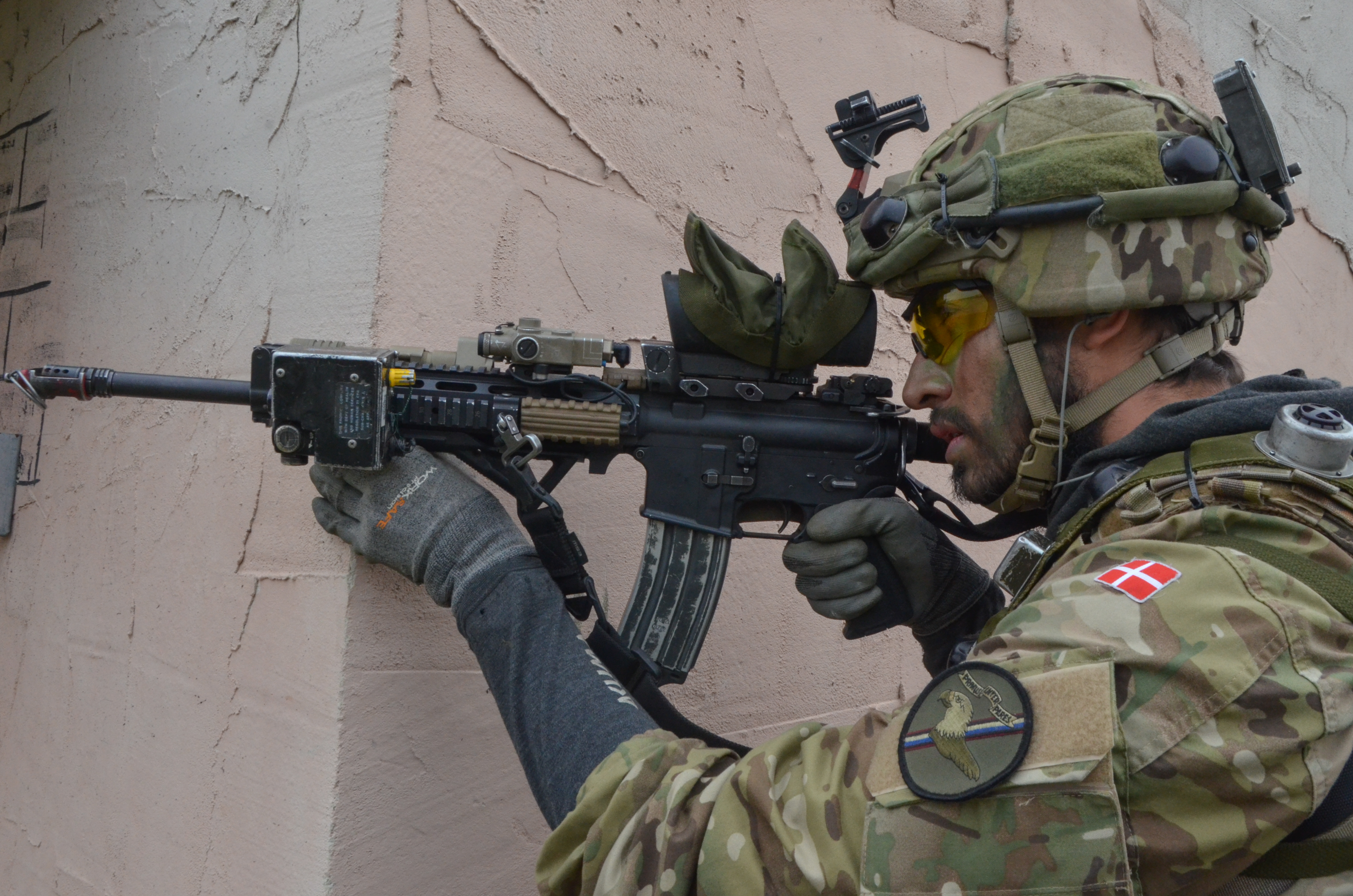
A Danish soldier at Combined Resolve III, 2014

The purpose of the Danish Defence is to prevent conflicts and war, preserve the sovereignty of Denmark, secure the continuing existence and integrity of the independent Kingdom of Denmark and further a peaceful development in the world with respect to human rights. This is defined in Law no. 122 of 27 February 2001 which took effect 1 March 2001.

Its primary tasks are: NATO participation in accordance with the strategy of the alliance, detect and repel any sovereignty violation of Danish territory (including Greenland and the Faroe Islands), defence cooperation with non-NATO members, especially Central and East European countries, international missions in the area of conflict prevention, crisis-control, humanitarian, peacemaking, peacekeeping, participation in Total Defence in cooperation with civilian resources and finally maintenance of a sizable force to execute these tasks at all times.

=== Total defence ===
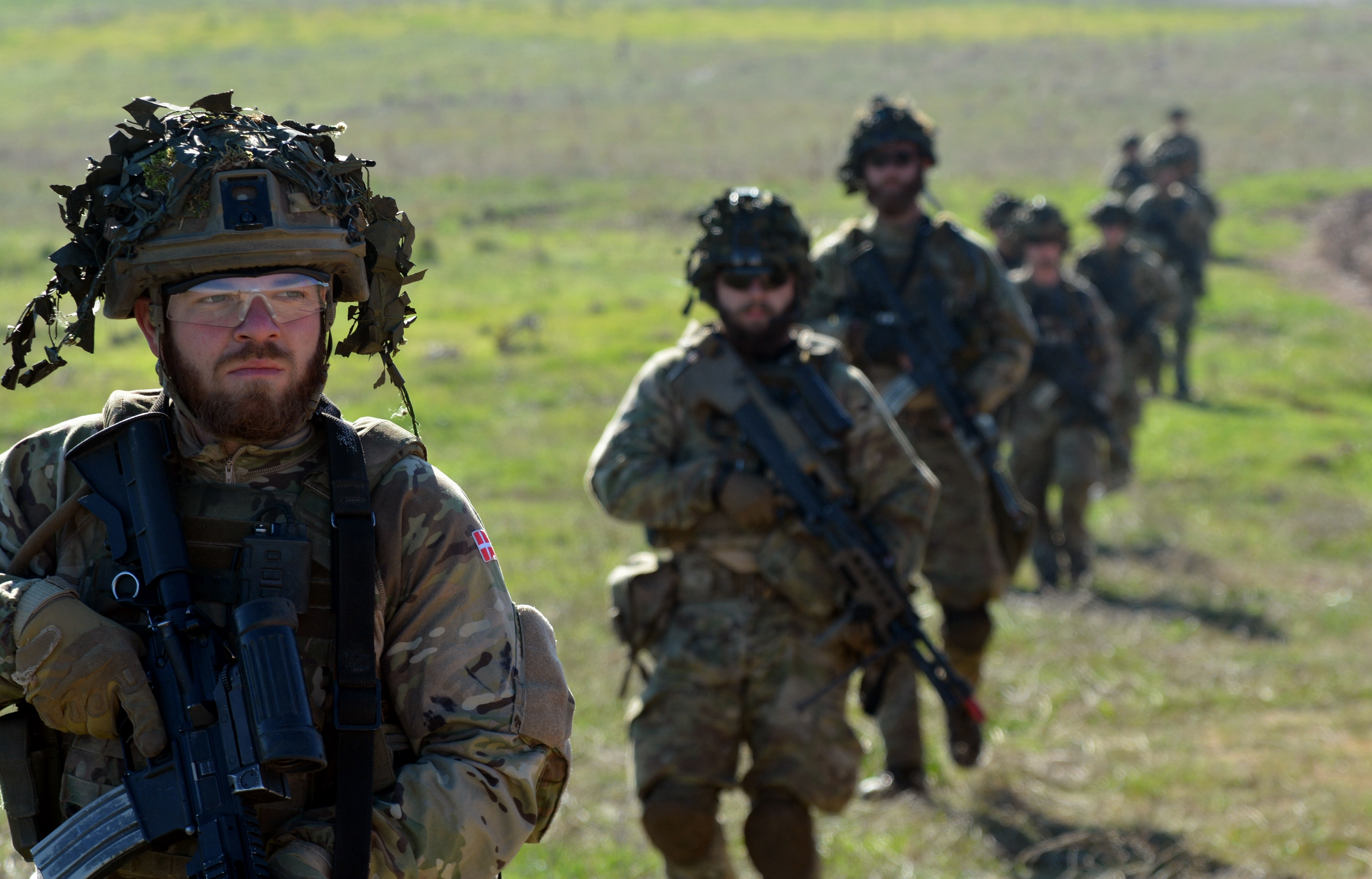
Danish soldiers on patrol at the Chinchilla training area, Spain, during NATO exercise Trident Juncture 15

Total Defence (Danish: Totalforsvaret) is "the use of all resources in order to maintain an organized and functional society, and to protect the population and values of society". This is achieved by combining the military, Home Guard, Danish Emergency Management Agency and elements of the police. The concept of total defence was created following World War II, where it was clear that the defence of the country could not only rely on the military, but there also need to be other measures to ensure a continuation of society. As a part of the Total Defence, all former conscripts can be recalled to duty, in order to serve in cases of emergency.

== Defence budget ==
Since 1988, Danish defence budgets and security policy have been set by multi-year white paper agreements supported by a wide parliamentary majority including government and opposition parties. However, public opposition to increases in defence spending—during periods of economic constraints require reduced spending for social welfare – has created differences among the political parties regarding a broadly acceptable level of new defence expenditure.

The Defence agreement ("Defence Agreement 2018–23") was signed 28 January 2018, and calls for an increase in spending, cyber security and capabilities to act in international operations and international stabilization efforts. The reaction speed is increased, with an entire brigade on standby readiness; the military retains the capability to continually deploy 2,000 soldiers in international service or 5,000 over a short time span. The standard mandatory conscription is expanded to include 500 more, with some of these having a longer service time, with more focus on national challenges.

In 2024, after more than a decade of significant cuts in defense spending, the Danish government allocated around 25.5 billion euros for its military over a period until 2034, part of which is earmarked for the Arctic.

=== Expenditures ===
In 2006 the Danish military budget was the fifth largest single portion of the Danish Government's total budget, significantly less than that of the Ministry of Social Affairs (≈110 billion DKK), Ministry of Employment (≈67 billion DKK), Ministry of the Interior and Health (≈66 billion DKK) and Ministry of Education (≈30 billion DKK) and only slightly larger than that of the Ministry of Science, Technology and Innovation (≈14 billion DKK). This list lists the complete expenditures for the Danish Ministry of Defence.

The Danish Defence Force, counting all branches and all departments, itself has an income equal to about 1–5% of its expenditures, depending on the year. They are not deducted in this listing.

Approximately 95% of the budget goes directly to running the Danish military including the Home guard. Depending on year, 50–53% accounts for payment to personnel, roughly 14–21% on acquiring new material, 2–8% for larger ships, building projects or infrastructure and about 24–27% on other items, including purchasing of goods, renting, maintenance, services and taxes.

The remaining 5% is special expenditures to NATO, branch shared expenditures, special services and civil structures, here in including running the Danish Maritime Safety Administration, Danish Emergency Management Agency and the Administration of Conscientious Objectors.

Because Denmark has a small and highly specialized military industry, the vast majority of Danish Defence's equipment is imported from NATO and the Nordic countries.

==== Yearly data ====
There are significant differences between the Danish method and the NATO method of calculating defense budgets (among others due to what can be included), with the former resulting in a considerably lower numbers than the latter. For example, according to the Danish method, the expenditures in 2024 was DKK 36.16 billion, but according to the NATO method it was DKK 68.67 billion. Using the NATO method, it has consistently increased in the last decade, with the budget tripling from 2014 to 2024 (DKK 22.77 to 68.67 billion) and the percentage doubling (1.15 to 2.37%). The following all use the Danish method:

Danish Defence expenditures (1949–1989)

	1940s	1950s										1960s										1970s										1980s									
	49	50	51	52	53	54	55	56	57	58	59	60	61	62	63	64	65	66	67	68	69	70	71	72	73	74	75	76	77	78	79	80	81	82	83	84	85	86	87	88	89
Total Budget (Billions) Kr.	0.36	0.36	0.48	0.68	0.89	0.89	0.92	0.94	1.01	0.99	0.99	1.11	1.18	1.55	1.65	1.76	1.97	2.08	2.25	2.60	2.64	2.97	3.20	3.39	3.52	4.46	5.36	5.71	6.38	7.29	8.05	9.12	10.30	11.67	12.57	13.05	13.34	13.33	14.65	15.62	15.96
Percentage of GNP	2.0	1.7	2.1	2.7	3.4	3.2	3.2	3.0	3.1	2.9	2.6	2.7	1.6	3.0	3.0	2.8	2.8	2.6	2.6	2.7	2.4	2.4	2.4	2.2	2.0	2.2	2.4	2.2	2.2	2.3	2.3	2.4	2.4	2.4	2.4	2.2	2.1	1.9	2.0	2.1	2.0
Defence Spending % Change		-0.3	+0.4	+0.6	+0.7	-0.2	0.0	-0.2	+0.1	-0.2	-0.3	+0.1	-0.9	+1.4	0.0	-0.2	0.0	-0.2	0.0	+0.1	-0.3	0.0	0.0	-0.2	-0.2	+0.2	+0.2	-0.2	0.0	+0.1	0.0	+0.1	0.0	0.0	0.0	-0.2	-0.1	-0.2	+0.1	+0.1	-0.1

Danish Defence expenditures (1990–)

	1990s										2000s										2010s										2020s						
	90	91	92	93	94	95	96	97	98	99	00	01	02	03	04	05	06	07	08	09	10	11	12	13	14	15	16	17	18	19	20	21	22	23	24	25	26
Total Budget (Billions) Kr.	16.4	17.09	17.13	17.39	17.29	17.47	17.90	18.52	19.07	19.43	19.34	21.02	21.27	21.08	21.44	20.80	23.17	22.73	24.41	23.25	25.33	24.26	25.62	23.72	25.02	22.633	24.190	24.9	28.7	29.9	31.9	33.1	38.7	56.0	68.6	98	
Percentage of GNP	2.0	2.0	1.9	1.9	1.8	1.7	1.7	1.6	1.6	1.6	1.5	1.6	1.5	1.5	1.5	1.3	1.4	1.3	1.4	1.4	1.4	1.4	1.4	1.3	1.3	1.11	1.15	1.14	1.28	1.30	1.38	1.30	1.37	2.0	2.37	3.2	
Defence Spending % Change	0.0	0.0	-0.1	0.0	-0.1	-0.1	0.0	-0.1	0.0.	0.0	-0.1	+0.1	-0.1	0.0.	0.0	-0.2	+0.1	-0.1	+0.1	0.0	0.0	0.0	0.0	-0.1	0.0	-0.19	+0.05	-0.01	+0.14	+0.02	+0.08	-0.08	+0.07	+0.63	+0.37	+0,83	

View source data.

== Branches ==
=== Royal Danish Army ===
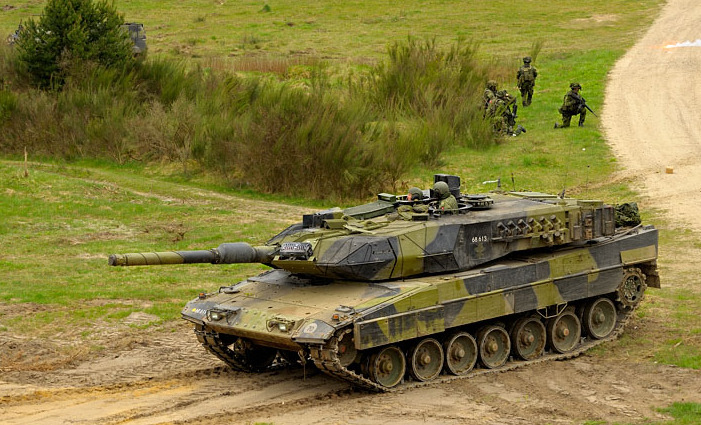
Leopard 2 battle tank

The Danish Royal Army (Danish: Hæren) consists of 2 brigades, organised into 3 regiments, and a number of support centres, all commanded through the Army Staff. The army is a mixture of Mechanized infantry and Armoured cavalry with limited capabilities in Armoured warfare.

The army also provides protection for the Danish royal family, in the form of the Royal Guard Company and the Guard Hussar Regiment Mounted Squadron.

=== Royal Danish Navy ===
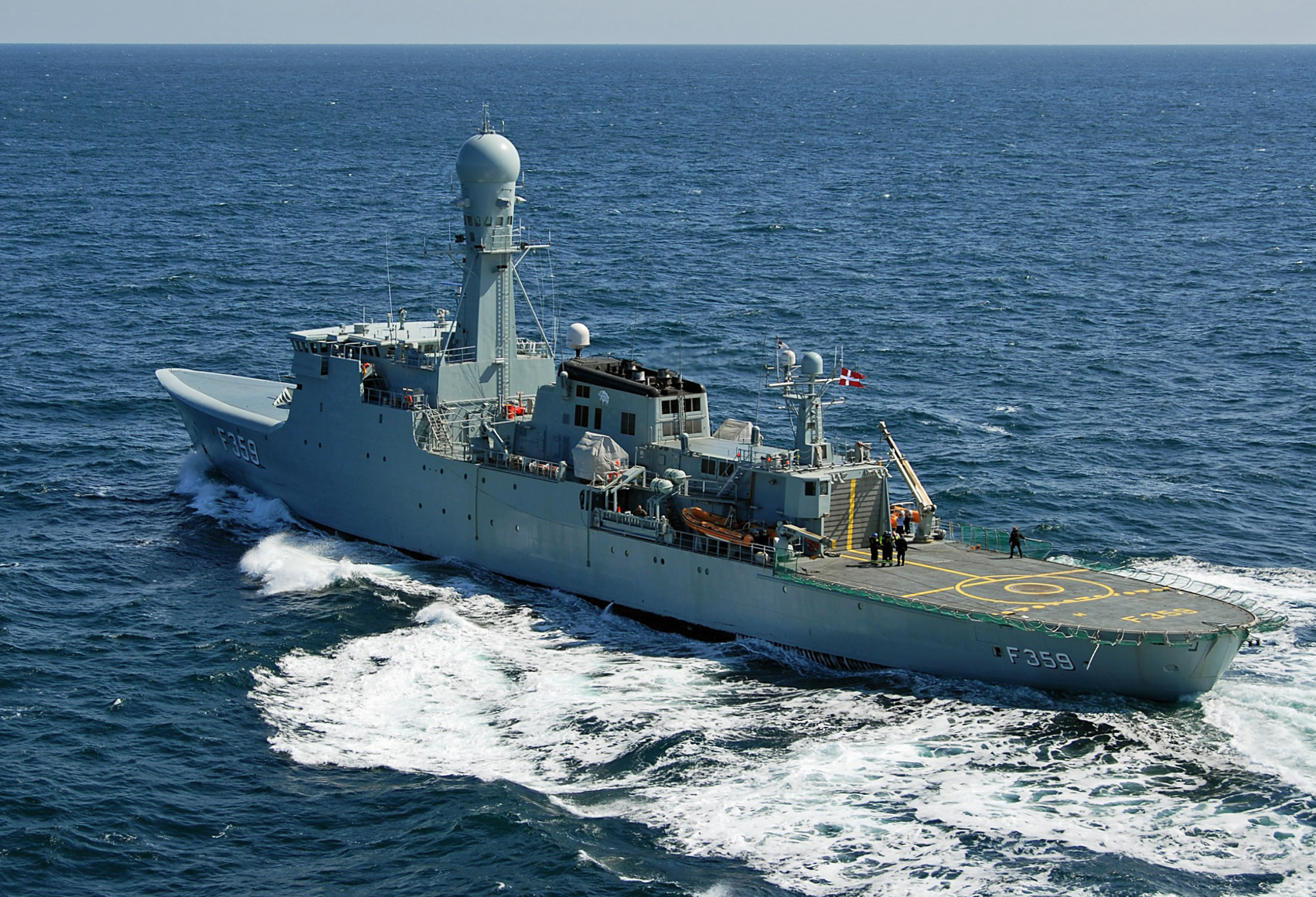
Vædderen, a Thetis-class patrol vessel

The Royal Danish Navy (Danish: Søværnet) consists of frigates, patrol vessels, mine-countermeasure vessels, and other miscellaneous vessels, many of which are issued with the modular mission payload system StanFlex. The navy's chief responsibility is maritime defence and maintaining the sovereignty of Danish, Greenlandic and Faroese territorial waters.

A submarine service existed within the Royal Danish Navy for 95 years.

=== Royal Danish Air Force ===
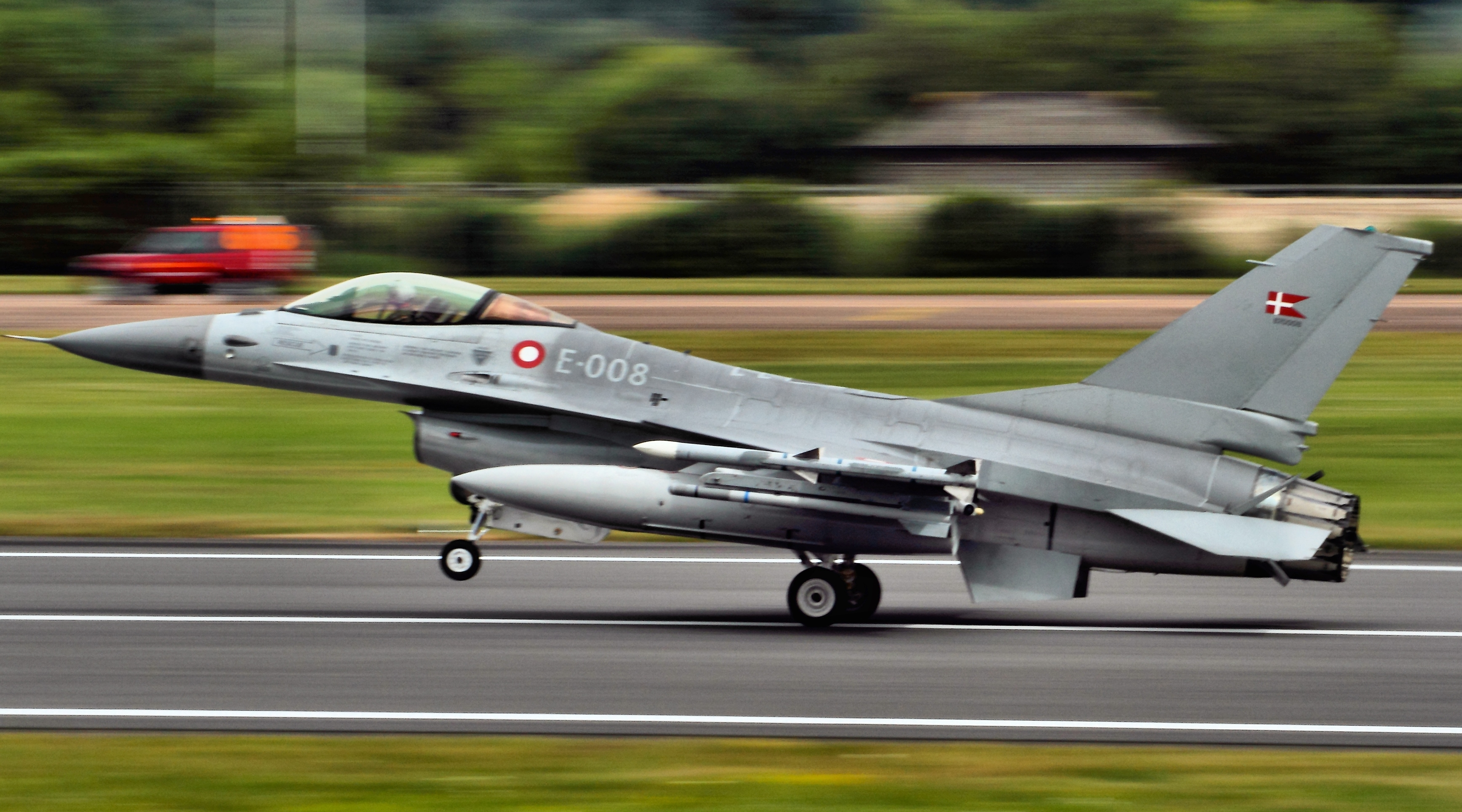
A RDAF F-16AM

The Royal Danish Air Force (Danish: Flyvevåbnet) consists of both fixed-wing and rotary aircraft.

=== Danish Home Guard ===
The Home Guard is voluntary service responsible for defence of the country, but has since 2008 also supported the army, in Afghanistan and Kosovo.

== Structure ==
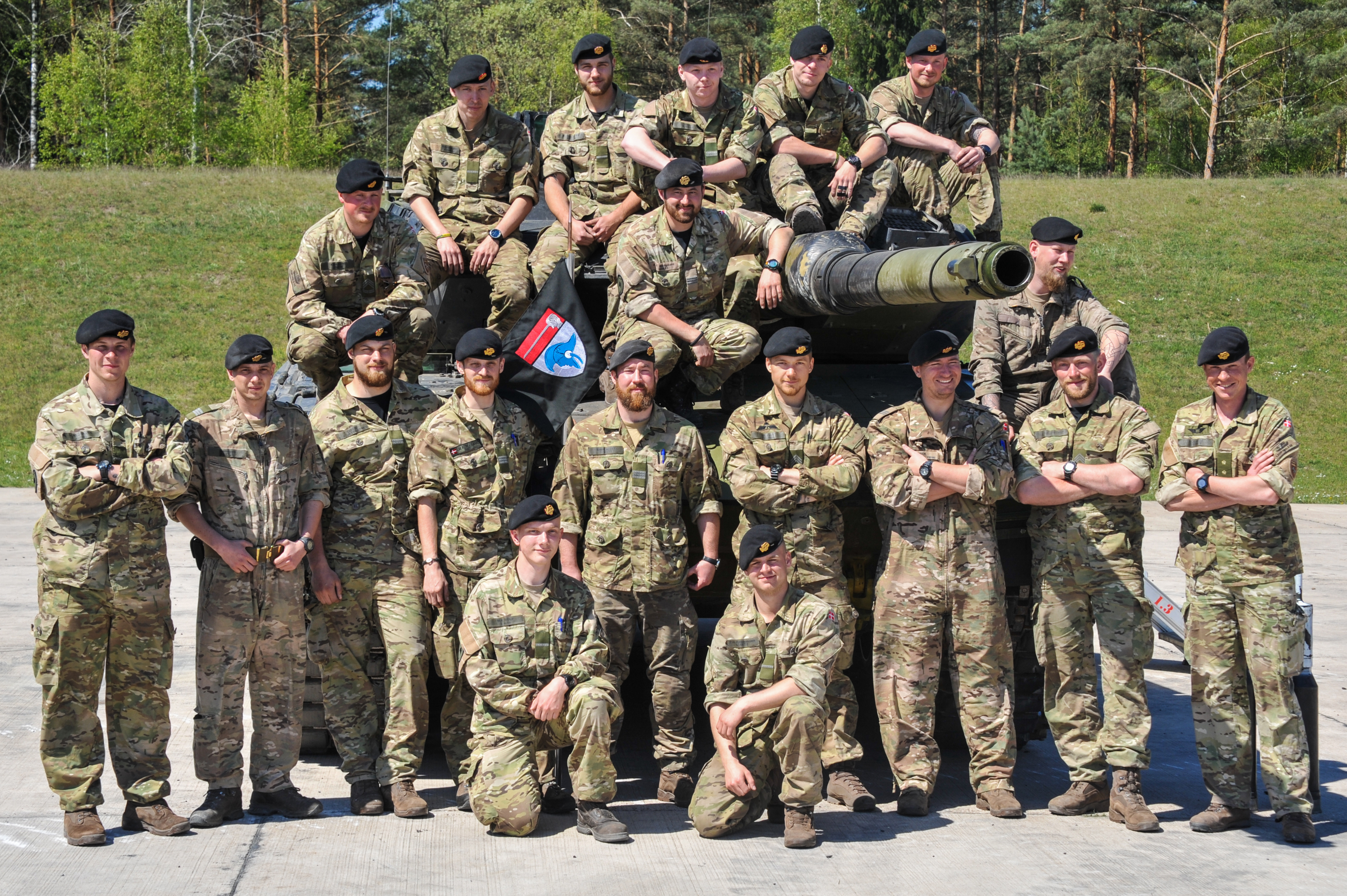
Danish crew from the Jutland Dragoon Regiment during the 2016 Strong Europe Tank Challenge

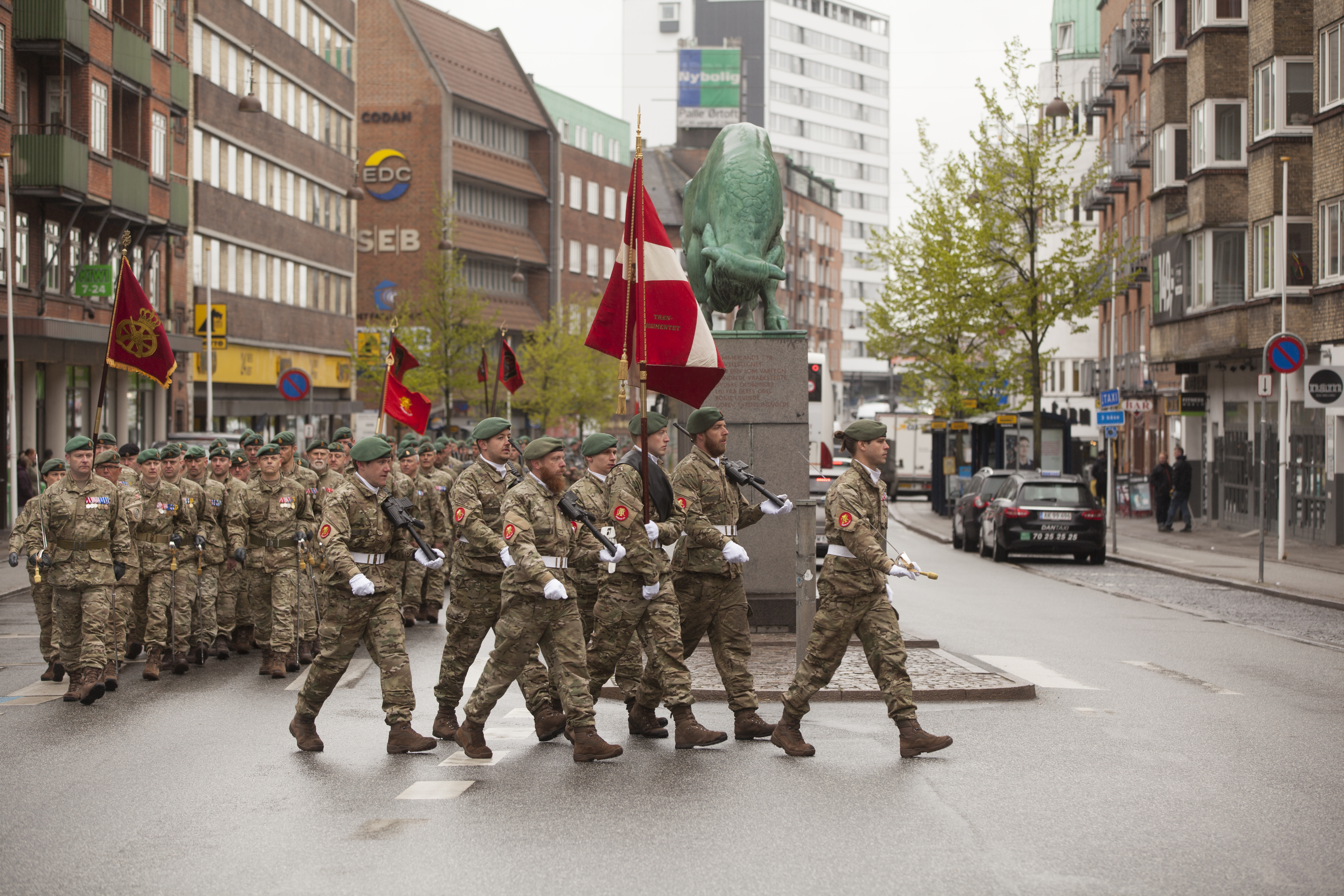
Logistic Regiment personnel, 2017

- Danish Defence
  - Defence Command
    - Defence Staff
    - Army Command
      - Royal Danish Army
    - Royal Danish Navy Command
      - Royal Danish Navy
    - Air Command Denmark
      - Royal Danish Air Force
    - Special Operations Command (SOKOM)
      - Jaeger Corps
      - Frogman Corps
      - Sirius Dog Sled Patrol
    - Joint Arctic Command
    - Operational Support Command
      - Defence Medical Command
      - Defence Maintenance Service
  - Royal Danish Defence College
    - Royal Danish Military Academy
      - Army NCO School
    - Royal Danish Naval Academy
      - Naval NCO School
    - Royal Danish Air Force Academy
      - Air Force NCO School
    - Royal Danish Defence Language Academy
  - Personnel Command
  - Estate Command

== Operations ==
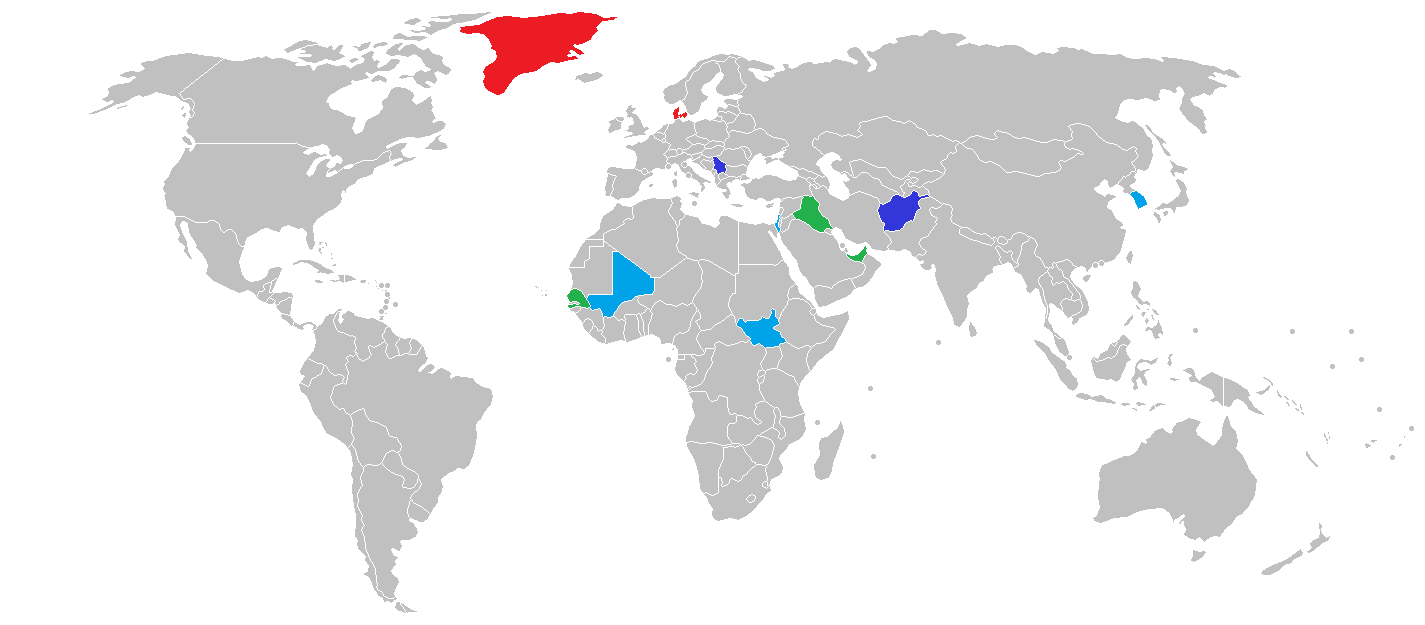
Red: national, light blue: UN, dark blue: NATO, green: coalitions

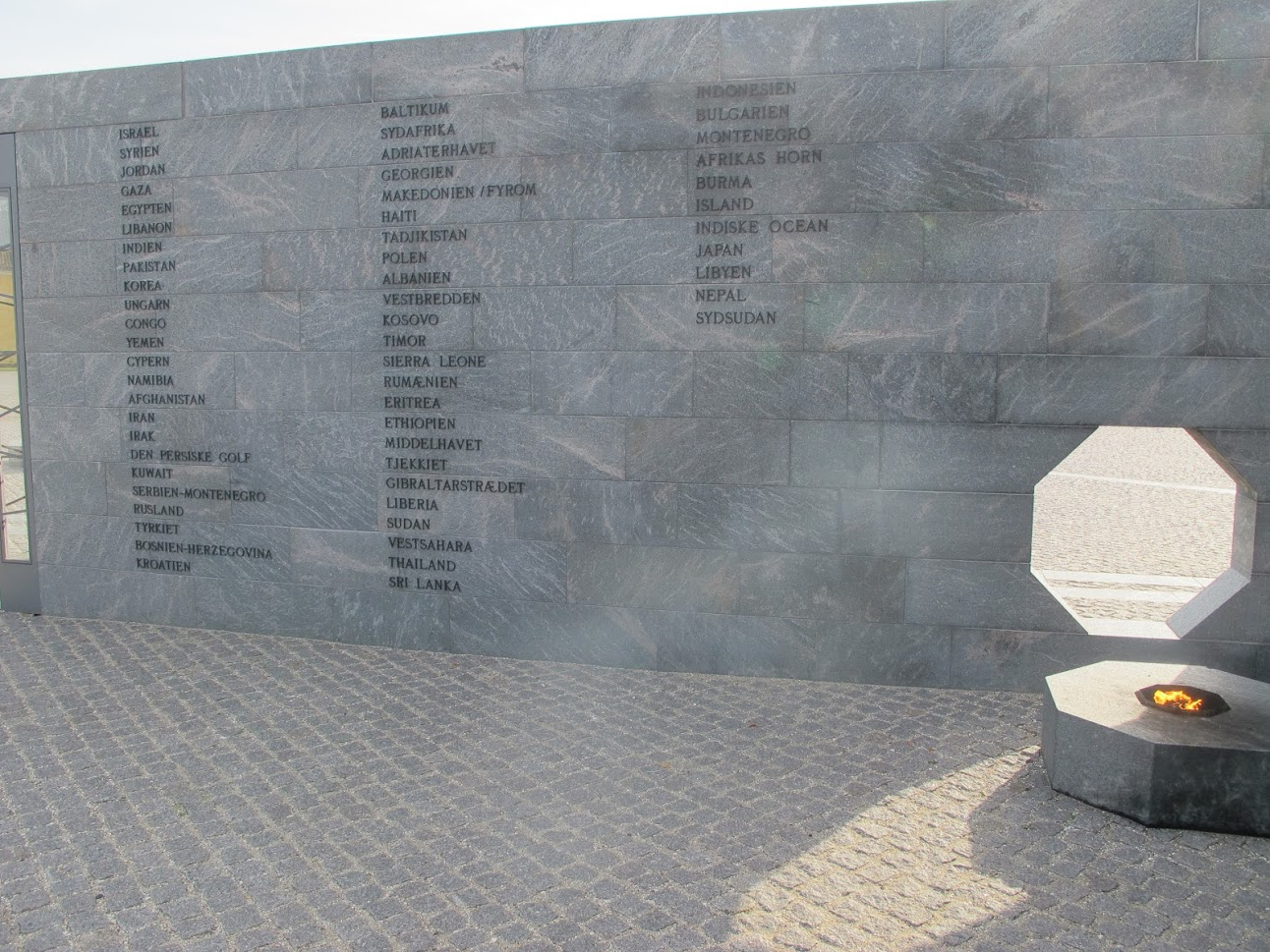
Memorial to Danish overseas military deployments in Kastellet, Copenhagen

Current deployment of Danish forces, per 10 March 2016:

=== NATO ===
- A Challenger CL-604 MMA for maritime patrol in the Baltic Sea as part of NATO Allied Maritime Command.
- 35 soldiers in Kosovo participating in NATO's Kosovo Force, guarding the French Camp Marechal De Lattre de Tassigny.
- 97 people in Afghanistan as part of Resolute Support Mission.
- HDMS Absalon patrolling the Aegean Sea for human trafficking (September 2016).

=== UN ===
- 20 people in Bamako and Gao, as part of MINUSMA.
- 13 people in Juba, as part of UNMISS.
- 11 people in Israel, as part of UNTSO.
- 2 people in South Korea, as part of UNCMAC.

=== National Missions ===
- 12 men on the Sirius Patrol of Eastern Greenland.
- A Challenger CL-604 MMA to fly patrol over Greenland.
- Rota between HDMS Lauge Koch, HDMS Knud Rasmussen, HDMS Triton and HDMS Thetis to enact sovereignty patrol in the seas of Greenland and Faroe Islands.
- A Challenger CL-604 MMA to do maritime environmental monitoring missions in the North Sea.

=== Coalitions ===
- 149 people at Al Asad Airbase in Iraq to train the local military as part of Operation Inherent Resolve.
- 8 people operating radars as part of the radar element in Operation Inherent Resolve.
- 20 people in UAE as part of the operator element in Operation Inherent Resolve.
- Unknown number of Danish special forces in Senegal to train the local special forces as part of Flintlock 2016.

== Personnel ==
=== Women in the military ===
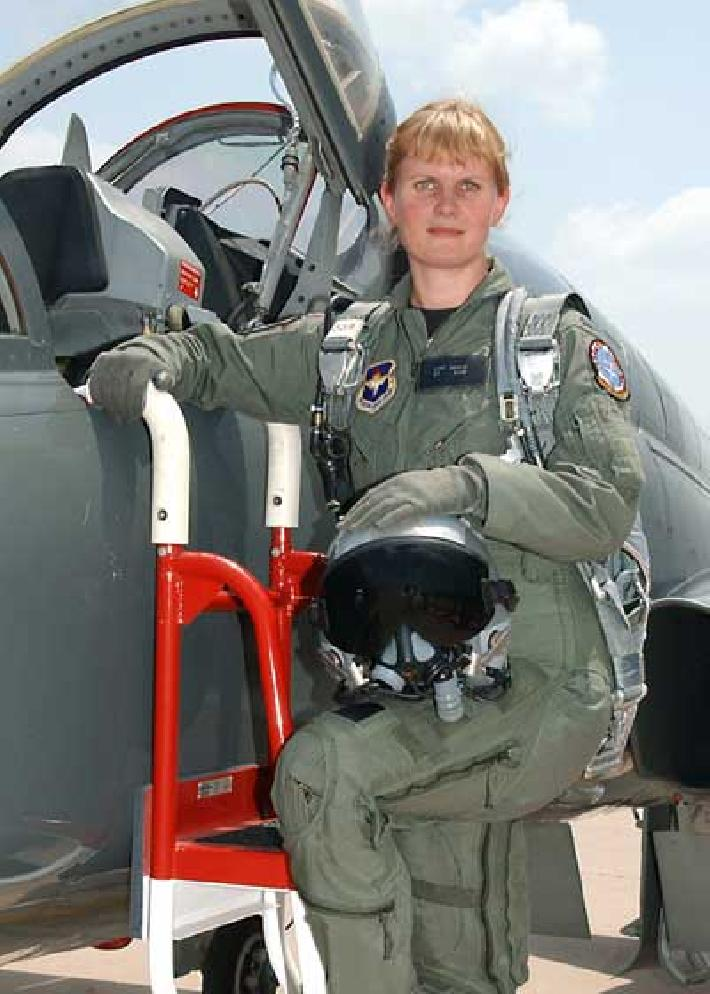
Lt. Line Bonde, the first female fighter pilot in the Royal Danish Air Force

Women in the military can be traced back to 1946, with the creation of Lottekorpset. This corps allowed women to serve, however, without entering with the normal armed forces, and they were not allowed to carry weapons. In 1962, women were allowed in the military.

Currently 1,122 or 7.3% of all personnel in the armed forces are women. Women do not have to serve conscription in Denmark, since 1998, it is however possible to serve under conscription-like circumstances; 17% of those serving conscription or conscription-like are women. Between 1991 and 31 December 2017, 1,965 women have been deployed to different international missions. Of those 3 women have lost their lives. In 1998, Police Constable Gitte Larsen was killed in Hebron on the West Bank. In 2003, Overkonstabel Susanne Lauritzen was killed in a traffic accident in Kosovo. In 2010, the first woman was killed in a combat situation, when Konstabel Sophia Bruun was killed by an IED in Afghanistan.

In 2005, Line Bonde became the first female fighter pilot in Denmark. In 2016, Lone Træholt became the first female general. She was the only female general in the Danish armed forces until the army promoted Jette Albinus to the rank of brigadier general on 11 September 2017.

In May 2018, the Royal Life Guards was forced to lower the height requirements for women, as the Danish Institute of Human Rights decided the requirements were discriminatory. On 1 July 2025, women were given same conscription conditions as men.

=== Conscription ===
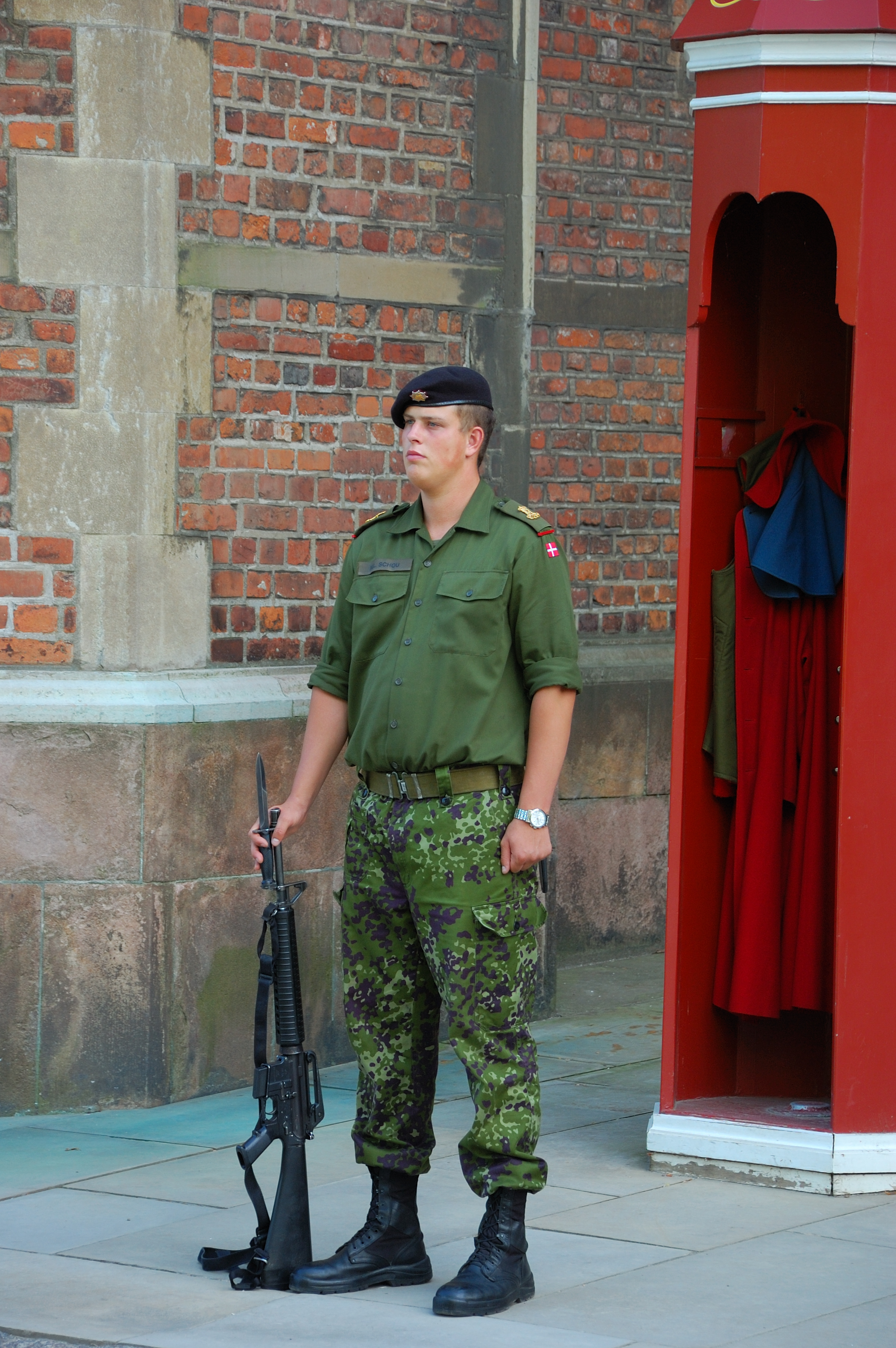
A conscript from the Royal Life Guards standing guard at Rosenborg Castle

Technically all Danish 18-year-old males are conscripts (37,897 in 2010, of whom 53% were considered suitable for duty). Due to the large number of volunteers, 96-99% of the number required in the past three years, the number of men actually called up is relatively low (4,200 in 2012). There were additionally 567 female volunteers in 2010, who pass training on "conscript-like" conditions. Universal conscription of women under a lottery system went into effect in 2025.

Since 2026, conscripts to Danish Defence (army, navy and air force) generally serve 11 months, except:

- Conscripts of the Guard Hussar Regiment Mounted Squadron, Royal Life Guards, with Cyber-conscription, or aboard the Royal Yacht Dannebrog serve 12 months.
- Conscripts in the Danish Emergency Management Agency serve nine months.

There has been a right of conscientious objection since 1917.

== See also ==
- Danish Defence Media Agency
- Military history of Denmark
- Military in Greenland
- NATO
- Scandinavian defence union
