= Guard Hussar Regiment Mounted Squadron =

- Gardehusarregimentets Hesteskadron
- Mounted Squadron's logo
- Active: 10 February 1762 – present (264 years, 8 months)
- Country: Denmark
- Branch: Royal Danish Army
- Type: Hussar
- Role: Public duties/ceremonial
- Size: 2 Troops
- Part of: Guard Hussar Regiment
- Garrison/HQ: Antvorskov barracks
- Nickname: HESK
- Patron: King Frederik
- Motto: In Actis Esto Volucris (Be swift in action)
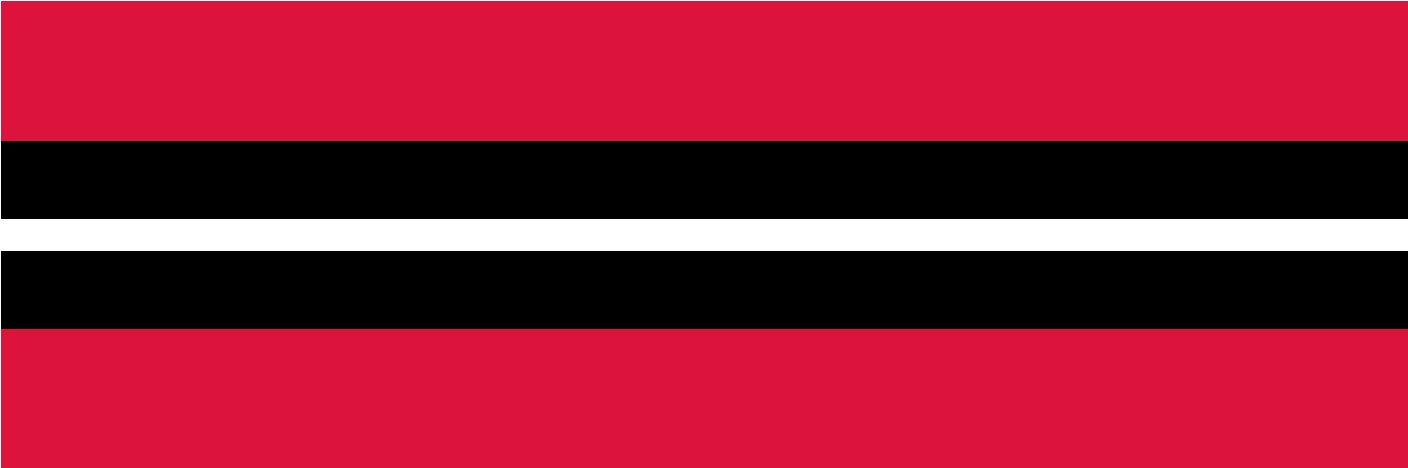
- Regimental belt
- March: Gardehusarregimentets Signalmarch
- Website: Official Website

Commanders
- Current commander: Major Christian Skovsbøll Eilschou Holm
- Ceremonial chief: HM The King of Denmark
- Colonel of the Regiment: Jens Ole Rossen-Jørgensen
- Notable commanders: Major Michael Mentz; Casper Persson de Renouard

Insignia
- Standards

The Guard Hussar Regiment Mounted Squadron (Danish: Gardehusarregimentets Hesteskadron, HESK), is part of the Guard Hussar Regiment of the Royal Danish Army.

The squadron provides mounted escorts for the Danish royal family and carries out ceremonial services with the Royal Danish Army. The squadron commands 75 horses, 18 officers and NCOs, and 75-100 conscripts. In addition it has a saddler, music-teacher, veterinarian, remount service and a farrier.

== History ==
In 1762, there was a possibility of war between Denmark and Russia. The general staff was wary of the coming battle, due to the Cossacks, and Denmark's inability to counter the light cavalry. Inspired by the Hungarian hussars, Denmark created their own hussar regiment and adopted a similar uniform.

== Conscription ==
The conscripts serve for 1 year, the longest time for a conscript in Denmark, with two troops starting each year, in February and August. It is also the only place where conscripts are issued silver monograms, all others regiments being issued brass monograms, of either the King or Queen. They will normally have 3–4 months of basic military training, before moving on to stable duty, where they learn basic stable duty, basic horseback riding, escort and show training, and music lessons. Each Wednesday the conscripts will practice escorts, by riding through the town of Slagelse, this is also to prepare the horses for moving amongst traffic.

The Mounted Squadron is responsible for the execution of the Army Cavalry Badge test. The badge is awarded to soldiers who have completed the Squadron's riding training, and have subsequently served as riders in a royal escort.

== Uniform ==
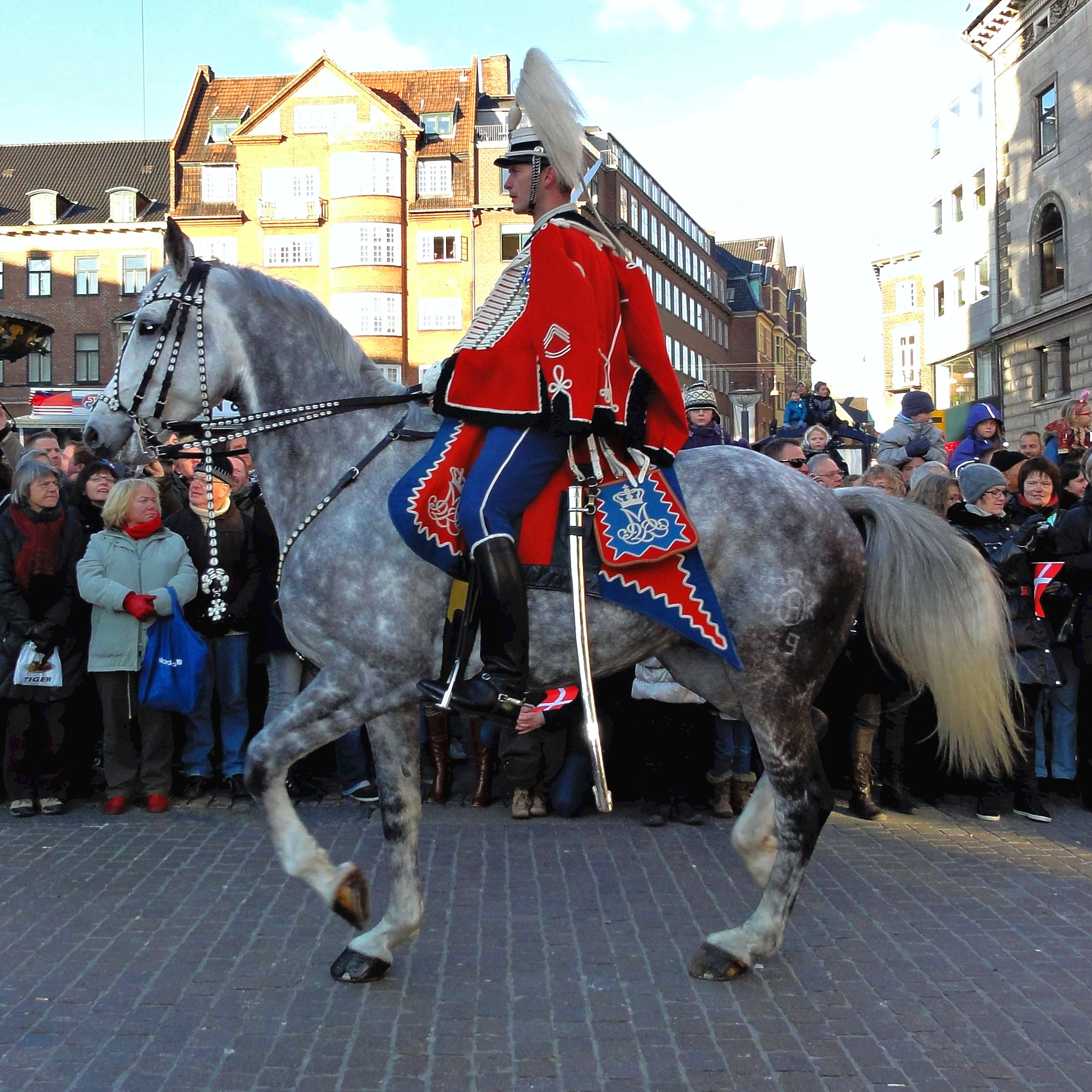
A Guard Hussar in mounted parade uniform, including the red pelisse, sabretache and shabraque

The current ceremonial uniform of the Guard Hussar Regiment dates from 1870. It contains:

- A Blue Dolman: The original dolman was replaced in 1870, with a simplified version that has fewer braids across the chest.
- A Red Pelisse (jacket): The pelisse was introduced in 1762. With the introduction of the new dolman in 1870, the pelisse was removed from the uniform. It was, however, possible to wear the old ones until they were worn out. King Edward VII of the United Kingdom suggested to reintroduce the pelisse, but only for officers who had to buy them privately in either case. The pelisse for NCOs and privates from before 1870, are said to still being "worn out" and are therefore still used today. Both versions of the pelisse are provided with lanyards used for holding the pelisse in place, when worn from the left shoulder. These lanyards are called mantequets. Officers wear Cardinal red, where NCOs and enlisted wear Crimson red. This is the only hussar regiment in the world to still use this distinctive garment.
- Blue Riding Breeches: The current light blue breeches with a white stripe along the outseam were introduced in 1822. The original breeches in 1762 were also light blue, but between 1774 and 1822 different colours were used, yellow were however most common.
- A Hessian boot
- A sabretache (pouch): In the colours of the regiment, with the royal monogram. It is the only uniform in the world to still use it, and has been in use since Frederick V.
- A shako with a cordon and pompom made of tail hairs for NCOs and enlisted, officers have white buffalohair. There are two colours for pompoms, red for the Bugle Corps while the rest have white.
- A shabraque (saddlecloth): In the colours of the regiment, with the royal monogram. It remains mostly unchanged since 1762 for troopers, but officers used a different design during the Napoleonic Wars.
- A Bridle: The bridle has cowries woven into it. It was meant to make the horse look like a skeleton, but also to protect the horse from sabre cuts and to signify wealth. It was first introduced in 1787, but it is not clear if it was initially limited to the 'Bosnic' lancer squadron as images from the period show unadorned tack.
