= Sophia Bruun =

First Danish female soldier killed in action

Sophia Bruun (3 December 1987 – 1 June 2010) was a Danish soldier. She was killed on 1 June 2010 while on duty in Afghanistan, she was the first Danish woman soldier ever to be killed in action.

Bruun was killed at midday on 1 June while manning a machine gun on an armoured Piranha patrol vehicle when it suffered a road-side bomb explosion. The incident took place 6 km (4 miles) north-east of Girishk in Helmand Province. Bruun had served as a dedicated soldier, performing professionally in emergencies. In May 2010, she had helped overcome an attack by maintaining her position as a gunner and providing first aid to the wounded. Always ready to help, she had volunteered to serve at Patrol Base Clifton.

According to Lars Bangert Struwe of the Danish Center for Military Studies (Center for Militære Studier), Danish women were being assigned to the same areas of conflict in Afghanistan as men, with the same responsibilities. It was therefore not surprising that a woman should die there.

It was the first time a Danish woman soldier had died in action although a female lance corporal died in a traffic accident in Kosovo in 2003.
