= Scandinavian defence union =

Failed post-WWII Nordic military alliance plan

The Scandinavian defence union was a historical idea to establish a military alliance between Sweden, Norway, Denmark and Finland (although not a Scandinavian country) after the end of World War II, but the idea did not come about when Denmark, Iceland and Norway joined NATO in 1949 at the request of the United States, while Finland and Sweden then did not.

Historically, Finland had fought two wars against the Soviet Union, Denmark and Norway had been occupied by Germany between 1940 and 1945, and Sweden, having been a neutral state throughout the war, had still felt the effects on either side.

In the 2000s, military cooperation between the Nordic nations increased, especially through Nordefco. It has generally not been regarded as a mutual defence union, but since the 2010s an increasing number of defence agreements were implemented. In 2022, Finland and Sweden requested to join NATO.

The governments of the three Nordic NATO members released statements saying that they would use all necessary means in the defence of Finland and Sweden if they were attacked before they became members. Finland became a member of NATO on 4 April 2023 and Sweden on 7 March 2024, making all Nordic countries members of NATO.

== National positions and chosen strategies ==
=== Finland ===
Finland had fought two wars, the Winter War and the Continuation War, against the Soviet Union; and also one minor war, the Lapland War, against Nazi Germany. Before these wars Finland had close relations with the Scandinavian countries. After the Continuation War where the Soviet Union forced Finland to sue for peace, but failed in its goal of conquering and annexing the country (in a manner similar to the Baltic States), Finland became neutral and retained a democratic government and a market economy. However, as the country shared 1,300 kilometres of border with the USSR, the position of the Soviet Union could not be ignored in Finnish politics. Regarding the Finnish membership in the Scandinavian defence union, far reaching discussions at state-level were made with the other candidate countries.

These discussions were abruptly ended, when Sweden made a specific requirement, that approval from the Soviet Union must be received if Finland was to join. The Soviet answer was bluntly negative and Finland stayed neutral. In 1948, Finland had signed the Agreement of Friendship, Cooperation, and Mutual Assistance with the Soviet Union, and according to the Soviet point of view, this agreement prohibited Finland's membership in any alliances that it could consider being of military nature, even in those created for defensive reasons.

=== Denmark and Iceland ===
Both Denmark and Iceland showed a clear preference for joining the Scandinavian Defence Union over NATO. According to a 2018 literature review, the reasons why Danes preferred a Scandinavian military alliance over a North-Atlantic one were "ideology (pan-Scandinavianism), the domestic political situation, a strong belief in Swedish military power, and, especially given the different policies of the three Nordic countries, various lessons drawn from the Second World War."

=== Norway and Denmark ===
The proposed union was discussed by a joint Scandinavian committee during the winter of 1948-1949, but the Cold War tensions between the United States and the Soviet Union, and preparations for a western alliance that would result in the North Atlantic Treaty proved that the efforts were in vain. When it became known that the western alliance would not be able to supply the Scandinavian countries with armaments before meeting their own pressing needs, this issue ultimately proved to be the turning point for Norway, which resigned from the talks. Denmark was still willing to enter into an alliance with Sweden, but the Swedes saw few advantages in this and the proposal failed. Norway and Denmark subsequently became signatory parties of the North Atlantic Treaty and members of NATO.

=== Sweden ===
Sweden chose not to join NATO, despite a fierce debate on the issue. One of the strongest proponents was Herbert Tingsten, editor-in-chief of Dagens Nyheter, the largest newspaper in Sweden, who used editorials to argue why Sweden should join. He found a great opponent in the foreign minister of the time Östen Undén, who argued that Sweden should stay non-aligned and remain neutral in case of war. The position of Sweden as a member of the western world was not in doubt, but it could not, based on the choices it had made on foreign policy, join the western military alliance.

== Later developments ==
=== Nordic Battlegroup ===
Whilst not a defence union, the Nordic Battlegroup is a multi-national military unit. It is one of eighteen European Union Battlegroups that support European Union defence and security objectives. It consists of around 2,500 troops from Sweden, Finland, Norway, Ireland, Estonia, Latvia and Lithuania.

=== Nordic Defence Cooperation ===
The Nordic Defence Cooperation (Nordefco) is an ad-hoc collaboration established between the Nordic countries in 2009 for finding common solutions, strengthening the national defences and increasing cooperation between them. It has not generally been seen as a mutual defence pact and it is not regarded as a command structure, but its members have increasingly added features that show some resemblance to a defence pact. In 2021, the defence ministers of Denmark, Norway and Sweden signed an agreement of increased cooperation among their militaries with a coordination structure that would make it easier to "act together in peace, crisis or conflict" in the southern Nordic region, and in 2022 it was agreed to further enhance the capabilities by allowing access to each other's airspace and military infrastructure.

A similar agreement for the northern Nordic region already existed between Finland, Norway and Sweden, which was further updated in 2022. Following Finland's and Sweden's request to join NATO, Denmark, Iceland and Norway released a statement saying that in the case of an attack on Finland or Sweden before they had become part of NATO, all necessary means would be used to help in their defence. Finland became a member of NATO on 4 April 2023. and Sweden on 7 March 2024.

== See also ==
- Military of Denmark
- Military of Finland
- Military of Norway
- Military of Sweden
- Scandinavism
- Swedish neutrality
