= Danish Defence Maintenance Service =

- Forsvarets Vedligeholdelsestjeneste
- Logo
- Active: 1 January 2020; 5 years ago
- Country: Denmark
- Branch: Joint
- Role: Maintenance
- Size: c. 1.700
- Headquarters: Sødalsparken 20, 8220 Brabrand
- Website: Official website (in Danish)

Commanders
- Chief of the FVT: Flotille admiral Per Hesselberg

The Danish Defence Maintenance Service (Danish: Forsvarets Vedligeholdelsestjeneste, abbr. FVT) is the element of the Danish Defence responsible for maintenance and service for all equipment.

== History ==
In 2019, it was decided that to join the three branches' maintenance services, in order to focus more effectively on the resource management. It was created with a 1:1 move of personnel, from the branch maintenance services.

FVT is split into three departments, FVT Land, Maritime and Air, each responsible for their own branch.

== Commanding officer ==
No.	Portrait	Name (born–died)	Term of office			Ref.
No.	Portrait	Name (born–died)	Took office	Left office	Time in office	Ref.
1		Flotille admiral Per Hesselberg (born 1962)	15 September 2019	Incumbent	5 years, 187 days	
