= Jette Albinus =

Danish army general

Jette Albinus (born 1966) is the first woman in the Royal Danish Army to hold the rank of general. She was promoted on 11 September 2017 when she was also entrusted with taking command of the Danish Home Guard.

== Biography ==
Born on 8 April 1966, Jette Albinus began her military career in 1988 when she trained as a reserve officer. In 1990, she continued basic training as officer until 1995 when she spent a year at the Royal Danish Military Academy. She subsequently attended the Royal Danish Defence College (2001–03). In 2009, she earned master's degree in Sport and Welfare from the University of Copenhagen.

Albinus has risen through the ranks since she became a senior lieutenant in 1990, becoming captain (1996), major (2003), lieutenant colonel (2009) and finally general in 2017. In 1996, she taught at the Home Guard School, in 2000 she was operations officer in the 1st Jutland Brigade, in 2003 she joined the Institute for Military Operations at the Defence College as a teacher and a member of the media group and in 2008 she was appointed head of the West Jutland Home Guard District. More recently, she was head of basic officer training at the Army Officers Training School (2012–14) and from 2014 she headed the Danish Veteran Centre.
