= Ministry of Defence (Denmark) =

Government ministry of Denmark

Danish Ministry of Defence (MoD)
- Forsvarsministeriet

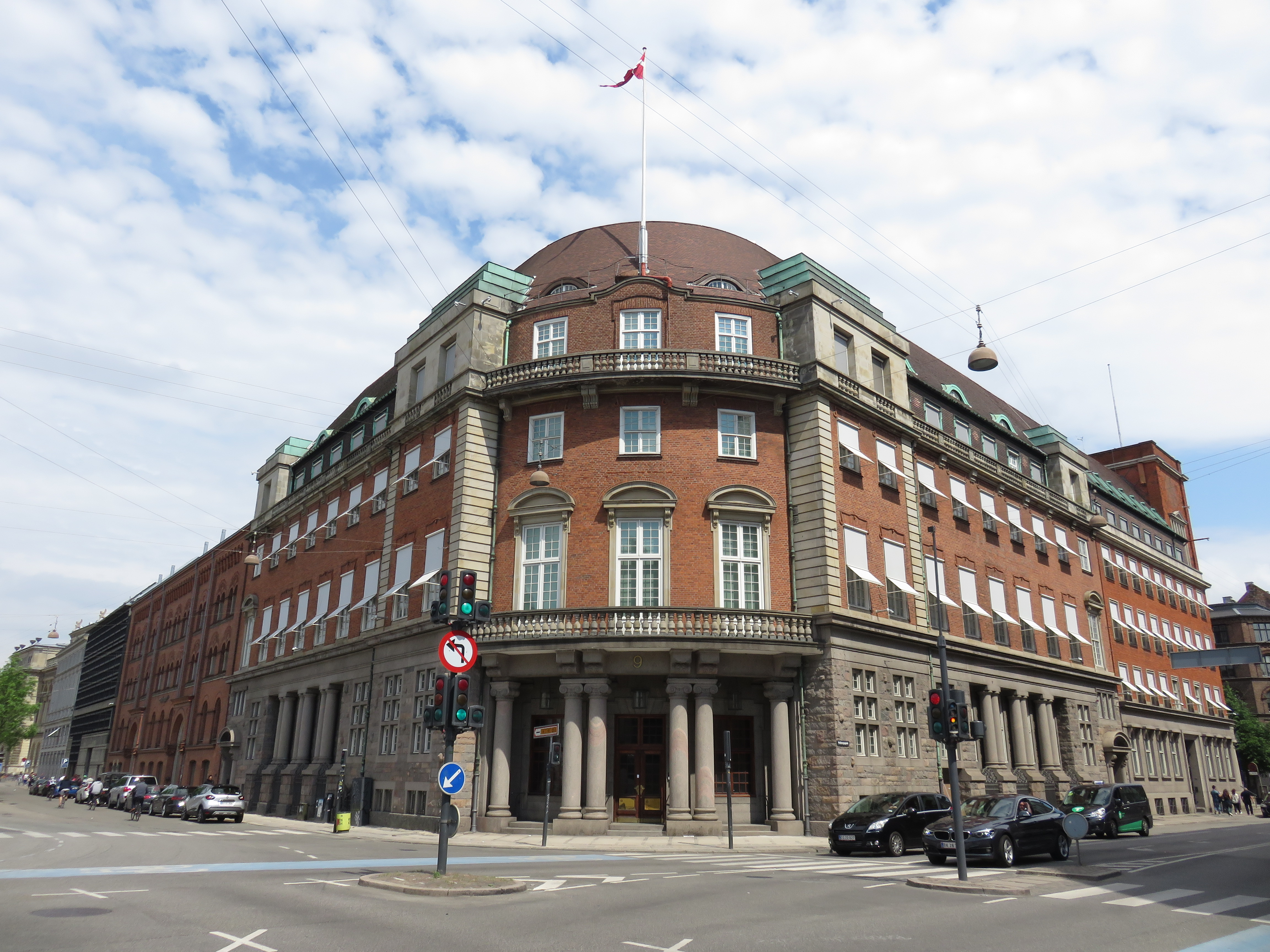
- MOD headquarters since 2017

Ministry overview
- Formed: 27 May 1950; 76 years ago
- Preceding agencies: Ministry of War; Ministry for the Navy
- Headquarters: Holmens Kanal 42, Copenhagen
- Annual budget: 21 billion DKK (2016)
- Minister responsible: Jeppe Bruus, Minister of Defence
- Ministry executive: Pernille Langeberg (acting), Permanent secretary
- Website: fmn.dk

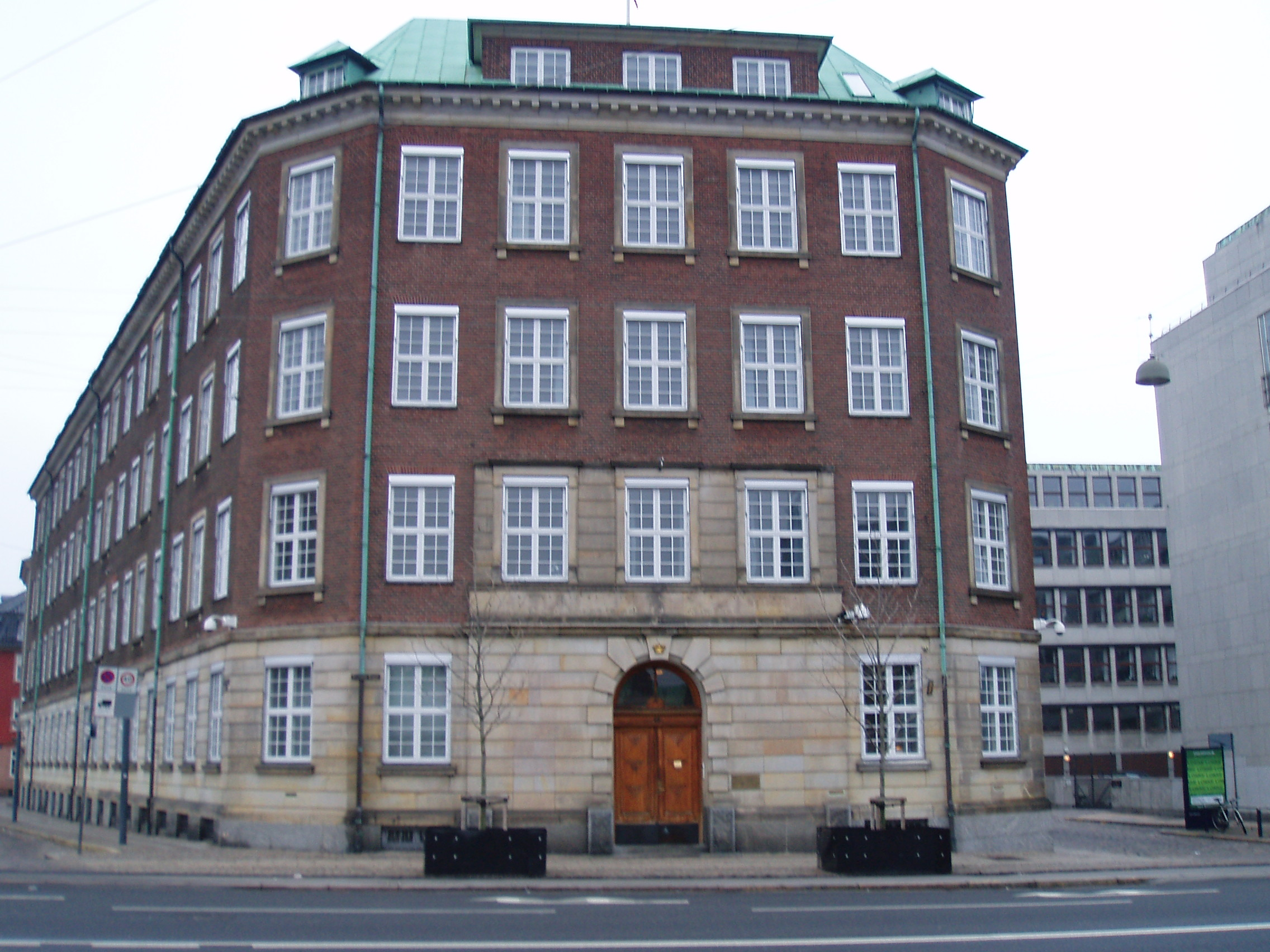
Former Ministry of Defence headquarters prior to 2017

The Danish Ministry of Defence (Danish: Forsvarsministeriet, short FMN) is a ministry in the Danish government. It is charged with overall planning, development, and strategic guidance of the entire area of responsibility of the Minister of Defence, including the Danish Armed Forces and the emergency management sector. It is Denmark's ministry of defence and serves as the secretariat of the Danish Defence Minister.

It also employs the administrator of the easternmost land in Denmark, the small archipelago Ertholmene.

== History ==
The Ministry can trace its history back to 1660, when King Frederick III established a War Collegium (Krigskollegium) to administer the army in both war- and peacetime. A similar command had previously been created for the navy, the Admiralty (Admiralitetet) of 1655.

The War Collegium changed its name to Krigskancelliet in 1679 and later to Generalitets- og Kommisariatskollegiet. On March 21, 1848, the day after the de-facto end to absolute monarchy in Denmark, Anton Frederik Tscherning became the first War Minister of Denmark, with the Generalitets- og Kommisariatskollegiet changing its name to the Ministry of War (Krigsministeriet) on March 25, 1848. Likewise, on April 21, 1848, Adam Wilhelm Moltke became the first Marine Minister (while simultaneously being Prime Minister), while the Admiralitetet changed its name to the Marine Ministry (Marineministeriet).

The modern Ministry of Defence (Forsvarsministeriet) was established following the Danish defence law of May 27, 1950 (law #272), which reorganized the central structure of the military of Denmark. This combined the previous Krigsministeriet and Marineministeriet. The Minister of Defence had already been created in 1905 as the head of both ministries, though both still had branch (Army and Navy) chiefs as administrators.

== Organisation ==
- Ministry of Defence
  - Department
    - Senior Executive Board
      - Capabilities
      - Group Finance
      - Defence Agreement Management and Analysis
      - Security Policy
      - Operations and National Defence
      - Legal
      - Executive Affairs and Strategic HR
      - Strategic HR and Veterans
  - Danish Defence
  - Home Guard
  - Defence Intelligence Service (DDIS)
  - Danish Ministry of Defence Acquisition and Logistics Organisation (DALO)
  - Danish Ministry of Defence Accounting Agency
  - Danish Ministry of Defence Military Prosecution Service
  - Captain of His Majesty the King's Naval Household
  - His Majesty the King's Military Household
  - Christiansø Administration

== See also ==
- List of Danish government ministries
