= Conscription in Denmark =

Conscription in Denmark (Danish: Værnepligt) is mandatory for all physically fit men and women over the age of 18, according to the Constitution of Denmark, §81 and the Danish Law of Conscription, §2. The service lasts between 4 and 12 months. Under the Danish Realm and protected by the Danish Defence, citizens from Greenland and the Faroe Islands are not required to serve as conscripts.

In March 2024, it was announced that the Danish government would be extending military conscription to women for the first time and also increase the standard service time from 4 to 11 months. The changes went into effect on 1 July 2025.

== History ==
Conscription has been practised in Denmark since the Viking Age, where one physical man of every 10th court was required to serve the king. Frederick IV of Denmark changed the law in 1710 to every 4th court. The men were chosen by the landowner, with being chosen being seen as a penalty.

Since 12 February 1849, all physically fit men were obligated to conscription, according to the Constitution of Denmark, which was founded in the same year. Conscripts were required to wear their uniform on leave until 1966.

== Regulation ==
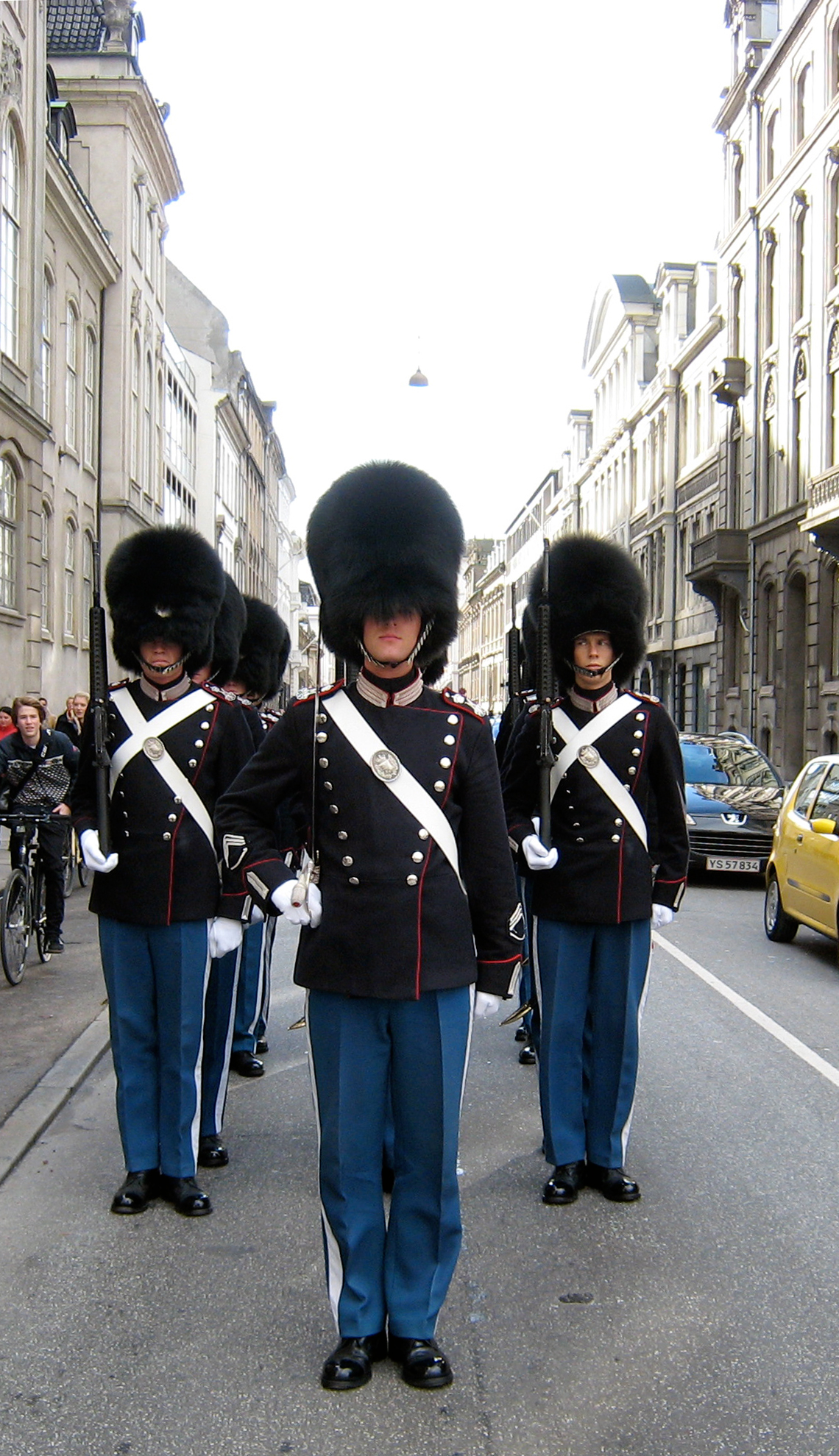
Conscription duty as Royal Life Guards.

According to §81 of the Constitution of Denmark, every Danish male adult has to complete military service.

Every male person able to bear arms shall be liable with his person to contribute to the defence of his country under such rules as are laid down by statute.

— Constitution of Denmark, §81

In 2025, this obligation was extended to women following a change in the conscription law. The legislation of the compulsory military service is articulated in the Danish Law of Conscription. The national service lasts between 4 and 12 months. It is possible to postpone the conscription until his education is complete.

=== 'Day of Defence' ===
Every citizen over the age of 18 will be drafted into the 'Day of Defence' (forsvarets dag), where they will be introduced to the Danish military and have their health tested. Citizens who are not physically fit are not required to participate in the draw. Citizens considered healthy or partially capable have to participate in the draw.

==== Drawing ====
Physically fit people and partially fit people have to draw a number. Citizens deemed partially capable draw a number but do not have to serve their conscription if they choose not to, even if it is a number where a physically fit man would have to serve. Citizens determined to be physically healthy can be forced to fulfil their conscription, depending on which number they draw. The numbers 8,000-36,000 (frinumre) will not lead to conscription in peacetime. The numbers 1–8,000 can lead to conscription — even in peacetime — if there are not enough volunteers.

=== Service ===
Conscripts in the Danish Defence (Army, Navy and Air Force) generally serve 11 months, except:

- Conscripts of the Guard Hussar Regiment Mounted Squadron, who serve 12 months.
- Conscripts with Cyber-conscription, who serve 10 months.
- Conscripts aboard the Royal Yacht Dannebrog, who serve 9 months.
- Conscripts in the Danish Emergency Management Agency, who serve 9 months.

=== Military and non-military duty ===
According to the Danish Law of Conscription from 12 December 2003, §2, one must provide conscription for the military (the Danish Defence) or perform a non-military duty, for example in the Danish Emergency Management Agency, as an aid worker in a developing country or, if a conscientious objector (militærnægter), in the civil service. Voluntary service in the armed forces or emergency services can, according to rules set by the Minister of Defence, take the place of military service.

=== Number of participants ===
In 2006, 76% of conscripts were volunteers, a number which rose to 99.1% in 2014. The other 0.9% (19 individuals) were forced to serve in the military.

In 2012, the number of conscripts was lowered from 5,000 participants to 4,200 participants. This is being upheld until 2020.

Since the Russo-Ukrainian war post 2022, many Danish parties have engaged in talks about increasing the number of conscripts up to 15,000 in the upcoming years. This is part of the state's plan which works to improve the Danish army’s capabilities at defence, which have suffered greatly since the end of the Cold War.

== Rights ==
Logo for Conscription Council

To protect the rights of the conscripts, the Conscription Council (Danish: Værnepligtsrådet) was created in 1968. It works as an independent trade union and is focused on handling the interests of the conscripts.

== Criticism ==
Conscription is heavily criticized on grounds of involuntary servitude and economic reasons. According to a poll from July 2011, 2 out of 3 Danes want conscription abolished.

== Rank insignia ==
Insignia for conscripts in the Guard Hussar Regiment and Royal Life Guards

Insignia for conscripts in the Guard Hussar Regiment Mounted Squadron

Insignia for conscripts in the Jutland Dragoon Regiment

Insignia for conscripts in the Royal Danish Navy

Insignia for conscripts in the Royal Danish Air Force

== Service time ==
Months of service	Year	Ref.
5.5	1909	
12	1951	
18	1952	
17	1953	
16	1954	
14	1966	
13.5	1969	
9	1973	
4	1980	
11	2025	

== See also ==
- Conscription
- Military service
