= Baele =

Baele is a Belgian surname. Notable people by that name include:

- Etienne Baele (1891–1975), chief of staff of the Belgian army
- Pierre-Antoine Baele (born 1992), French paratriathlete
- Philippe Baele (born 1951), Belgian anaesthesiologist
- Walter Baele (born 1964), Flemish cabaretier and actor
