= Omar Bradley =

United States Army general (1893–1981)

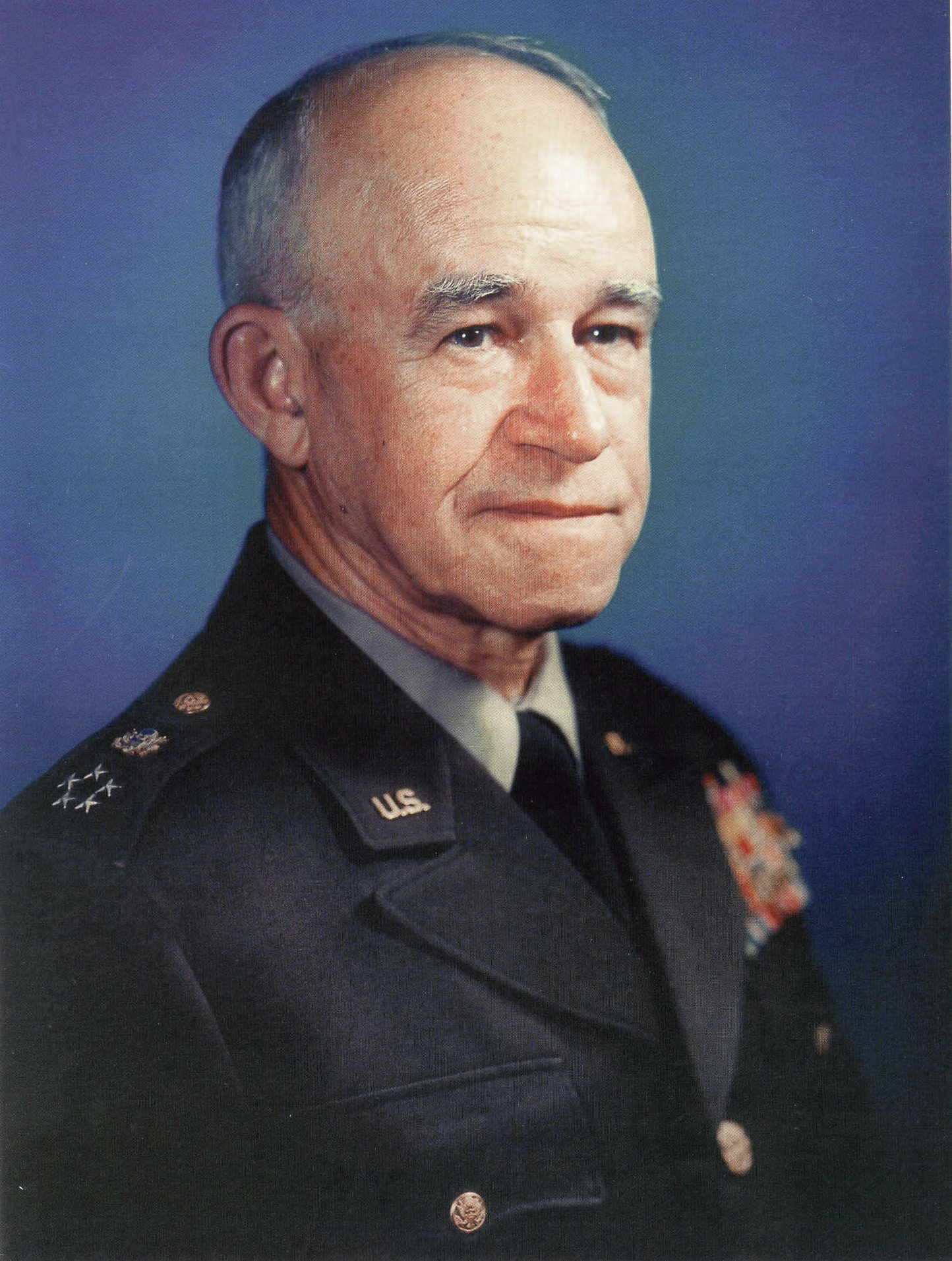
- Bradley, c. 1950

1st Chairman of the Joint Chiefs of Staff
- In office 19 August 1949 – 15 August 1953
- President: Harry S. Truman; Dwight D. Eisenhower
- Preceded by: William D. Leahy (as Chief of Staff to the Commander in Chief)
- Succeeded by: Arthur W. Radford

Chief of Staff of the Army
- In office 7 February 1948 – 15 August 1949
- President: Harry S. Truman
- Preceded by: Dwight D. Eisenhower
- Succeeded by: J. Lawton Collins

Chair of the NATO Military Committee
- In office 5 October 1949 – 2 April 1951
- Preceded by: Office established
- Succeeded by: Etienne Baele

Administrator of Veterans Affairs
- In office 15 August 1945 – 30 November 1947
- President: Harry S. Truman
- Preceded by: Frank T. Hines
- Succeeded by: Carl R. Gray Jr.

Personal details
- Born: Omar Nelson Bradley; 12 February 1893 Clark, Missouri, U.S.
- Died: 8 April 1981 (aged 88) New York City, U.S.
- Resting place: Arlington National Cemetery
- Spouses: Mary Quayle (m. 1916; died 1965); Esther Dora Buhler (m. 1966)
- Education: United States Military Academy (BS)
- Nickname(s): Brad; The G.I.'s General

Military service
- Branch/service: United States Army
- Years of service: 1915–1981
- Rank: General of the Army
- Unit: Infantry Branch
- Commands: Chairman of the Joint Chiefs of Staff; Chief of Staff of the Army; 12th Army Group; First Army; II Corps; 28th Infantry Division; 82nd Infantry Division; United States Army Infantry School; 2nd Battalion, 14th Infantry Regiment
- Battles/wars: See battles: Border War; World War I; World War II; North African campaign; Operation Torch; Tunisian campaign; Battle of Hill 609; Operations Vulcan and Strike; Italian campaign; Operation Husky; Battle of Troina; Operation Overlord; Normandy landings; Omaha Beach; Operation Cobra; Operation Lüttich; Falaise pocket; Operation Chastity; Siegfried Line campaign; Battle of Aachen; Battle of Hürtgen Forest; Operation Queen; Battle of the Bulge; Battle of Heartbreak Crossroads; Battle of Elsenborn Ridge; Battle of Losheim Gap; Western Allied invasion of Germany; Operation Undertone; Operation Grenade; Ruhr pocket; Korean War
- Awards: Defense Distinguished Service Medal; Army Distinguished Service Medal (4); Navy Distinguished Service Medal; Silver Star; Legion of Merit (2); Bronze Star Medal; Presidential Medal of Freedom; Complete list
- ASN: 0-3807

Omar Nelson Bradley (12 February 1893 – 8 April 1981) was a senior officer of the United States Army during and after World War II, rising to the rank of General of the Army. He was the first chairman of the Joint Chiefs of Staff and oversaw the U.S. military's policy-making in the Korean War.

Born in Randolph County, Missouri, he worked as a boilermaker before entering the United States Military Academy at West Point. He graduated from the academy in 1915 alongside Dwight D. Eisenhower as part of "the class the stars fell on." During World War I, he guarded copper mines in Montana. After the war, he taught at West Point and served in other roles before taking a position at the War Department under General George Marshall. In 1941, he became commander of the United States Army Infantry School.

After the U.S. entry into World War II, he oversaw the transformation of the 82nd Infantry Division into the first American airborne division. He received his first front-line command in Operation Torch, serving under General George S. Patton in North Africa. After Patton was reassigned, Bradley commanded II Corps in the Tunisia Campaign and the Allied invasion of Sicily. He commanded the First United States Army during the invasion of Normandy. After the breakout from Normandy, he took command of the Twelfth United States Army Group, which ultimately comprised 43 divisions and 1.3 million men, the largest body of American soldiers ever to serve under a single field commander.

After the war, Bradley headed the Veterans Administration. He was appointed as Chief of Staff of the United States Army in 1948 and Chairman of the Joint Chiefs of Staff in 1949. In 1950, he was promoted to the rank of General of the Army, becoming the last of the nine individuals promoted to five-star rank in the United States Armed Forces. He was the senior military commander at the start of the Korean War, and supported President Harry S. Truman's wartime policy of containment. He was instrumental in persuading Truman to dismiss General Douglas MacArthur in 1951 after MacArthur resisted administration attempts to scale back the war's strategic objectives. Bradley left active duty in 1953 (although remaining on "active retirement" for the next 27 years). He continued to serve in public and business roles until his death in 1981 at age 88.

== Early life and education ==
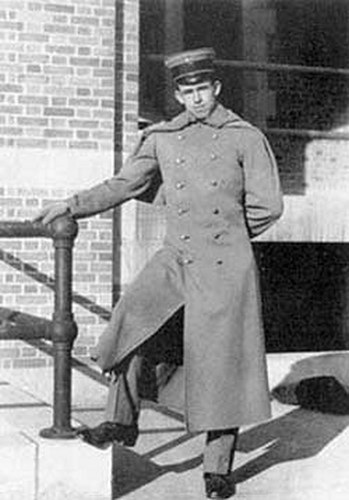
Bradley, photographed at West Point

Omar Nelson Bradley, the son of schoolteacher John Smith Bradley (1868–1908) and his wife Mary Elizabeth (née Hubbard; 1875–1931), was born into poverty in rural Randolph County, Missouri, near Moberly in 1893. Bradley was named after Omar D. Gray, a local newspaper editor admired by his father, and a local physician, James Nelson. He was of British ancestry, his ancestors having emigrated from Great Britain to Kentucky in the mid-1700s. He attended at least eight country schools where his father taught. The elder Bradley never earned more than $40 a month in his lifetime, while he was a schoolteacher and sharecropper, the latter with the aid of all the family. They never owned a wagon, a horse, or a mule. When Omar was 15, his father died; he credited his father with passing on to him his love of books, baseball and shooting.

His mother moved with him to Moberly, where she remarried. Bradley graduated from Moberly High School in 1910. He was an outstanding student and athlete who was chosen captain of both the baseball and track teams.

Bradley was working as a 17-cents-an-hour (equal to $5.87 today) boilermaker at the Wabash Railroad when he was encouraged by his Sunday school teacher at Central Christian Church in Moberly to take the entrance examination for the United States Military Academy (USMA) at West Point, New York. Bradley had been saving his money to enter the University of Missouri in Columbia, where he intended to study law. He finished second in the West Point placement exams, held at Jefferson Barracks Military Post in St. Louis, Missouri. The first-place winner was unable to accept the Congressional appointment, however, and the nomination was passed to Bradley in August 1911.

While Bradley was attending the academy, he did not excel academically; but still ranked 44th in a class of 164. He was a baseball star and often played on semi-pro teams for no remuneration (to ensure his eligibility as an amateur to represent the academy). He was considered one of the most outstanding college players in the nation during his junior and senior seasons at West Point, noted as both a power hitter and an outfielder, with one of the best arms in his day. He rejected multiple offers to play professional baseball, choosing to pursue his Army career.

While stationed at West Point as an instructor, in 1923 Bradley became a Freemason. He became a member of the West Point Lodge #877, Highland Falls, New York and continued with them until his death.

Bradley married Mary Quayle (1892–1965), who had grown up across the street from him in Moberly. Her father, the town's popular police chief, had died when she was young. The pair attended Central Christian Church and Moberly High School together. On the cover of the 1910 Moberly High School yearbook, The Salutar, they were shown across from each other, although they did not date during those years. His picture bore the description "calculative" and hers "linguistic." She earned a college degree in education.

== West Point and early military career ==
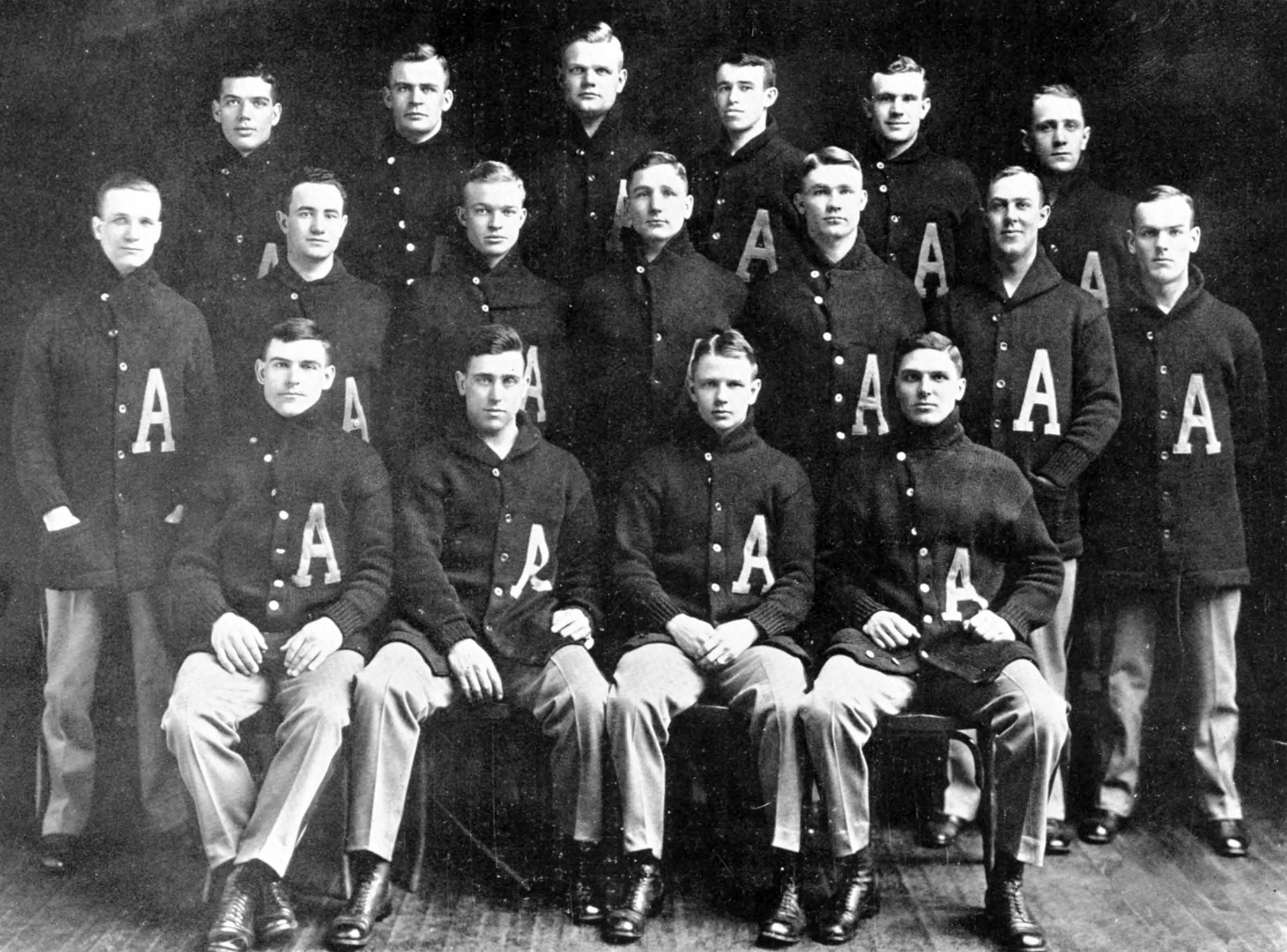
Group photo of the 1915 West Point letterman. Bradley is standing in the back row, third from the right.

At West Point, Bradley played three years of varsity baseball including on the 1914 team. Every player on that team who remained in the army ultimately became a general. He also played football, where he was a teammate of Dwight D. Eisenhower. Bradley graduated from West Point in 1915, known as "the class the stars fell on," which produced 59 future general officers. Bradley's cullum number is 5356.

Bradley was commissioned as a second lieutenant into the Infantry Branch of the United States Army and was first assigned to the 14th Infantry Regiment. In 1915, he served on the Mexico–United States border, defending it from incursions due to the Mexican Civil War. On 1 July 1916 he was promoted to first lieutenant.

When the United States entered World War I in April 1917 (see the American entry into World War I), he was promoted to captain on 15 May and sent to guard the Butte, Montana copper mines, considered of strategic importance. Bradley was promoted to the temporary rank of major in June 1918 and assigned to command the second battalion of the 14th Infantry. He joined the 19th Division in August 1918, which was scheduled for European deployment, but the influenza pandemic and the armistice with Germany on 11 November 1918 intervened.

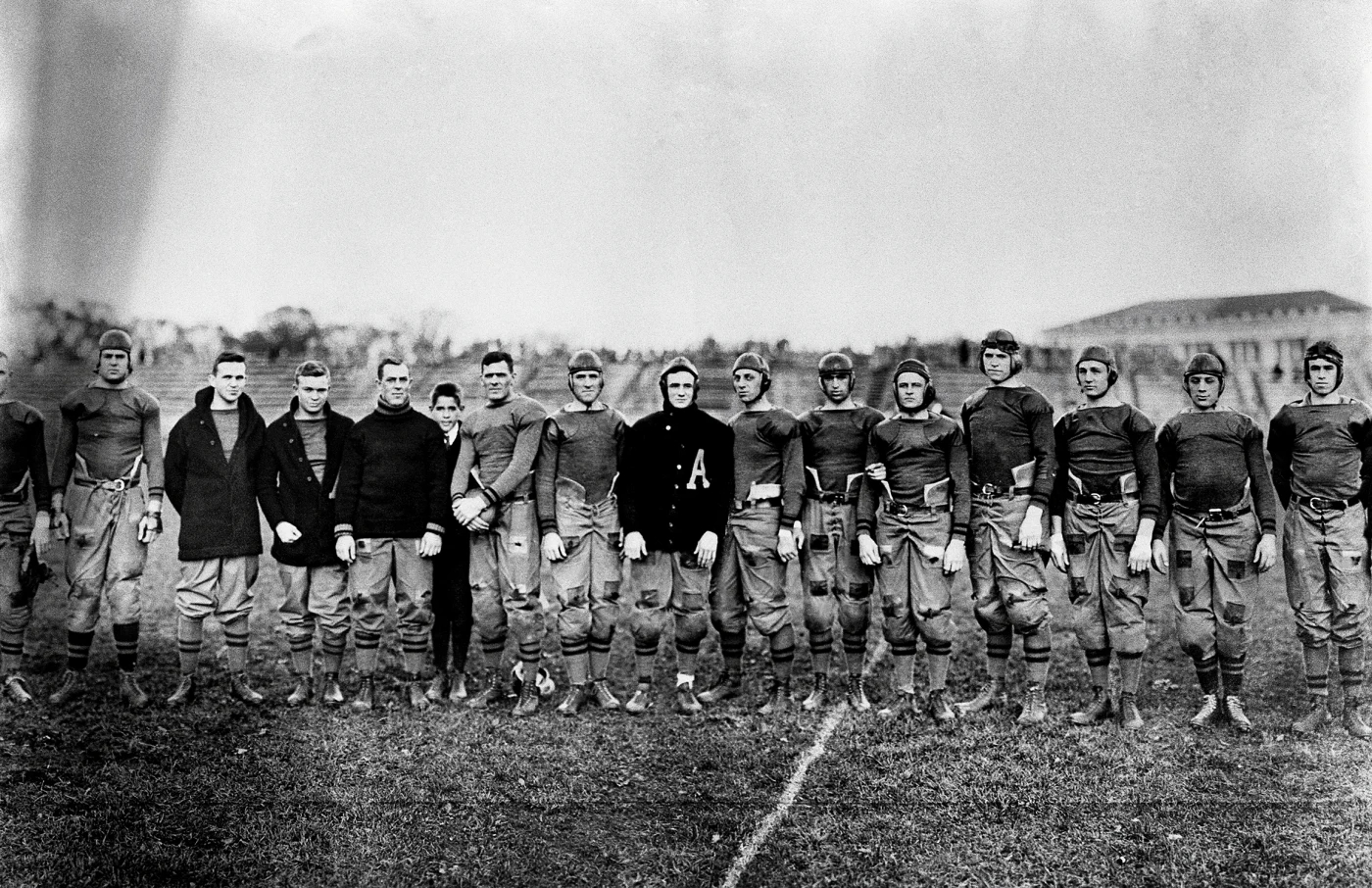
The 1912 West Point football team. Dwight D. Eisenhower is third from left. Louis Merillat is eighth from the left, in the A sweater. Omar Bradley is on the far right, to the left of Leland Hobbs.

From September 1919 until September 1920, Bradley served as assistant professor of military science at South Dakota State College (now University) in Brookings, South Dakota.

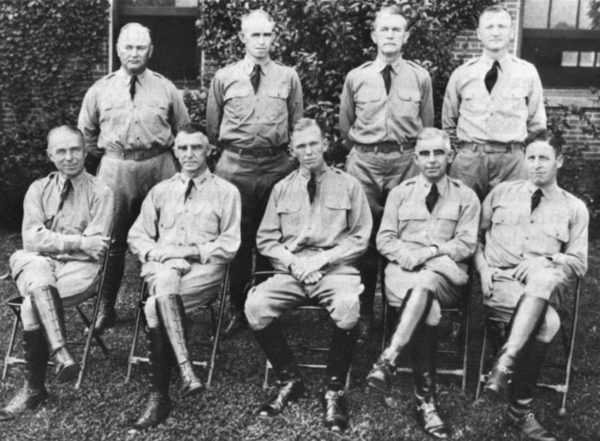
Bradley (back row, second from the left) as an instructor at the Infantry School in the 1930s. The school's assistant commandant, George C. Marshall, is sat in the center of the front row.

During the difficult period between the wars, he taught and studied. From 1920 to 1924, Bradley taught mathematics at West Point. He was promoted to major in 1924 and took the advanced infantry course at Fort Benning, Georgia. After brief duty in Hawaii, Bradley was selected to study at the U.S. Army Command and General Staff School at Fort Leavenworth, Kansas in 1928–29. Upon graduating, he served as an instructor in tactics at the U.S. Army Infantry School. While Bradley was serving in this assignment, the school's assistant commandant, Lieutenant Colonel George C. Marshall, described Bradley as "quiet, unassuming, capable, with sound common sense. Absolute dependability. Give him a job and forget it."

From 1929, Bradley taught again at West Point, studying at the U.S. Army War College in 1934. Bradley was promoted to lieutenant colonel on 26 June 1936 and worked at the War Department; after 1938 he was directly reporting to U.S. Army Chief of Staff Marshall.

On 20 February 1941, Bradley was promoted to the (wartime) temporary rank of brigadier general (bypassing the rank of colonel.) (This rank was made permanent by the army in September 1943). The temporary rank was conferred to allow him to command the U.S. Army Infantry School at Fort Benning, Georgia (he was among the first from his class to reach even a temporary rank of general officer; first was his West Point classmate Luis Esteves, who was promoted Brigadier general in October 1940). While serving in this position he played a key part in developing the officer candidate school model. While serving as commandant, Bradley began a long professional relationship with Willis S. Matthews; Matthews served as his aide-de-camp while he was commandant. When Bradley moved on to command of first the 82nd Infantry Division and later the 28th Infantry Division, Matthews served as assistant chief of staff for operations (G-3). When Bradley served as Chief of Staff of the United States Army, Matthews was again his aide. When Bradley was appointed Chairman of the Joint Chiefs of Staff, Matthews served as his executive officer.

On 15 February 1942, two months after the American entry into World War II, Bradley was made a temporary major general (a rank made permanent in September 1944) and soon took command of the 82nd Infantry Division (soon to be redesignated as the 82nd Airborne Division) before succeeding Major General James Garesche Ord as commander of the 28th Infantry Division in June.

== Louisiana Maneuvers ==
The Louisiana Maneuvers were a series of U.S. Army exercises held around Northern and Western-Central Louisiana, including Fort Polk, Camp Claiborne and Camp Livingston, in 1940 and 1941. The exercises, which involved some 400,000 troops, were designed to evaluate U.S. training, logistics, doctrine, and commanders. Overall, headquarters were in the Bentley Hotel in Alexandria.

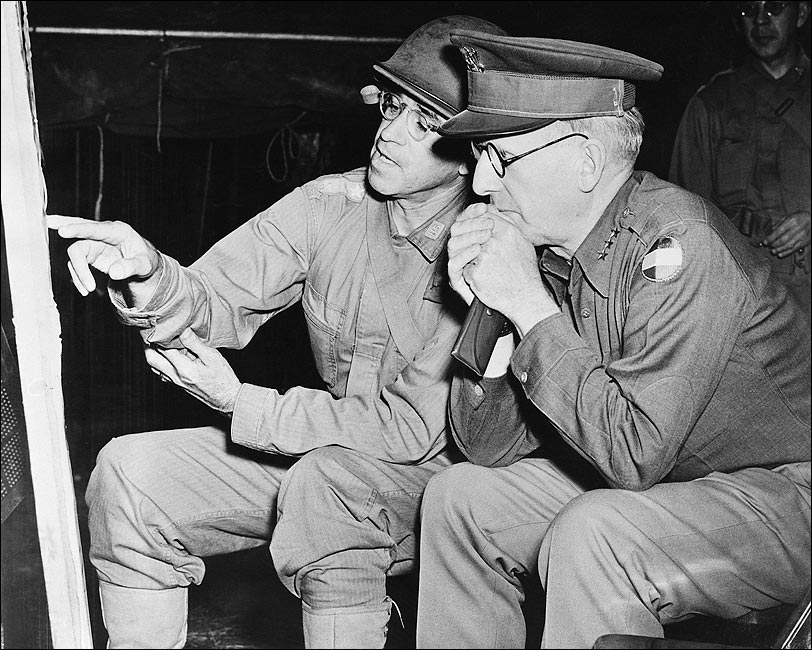
Lesley J. McNair listens as Omar Bradley explains a scenario at the Louisiana Maneuvers

Many Army officers present at the maneuvers later rose to very senior roles in World War II, including Bradley, Mark Clark, Dwight Eisenhower, Walter Krueger, Lesley J. McNair and George Patton.

Lieutenant Colonel Bradley was assigned to General Headquarters during the Louisiana Maneuvers but as a courier and observer in the field, he gained invaluable experience for the future. Colonel Bradley assisted in the planning of the maneuvers, and kept the General Staff in Washington, D.C. abreast of the training that was occurring during the Louisiana Maneuvers.

Bradley later said that Louisianans welcomed the soldiers with open arms. Some soldiers even slept in some of the residents' houses. Bradley said it was so crowded in those houses sometimes when the soldiers were sleeping, there would hardly be any walking room. Bradley also said a few of the troops were disrespectful towards the residents' land and crops, and would tear down crops for extra food. However, for the most part, residents and soldiers established good relations.

== World War II ==
Bradley's personal experiences in the war are documented in his award-winning book A Soldier's Story, published by Henry Holt & Co. in 1951. It was re-released by The Modern Library in 1999. The book is based on an extensive diary maintained by his aide-de-camp, Chester B. Hansen, who ghost-wrote the book using the diary; Hansen's original diary is maintained by the U. S. Army Heritage and Education Center, at Carlisle Barracks, Pennsylvania.

On 25 March 1942, Bradley, recently promoted to major general, assumed command of the newly activated 82nd Infantry Division. Bradley oversaw the division's transformation into the first American airborne division and took parachute training. In August the division was re-designated as the 82nd Airborne Division and Bradley relinquished command to Major General Matthew Ridgway, who had been his assistant division commander (ADC).

Bradley then took command of the 28th Infantry Division, which was a National Guard division with soldiers mostly from the state of Pennsylvania.

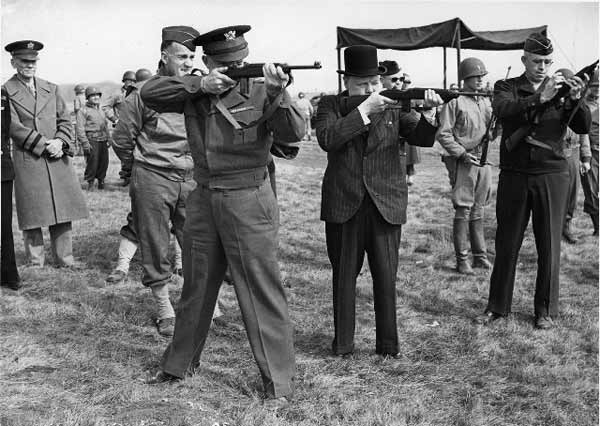
Major General Edward H. Brooks observing General Dwight D. Eisenhower, British Prime Minister Winston Churchill and Lieutenant General Omar Bradley fire M1 carbines shortly before the Normandy landings, 15 May 1944. Stood to the far left, wearing a peaked cap, is Major General Charles H. Corlett.

=== North Africa and Sicily ===
Photograph of Allied commander-in-chief, Eisenhower, and Major General Bradley touring the Tunisian Front, January 1943.

Bradley did not receive a front-line command until early 1943, after Operation Torch, the Allied invasion of French North Africa. He had been given VIII Corps after being succeeded by Lloyd D. Brown as commander of the 28th Division, but instead was sent to North Africa to be Eisenhower's front-line troubleshooter. At Bradley's suggestion, II Corps, which had just suffered a great defeat at the Kasserine Pass, was overhauled from top to bottom, and Eisenhower, now the Supreme Allied Commander of the Allied forces in North Africa, installed Major General George S. Patton as corps commander in March 1943. Patton requested Bradley as his deputy, but Bradley retained the right to represent Eisenhower as well.

Bradley succeeded Patton as commander of II Corps in April and directed it in the final Tunisian battles of April and May, with Bizerte falling to elements of II Corps on 7 May 1943. The campaign as a whole ended six days later, and with it came the surrender of over 200,000 Axis Germans and Italians.

As a result of his excellent performance in the campaign, Bradley was promoted to temporary lieutenant general on 2 June 1943 and continued to command II Corps in the Allied invasion of Sicily (codenamed Operation Husky). The campaign lasted only a few weeks and, as he had in Tunisia, Bradley continued to impress his superiors, Eisenhower most notably, who wrote to Marshall about Bradley:

There is very little I need to tell you about him [Bradley] because he is running absolutely true to form all the time. He has brains, a fine capacity for leadership and a thorough understanding of the requirements of modern battle. He has never caused me one moment of worry. He is perfectly capable of running an Army. He has the respect of all his associates, including all the British officers that have met him.

=== Normandy 1944 ===
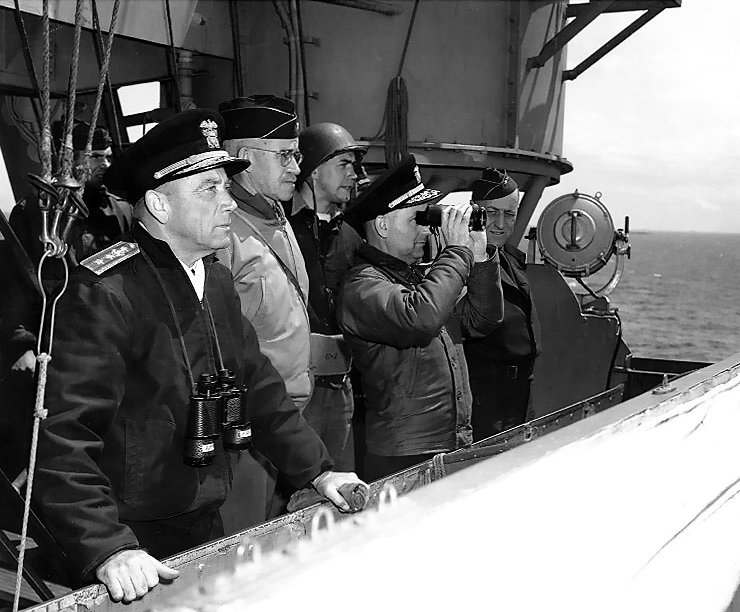
Senior officers watching operations from the bridge of USS Augusta (CA-31), off Normandy, 8 June 1944. They are (from left to right): Rear Admiral Alan G. Kirk, Lieutenant General Omar Bradley, Rear Admiral Arthur D. Struble (with binoculars), and Major General William B. Kean.

On 10 September 1943, Bradley transferred to London as commander in chief of the American ground forces preparing to invade France in the spring of 1944. For D-Day, Bradley was chosen to command the US First Army, which, alongside the British Second Army, commanded by Lieutenant-General Miles Dempsey, made up the 21st Army Group, commanded by General Sir Bernard Montgomery.

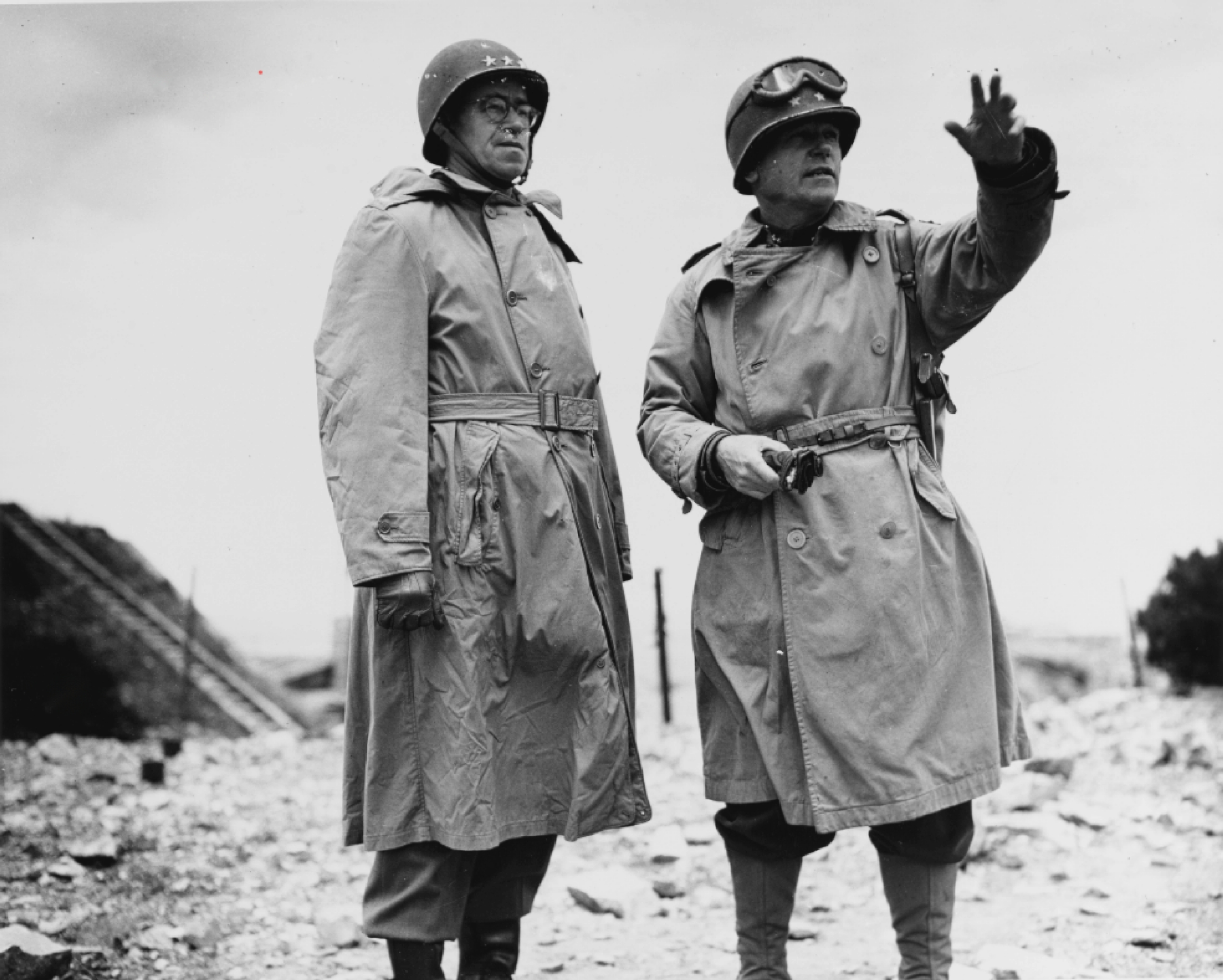
Lieutenant General Omar Bradley (left), Commanding General, U.S. First Army, listens as Major General J. Lawton Collins, Commanding General, US VII Corps, describes how the city of Cherbourg was taken. (c. June 1944)

On 10 June 1944, four days after the initial Normandy landings, Bradley and his staff debarked to establish a headquarters ashore. During Operation Overlord, he commanded three corps directed at the two American invasion targets, Utah Beach and Omaha Beach. During July he inspected the modifications made by Curtis G. Culin to Sherman tanks, that led to the Rhino tank. Later in July, he planned Operation Cobra, the beginning of the breakout from the Normandy beachhead. Operation Cobra called for the use of strategic bombers using huge bomb loads to attack German defensive lines. After several postponements due to weather, the operation began on 25 July 1944, with a short, very intensive bombardment with lighter explosives, designed so as not to create more rubble and craters that would slow Allied progress. Bradley was horrified when 77 planes bombed short and dropped bombs on their own troops, including Lieutenant General Lesley J. McNair:

The ground belched, shook and spewed dirt to the sky. Scores of our troops were hit, their bodies flung from slit trenches. Doughboys were dazed and frightened....A bomb landed squarely on McNair in a slit trench and threw his body sixty feet and mangled it beyond recognition except for the three stars on his collar.

Eisenhower talks with Bradley, then commanding the First Army, near his car at Bradley's headquarters in France, August 1944.

However, the bombing was successful in knocking out the enemy communication system, rendering German troops confused and ineffective, and opened the way for the ground offensive by attacking infantry. Bradley sent in three infantry divisions—the 9th, 4th and 30th—to move in close behind the bombing. The infantry succeeded in cracking the German defenses, opening the way for advances by armored forces commanded by Patton to sweep around the German lines.

As the build-up continued in Normandy, the Third Army was formed under Patton, Bradley's former commander, while Lieutenant General Courtney Hodges, whom Bradley had succeeded as Commandant of the Infantry School, succeeded Bradley in command of the First Army; together, they made up Bradley's new command, the 12th Army Group. By August, the 12th Army Group had swollen to over 900,000 men and ultimately consisted of four field armies. It was the largest group of American soldiers to ever serve under one field commander.

=== Falaise pocket ===
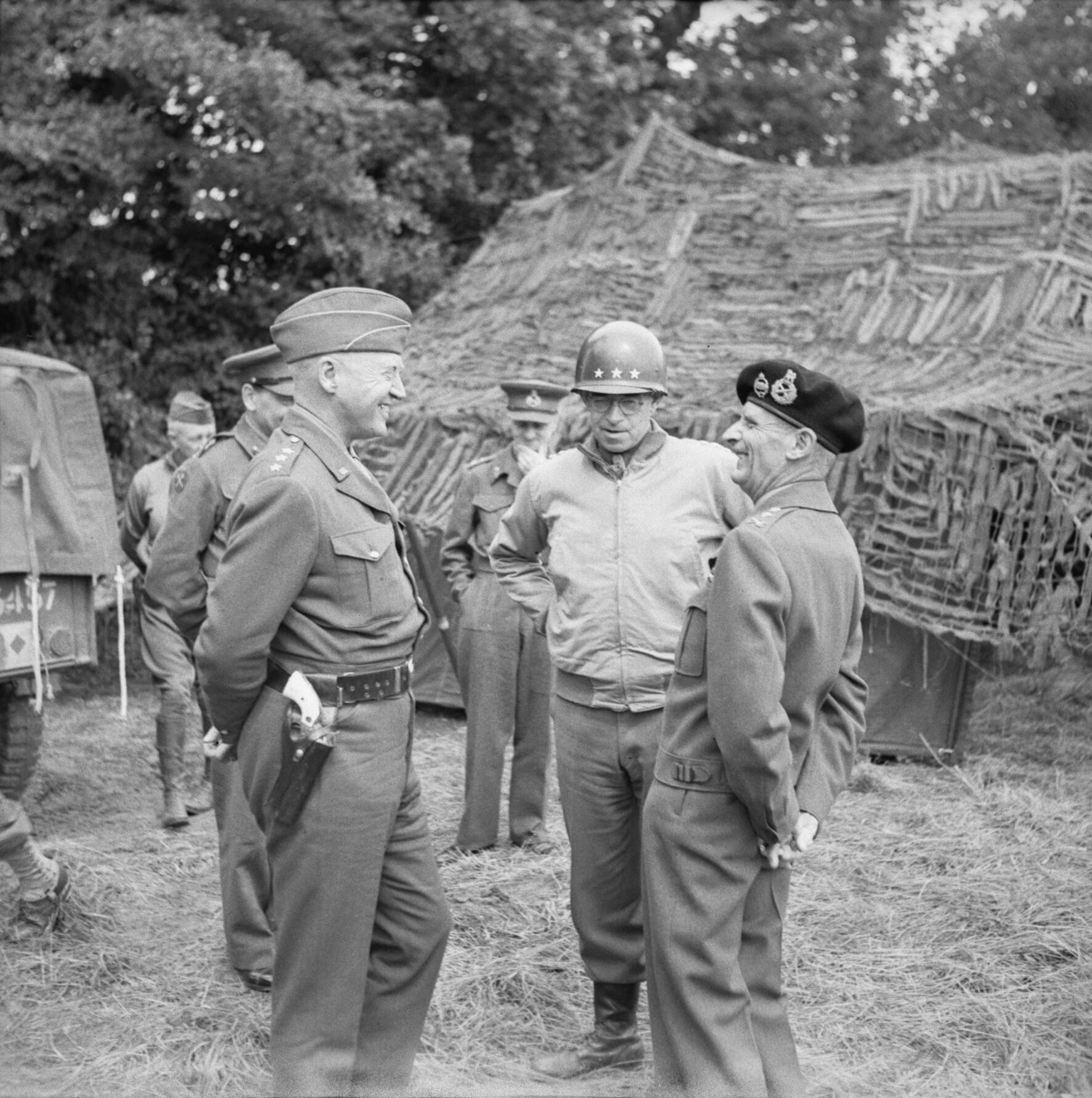
Bradley (center) with Patton (left) and Montgomery (right) at Montgomery's 21st Army Group HQ, Normandy, 7 July 1944

Hitler's refusal to allow his army to flee the rapidly advancing Allied pincer movement created an opportunity to trap an entire German Army Group in northern France. After the German attempt to split the US armies at Mortain (Operation Lüttich), Bradley's Army Group and XV Corps became the southern pincer in forming the Falaise pocket, trapping the German Seventh Army and Fifth Panzer Army in Normandy. The northern pincer was formed of Canadian (and Polish) forces, part of British General Sir Bernard Montgomery's 21st Army Group. On 13 August 1944, concerned that American troops would clash with Canadian forces advancing from the north-west, Bradley overrode Patton's orders for a further push north towards Falaise, while ordering Major General Wade H. Haislip's XV Corps to "concentrate for operations in another direction". Any American troops in the vicinity of Argentan were ordered to withdraw. This order halted the southern pincer movement of Haislip's XV Corps. Though Patton protested the order, he obeyed it, leaving an exit—a "trap with a gap"—for the remaining German forces. Around 20,000–50,000 German troops (leaving almost all of their heavy material) escaped through the gap, avoiding encirclement and almost certain destruction. They would be reorganized and rearmed in time to slow the Allied advance into the Netherlands and Germany. Most of the blame for this outcome has been placed on Bradley. Bradley had incorrectly assumed, based on Ultra decoding transcripts, that most of the Germans had already escaped encirclement, and he feared a German counterattack as well as possible friendly fire casualties. Though admitting that a mistake had been made, Bradley placed the blame on General Montgomery for moving the British and Commonwealth troops too slowly, though the latter were in direct contact with a large number of SS Panzer, paratroopers, and other elite German forces.

=== Germany ===
The American forces reached the "Siegfried Line" or "Westwall" in late September. The success of the advance had taken the Allied high command by surprise. They had expected the German Wehrmacht to make stands on the natural defensive lines provided by the French rivers, and had not prepared the logistics for the much deeper advance of the Allied armies, so fuel ran short.

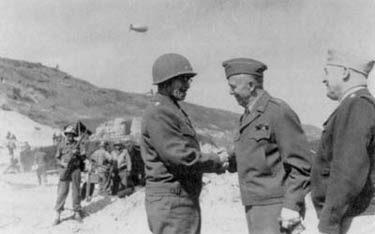
Army Chief of Staff General George Marshall (center) and Army Air Forces Commander General Henry H. Arnold confer with Bradley on the beach at Normandy in 1944

Eisenhower faced a decision on strategy. Bradley favored an advance into the Saarland, or possibly a two-thrust assault on both the Saarland and the Ruhr Area. Montgomery argued for a narrow thrust across the Lower Rhine, preferably with all Allied ground forces under his personal command as they had been in the early months of the Normandy campaign, into the open country beyond and then to the northern flank into the Ruhr, thus avoiding the Siegfried Line. Although Montgomery was not permitted to launch an offensive on the scale he had wanted, George Marshall and Hap Arnold were eager to use the First Allied Airborne Army to cross the Rhine, so Eisenhower agreed to Operation Market Garden. Bradley opposed the operation, and bitterly protested to Eisenhower the priority of supplies given to Montgomery, but Eisenhower, mindful of British public opinion regarding damage from V-1 missile launches in the north, refused to make any changes.

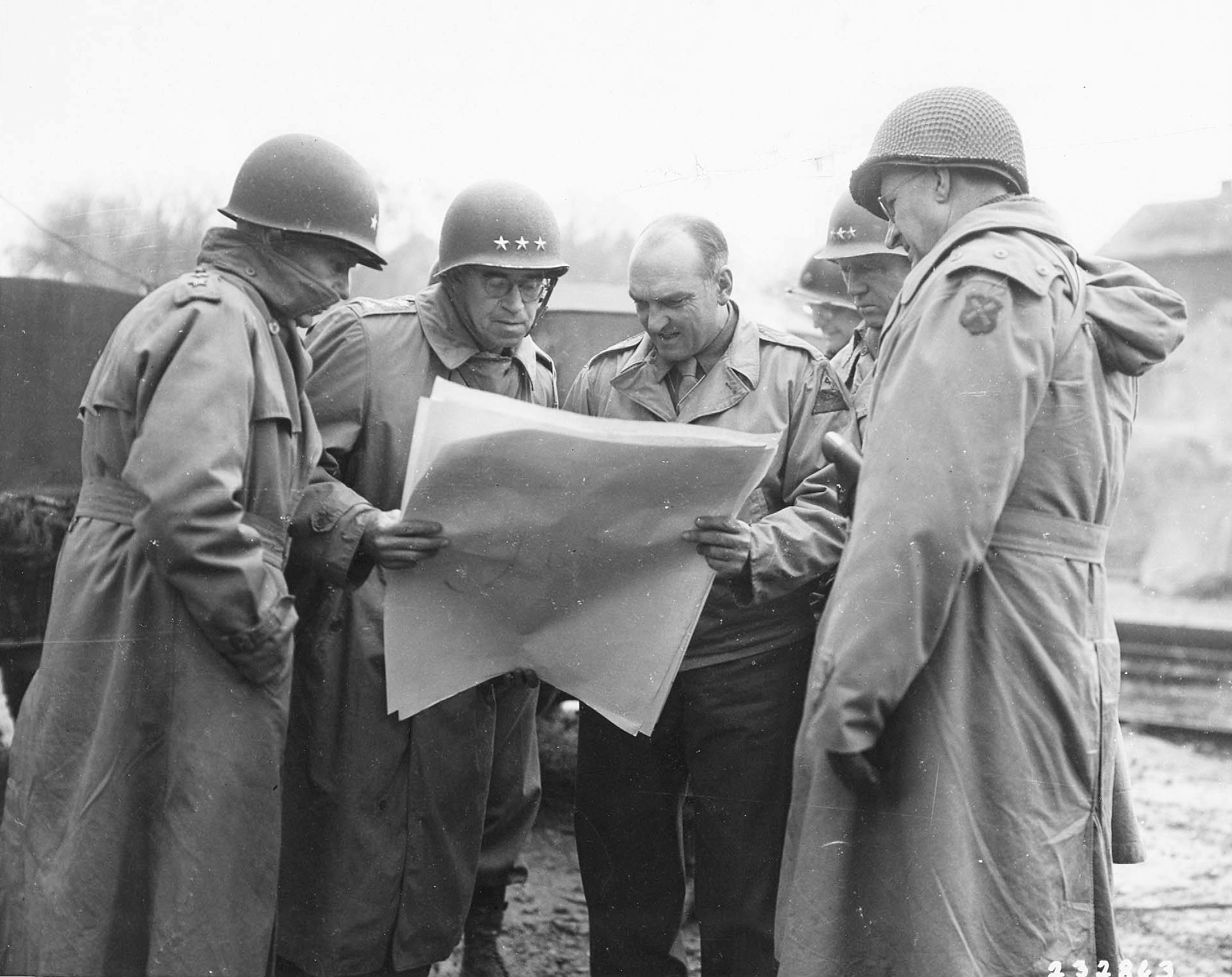
From left to right: Major General Leven C. Allen, Lieutenant General Omar Bradley, Major General John S. Wood, Lieutenant General George S. Patton and Major General Manton S. Eddy being shown a map by one of Patton's armored battalion commanders during a tour near Metz, France, November 1944

Bradley's Army Group now covered a very wide front in hilly country, from the Netherlands to Lorraine. Despite having the largest concentration of Allied army forces, Bradley faced difficulties in prosecuting a successful broad-front offensive in difficult country with a skilled enemy. General Bradley and his First Army commander, General Courtney Hodges, eventually decided to attack through a corridor known as the Aachen Gap towards the German township of Schmidt. The only nearby military objectives were the Roer River flood control dams, but these were not mentioned in contemporary plans and documents. Bradley and Hodges' original objective may have been to outflank German forces and prevent them from reinforcing their units further north in the Battle of Aachen. After the war, Bradley would cite the Roer dams as the objective. Since the Germans held the dams, they could also unleash millions of gallons of water into the path of advance. The campaign's confused objectives, combined with poor intelligence, resulted in the costly series of battles known as the Battle of Hurtgen Forest, which cost some 33,000 American casualties. At the end of the fighting in the Hurtgen, German forces remained in control of the Roer dams in what has been described as "the most ineptly fought series of battles of the war in the west." Further south, Patton's Third Army, which had been advancing with great speed, was faced with last priority (behind the U.S. First and Ninth Armies) for supplies, gasoline and ammunition. As a result, the Third Army lost momentum as German resistance stiffened around the extensive defenses surrounding the city of Metz. While Bradley focused on these two campaigns, the Germans were in the process of assembling troops and materiel for a surprise winter offensive.

=== Battle of the Bulge ===
High ranking officers discuss the situation near Wiltz, Luxembourg, November 1944. From left to right: Major General John W. Leonard, Major General Troy H. Middleton, Lieutenant General Bradley, and General Eisenhower.

Bradley's command took the initial brunt of what would become the Battle of the Bulge. For logistical and command reasons, General Eisenhower decided to place Bradley's First and Ninth Armies under the temporary command of Field Marshal Montgomery's 21st Army Group on the northern flank of the Bulge. Bradley was incensed, and began shouting at Eisenhower: "By God, Ike, I cannot be responsible to the American people if you do this. I resign." Eisenhower turned red, took a breath, and replied evenly, "Brad, I—not you—am responsible to the American people. Your resignation therefore means absolutely nothing." Bradley paused, made one more protest, then fell silent as Eisenhower concluded, "Well, Brad, those are my orders."

At least one historian has attributed Eisenhower's support for Bradley's subsequent promotion to (temporary) four-star general (March 1945, not made permanent until January 1949) to, in part, a desire to compensate him for the way in which he had been sidelined during the Battle of the Bulge. Others point out that both Secretary of War Stimson and General Eisenhower had desired to reward General Patton with a fourth star for his string of accomplishments in 1944, but that Eisenhower could not promote Patton over Bradley, Devers, and other senior commanders without upsetting the chain of command (as Bradley commanded these people in the theater). A more likely explanation is that as Bradley commanded an Army Group and was the immediate subordinate of Eisenhower, who was promoted to five star rank on 20 December 1944, it was only appropriate that he should hold the next lower rank.

=== Victory ===
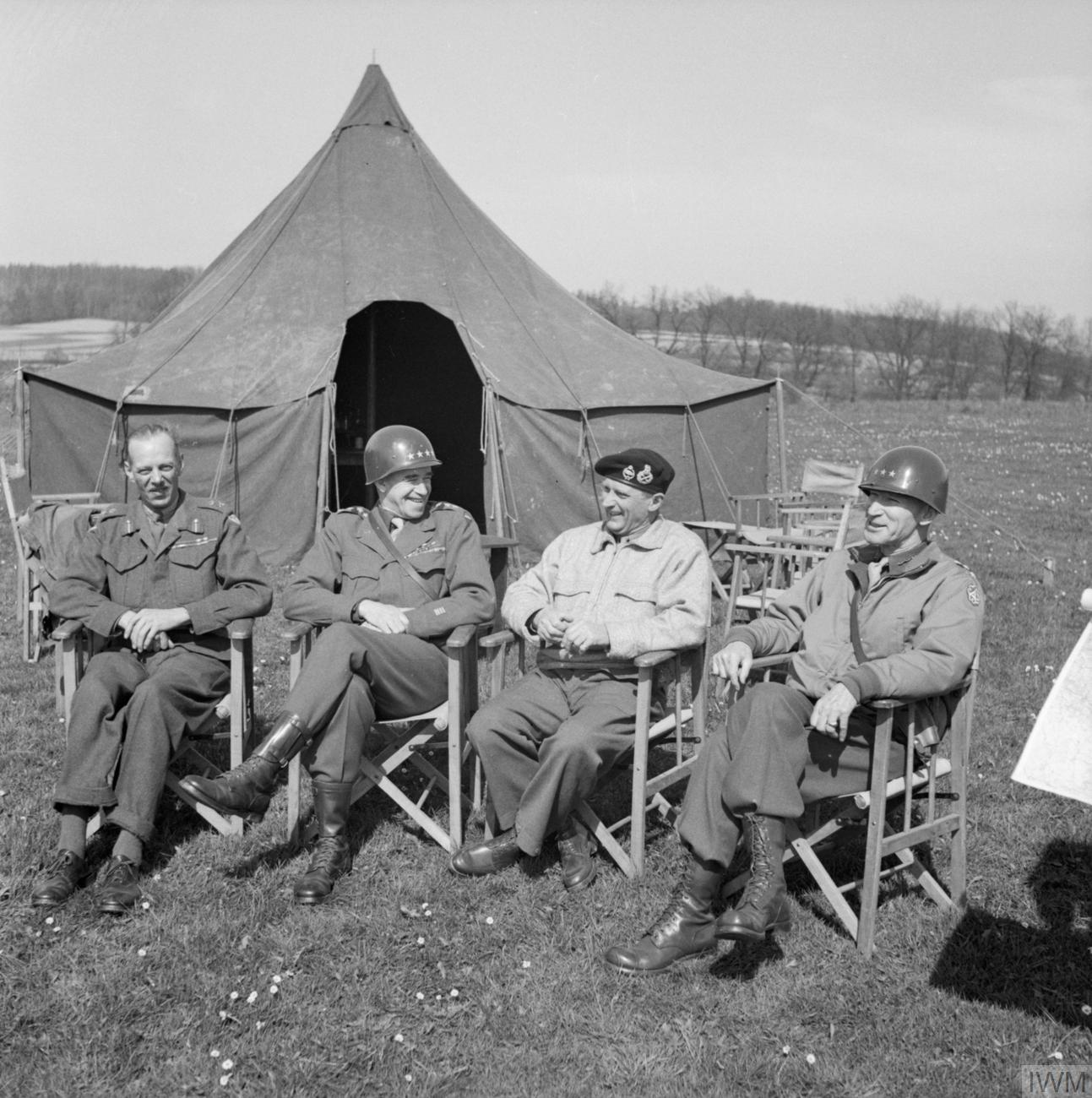
Allied commanders conference, 11 April 1945. Lieutenant-General Sir Miles Dempsey (commanding the British Second Army); General Omar Bradley (C-in-C 12th Army Group); Field Marshal Sir Bernard Montgomery (C-in-C 21st Army Group); Lieutenant General William H. Simpson (commanding the U.S. Ninth Army)

Bradley used the advantage gained in March 1945—after Eisenhower authorized a difficult but successful Allied offensive (on a broad front with British Operation Veritable to the north and American Operation Grenade to the south) in February 1945—to break the German defenses and cross the Rhine into the industrial heartland of the Ruhr. Aggressive pursuit of the disintegrating German troops by the 9th Armored Division resulted in the capture of a bridge across the Rhine River at Remagen. Bradley quickly exploited the crossing, forming the southern arm of an enormous pincer movement encircling the German forces in the Ruhr from the north and south. Over 300,000 prisoners were taken. American forces then met up with the Soviet forces near the Elbe River in mid-April. By V-E Day, the 12th Army Group was a force of four armies (First, Third, Ninth, and Fifteenth) that numbered over 1.3 million men.

=== Command style ===
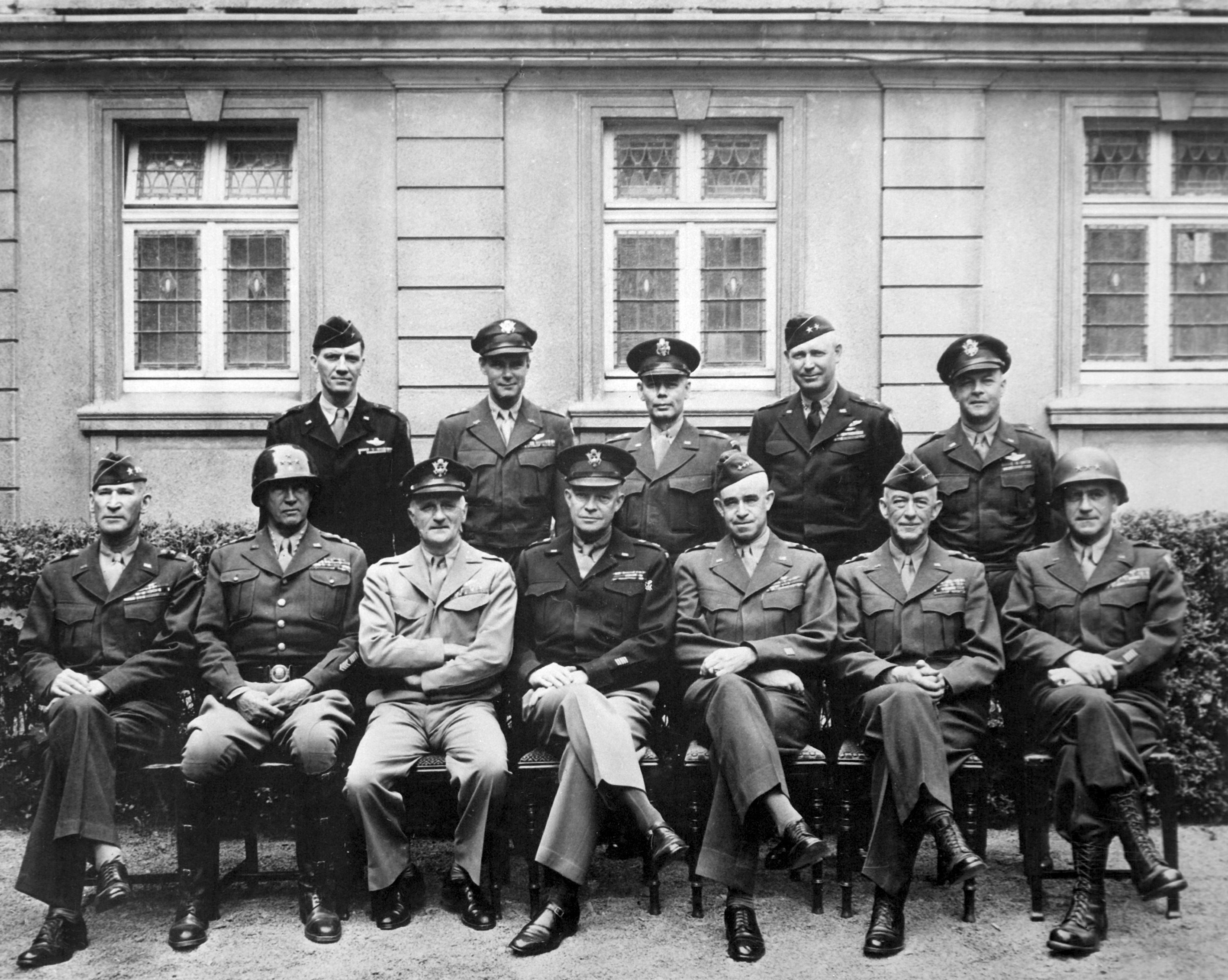
Senior American commanders of the European theater of World War II, 1945. Seated, from left to right, are William H. Simpson, George S. Patton, Carl Spaatz, Dwight D. Eisenhower, Omar Bradley, Courtney Hodges, and Leonard T. Gerow; standing are (from left to right) Ralph F. Stearley, Hoyt Vandenberg, Walter Bedell Smith, Otto P. Weyland, and Richard E. Nugent

Unlike some of the more colorful generals of World War II, Bradley was polite and courteous in his public appearances. A reticent man, Bradley was first favorably brought to public attention by war correspondent Ernie Pyle, who was urged by General Eisenhower to "go and discover Bradley". Pyle subsequently wrote several dispatches in which he referred to Bradley as the GI's general, a title that would stay with Bradley throughout his remaining career. Will Lang Jr. of Life magazine said "The thing I most admire about Omar Bradley is his gentleness. He was never known to issue an order to anybody of any rank without saying 'Please' first."

While the public at large never forgot the image created by newspaper correspondents, a different view of Bradley was offered by combat historian S. L. A. Marshall, who knew both Bradley and George Patton, and had interviewed officers and men under their commands. Marshall, who was also a critic of George S. Patton, noted that Bradley's "common man" image "was played up by Ernie Pyle...The GIs were not impressed with him. They scarcely knew him. He's not a flamboyant figure and he didn't get out much to troops. And the idea that he was idolized by the average soldier is just rot."

While Bradley retained his reputation as the GI's general, he was criticized by some of his contemporaries for other aspects of his leadership style, sometimes described as "managerial" in nature. British General Bernard Montgomery's assessment of Bradley was that he was "dull, conscientious, dependable, and loyal". He had a habit of peremptorily relieving senior commanders who he felt were too independent, or whose command style did not agree with his own, such as the colorful and aggressive General Terry Allen, commander of the U.S. 1st Infantry Division (who was relocated to a different command because Bradley felt that his continued command of the division was making it unmanageably elitist, a decision with which Eisenhower concurred). While Patton is often viewed today as the archetype of the intolerant, impulsive commander, Bradley actually sacked far more generals and senior commanders during World War II, whereas Patton relieved only one general from his command—Orlando Ward—for cause during the entire war (and only after giving General Ward two warnings). When required, Bradley could be a hard disciplinarian; he recommended the death sentence for several soldiers while he served as the commander of the First Army.

One controversy of Bradley's leadership involved the lack of use of specialized tanks (Hobart's Funnies) in the Normandy invasion. After the war Chester Wilmot quoted correspondence with the developer of the tanks, Major General Percy Hobart, to the effect that the failure to use such tanks was a major contributing factor to the losses at Omaha Beach, and that Bradley had deferred the decision whether to use the tanks to his staff who had not taken up the offer, other than in respect of the DD (swimming) tanks. However a later memo from the 21st Army Group is on record as relaying two separate requests from the First Army, one dealing with the DD tanks and "Porpoises" (towed waterproof trailers), the other with a variety of other Funnies. The second list gives not only items of specific interest with requested numbers, but items known to be available that were not of interest. The requested items were modified Shermans, and tank attachments compatible with Shermans. Noted as not of interest were Funnies that required Churchill or Valentine tanks, or for which alternatives were available from the US. Of the six requested types of Funnies, the Sherman flamethrower version of the Churchill Crocodile is known to have been difficult to produce, and the Centipede never seems to have been used in combat. Richard Anderson considers that the press of time prevented the production of the other four items in numbers beyond the Commonwealth's requirements. Given the heavier surf and the topography of Omaha Beach, it is unlikely that the funnies would have been as useful there as they were on the Commonwealth beaches. The British had agreed to provide British-crewed Funnies to operate with the American forces but were unable to train the crews and deliver the vehicles in time.

== Post-war ==
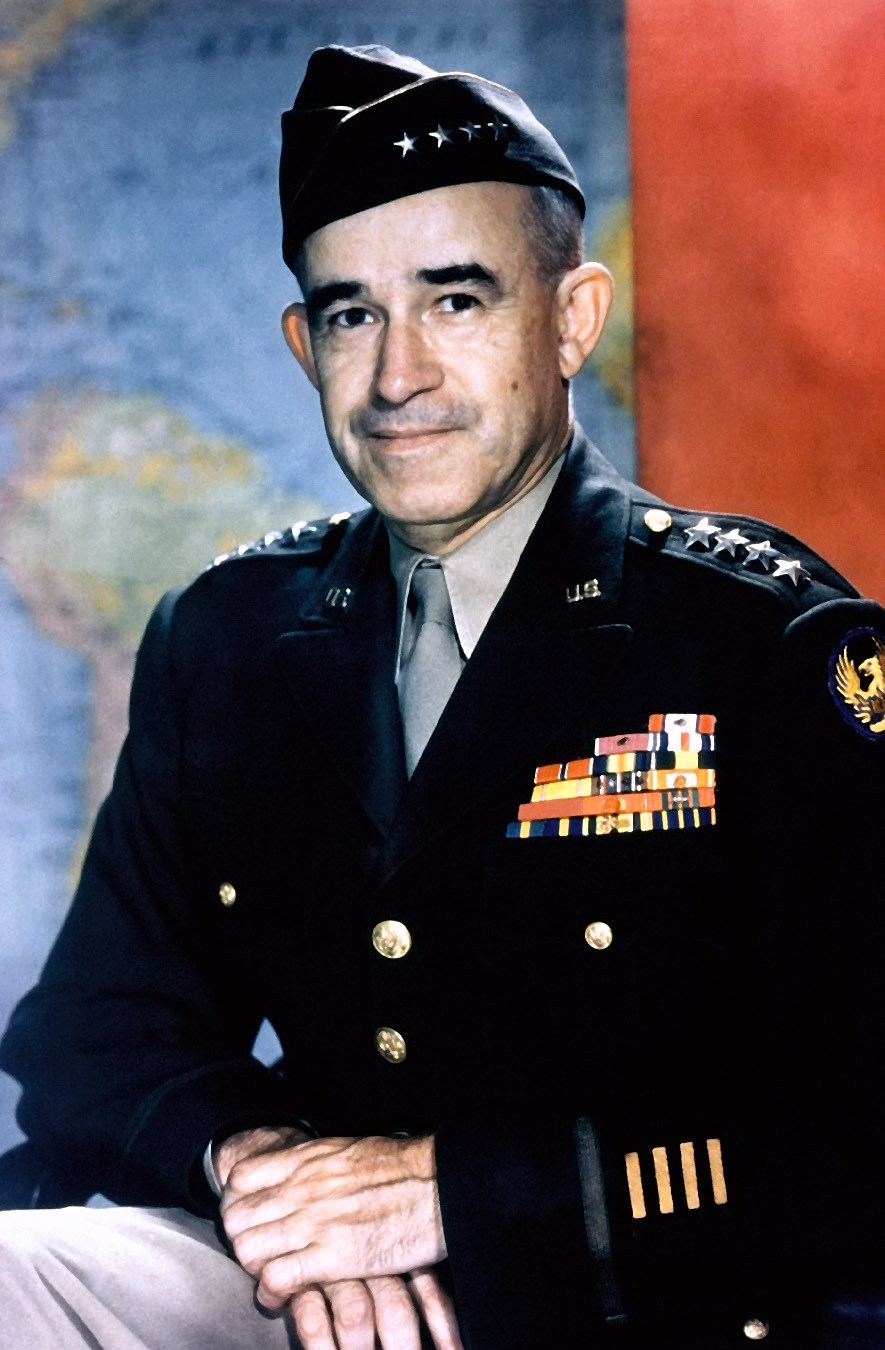
Official portrait of Bradley as the Administrator of Veterans Affairs, c. 1945

=== Veterans Administration ===
President Truman appointed Bradley to head the Veterans Administration for two years after the war. He served from 15 August 1945 to 30 November 1947, being credited with doing much to improve its health care system and with helping veterans receive their educational benefits under the G. I. Bill of Rights. Bradley's influence on the VA is credited with helping shape it into the agency it is today. He was a regular visitor to Capitol Hill and lobbied on behalf of veterans' benefits in testimony before various congressional veteran affairs committees. Due to his numerous contributions to the Veterans Administration, the Secretary of Veterans Affairs' primary conference room at the headquarters of the Department of Veterans Affairs is named in Bradley's honor.

=== Chairman of the Joint Chiefs of Staff ===
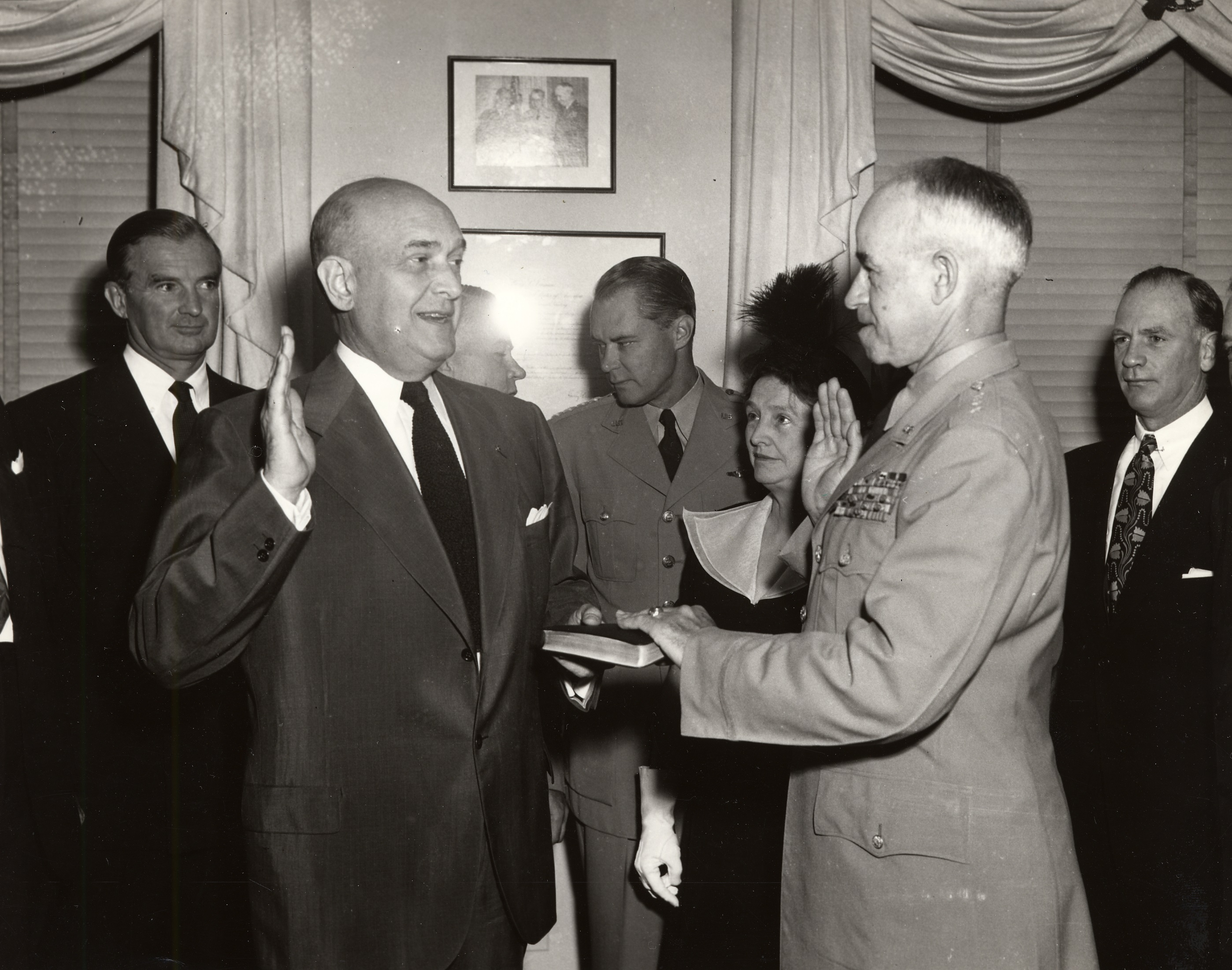
Secretary of Defense Louis Johnson swears in Bradley as the first Chairman of the Joint Chiefs of Staff during a ceremony in Washington, D.C., 16 August 1949

Bradley became the Army Chief of Staff in 1948. After assuming command, Bradley found a U.S. military establishment badly in need of reorganization, equipment, and training. As Bradley himself put it, "the Army of 1948 could not fight its way out of a paper bag."

On 11 August 1949, president Harry S. Truman appointed Bradley the first Chairman of the Joint Chiefs of Staff. After his initial 1948 plan to expand the Army and modernize its equipment was rejected by the Truman Administration, Bradley reacted to the increasingly severe postwar defense department budget cutbacks imposed by Secretary of Defense Louis A. Johnson by publicly supporting Johnson's decisions, going so far as to tell Congress that he would be doing a "disservice to the nation" if he asked for a larger military force. Bradley also suggested that official Navy protests of Secretary Johnson's canceling the supercarrier United States were due to improper personal or political, even mutinous motives, calling Navy admirals "fancy dans who won't hit the line with all they have on every play unless they can call the signals", and who were in "open rebellion against the civilian control."

In his second memoir, Bradley would later state that not arguing more forcefully in 1948 and 1949 for a sufficient defense budget "was a mistake... perhaps the greatest mistake I made in my postwar years in Washington."

When Truman announced Executive Order 9981, abolishing discrimination "on the basis of race, color, religion or national origin" in the Armed Forces, in July 1948, Bradley disliked the order, commenting that “[t]he Army is not out to make any social reforms." Bradley was forced by Truman to issue a public apology.

On 22 September 1950, he was promoted to the rank of General of the Army, the fifth—and last—person to achieve that rank. That same year, Bradley was made the first Chairman of the NATO Military Committee. He remained on the committee until August 1953, when he left active duty. During his service, Bradley visited the White House over 300 times and was frequently featured on the cover of Time magazine.

Bradley was also an outspoken supporter of providing aid and improving relations with Yugoslavia, stating in an address to Congress on 30 November 1950, that "In the first place, if we could even take them out of the hostile camp and make them neutral, that is one step. If you can get them to act as a threat, that's a second step. if you can get them to actively participate on your side, that is an even further step and then, of course, if you had a commitment, where their efforts were integrated with those of ours on the defence, that would still be a further step." This marked the beginning of US military aid to a communist nation in order to counter Soviet ambitions in the region, leading to greater efforts in United States–Yugoslavia relations.

In 1950 Bradley was elected as an honorary member of the New York Society of the Cincinnati in recognition of his outstanding service to his country.

=== Korean War ===
As Chairman of the Joint Chiefs of Staff, Bradley was the senior military officer at the outset of the Korean War. When North Korea invaded South Korea in June 1950, Bradley was faced with re-organizing and deploying an American military force that was a shadow of its World War II counterpart. The impact of the Truman administration's defense budget cutbacks were now keenly felt, as poorly equipped American troops, lacking sufficient tanks, anti-tank weapons, or artillery were driven down the Korean peninsula to Pusan in a series of costly rearguard actions. In a postwar analysis of the unpreparedness of U.S. Army forces deployed to Korea during the summer and fall of 1950, Army Major General Floyd L. Parks stated that "Many who never lived to tell the tale had to fight the full range of ground warfare from offensive to delaying action, unit by unit, man by man...[T]hat we were able to snatch victory from the jaws of defeat...does not relieve us from the blame of having placed our own flesh and blood in such a predicament."

Bradley was the chief military policy maker during the Korean War, and supported Truman's original plan of 'rolling back' Communist aggression by conquering all of North Korea. When Chinese Communists entered North Korea in late 1950 and again drove back American forces, Bradley agreed that rollback had to be dropped in favor of a strategy of containment of North Korea. The containment strategy was subsequently adopted by the Truman administration for North Korea, and applied to communist expansion worldwide. Never an admirer of General Douglas MacArthur, Bradley was instrumental in convincing Truman to dismiss MacArthur as the overall commander in the Korean theatre after MacArthur resisted administration attempts to scale back strategic objectives in the Korean War.

In his testimony to the U.S. Congress, Bradley strongly rebuked MacArthur for his support of victory at all costs in the Korean War. Soon after Truman relieved MacArthur of command in April 1951, Bradley said in Congressional testimony, "Red China is not the powerful nation seeking to dominate the world. Frankly, in the opinion of the Joint Chiefs of Staff, this strategy would involve us in the wrong war, at the wrong place, at the wrong time, and with the wrong enemy."

== Retirement ==
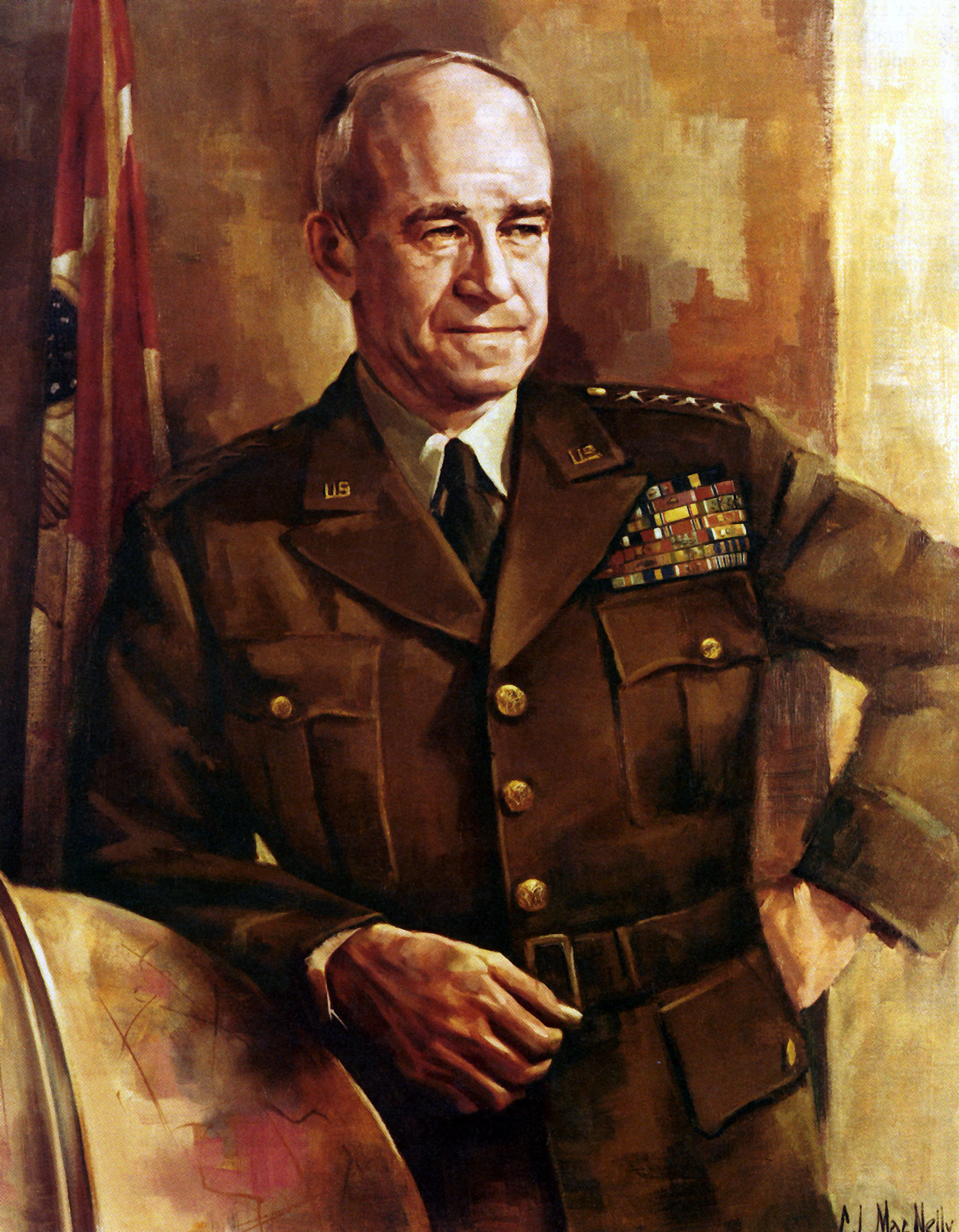
Portrait of Bradley

Bradley left active military service in August 1953, but remained on active duty by virtue of his rank of General of the Army. He chaired the Commission on Veterans' Pensions, commonly known as the "Bradley Commission", in 1955–1956. In January 1956, Bradley became one of the founding members of the President's Board of Consultants on Foreign Intelligence Activities, later the President's Intelligence Advisory Board. Bradley was also an inaugural member of the Fulbright Foreign Scholarship Board.

In retirement, Bradley held a number of positions in commercial life, including Chairman of the Board of the Bulova Watch Company from 1958 to 1973. He frequently visited Moberly, Missouri, which he described as his hometown and his favorite city in the world. He was a member of the Moberly Rotary Club, regularly played near-handicap golf at the Moberly Country Club course, and had a "Bradley pew" at Central Christian Church.

His memoirs, A Soldier's Story (ghostwritten by aide-de-camp Chester B. Hansen who kept a daily diary for him during the war), was published in 1951. Bradley started work on his autobiography A General's Life: An Autobiography (1983) before his death; it was coauthored with Clay Blair, who completed it posthumously. In this work, Bradley criticized British Field Marshal Montgomery's 1945 claims to have won the Battle of the Bulge.

On 1 December 1965, Bradley's wife, Mary, died of leukemia. He met Esther Dora "Kitty" Buhler (1922–2004) and married her on 12 September 1966; they were married until his death.

As a horse racing fan, Bradley spent much of his leisure time at racetracks in California. He was often invited to present the trophies to the winners. He was a lifetime sports fan, especially of college football. He was the 1948 Grand Marshal of the Tournament of Roses and attended several subsequent Rose Bowl games. (He was driven in his black limousine through Pasadena; it had a personalized California license plate "ONB" and a red plate with 5 gold stars. He frequently was given a police motorcycle escort to the Rose Bowl on New Year's Day.) He also was prominent at the Sun Bowl in El Paso, Texas, and the Independence Bowl in Shreveport, Louisiana in later years.

In 1967–1968 Bradley served as a member of President Lyndon Johnson's Wise Men, a high-level advisory group considering policy for the Vietnam War. Bradley was a hawk and recommended against withdrawal.

Following the death of Dwight D. Eisenhower in March 1969, Bradley was the only surviving 5-star officer in the US Armed Forces.

In 1970, Bradley served as a consultant for the film Patton. Screenwriters Francis Ford Coppola and Edmund H. North wrote most of the film based on Bradley's memoir, A Soldier's Story, and the biography, Patton: Ordeal and Triumph, by Ladislas Farago. The screenwriters did not have access to General Patton's diaries nor did Patton's family grant interviews. They relied upon observations by Bradley and other military contemporaries when attempting to reconstruct Patton's thoughts and motives.

In a review of the film Patton, S.L.A. Marshall, who knew both Patton and Bradley, stated that "The Bradley name gets heavy billing on a picture of [a] comrade that, while not caricature, is the likeness of a victorious, glory-seeking buffoon...Patton in the flesh was an enigma. He so stays in the film...Napoleon once said that the art of the general is not strategy but knowing how to mold human nature...Maybe that is all producer Frank McCarthy and Gen. Bradley, his chief advisor, are trying to say." Though each recognized that he owed part of his success to the other, it was known that Bradley disliked Patton both personally and professionally, but in the film they are portrayed as friendly.

In 1971 Bradley was the subject of an episode of the TV show This Is Your Life.

Bradley attended the 30th anniversary of D-Day at Normandy, France on 6 June 1974, participating in various parades.

On 10 January 1977, Bradley was presented with the Presidential Medal of Freedom by President Gerald Ford.

In 1978, Bradley received the Golden Plate Award of the American Academy of Achievement presented by Awards Council member General Jimmy Doolittle.

Bradley was the keynote speaker at Pointe du Hoc, Normandy, France on 6 June 1979, for the 35th anniversary of D-Day. While seated in a wheelchair, he performed an open ranks inspection of the U.S. representative army unit, the 84th Army Band from VII Corps HQ, Stuttgart, West Germany.

Bradley lived during his last years in Texas at a special residence on the grounds of the William Beaumont Army Medical Center, part of the complex which supports Fort Bliss.

One of Bradley's last public appearances was as the guest of honor at the inauguration of President Ronald Reagan on 20 January 1981.

== Death ==
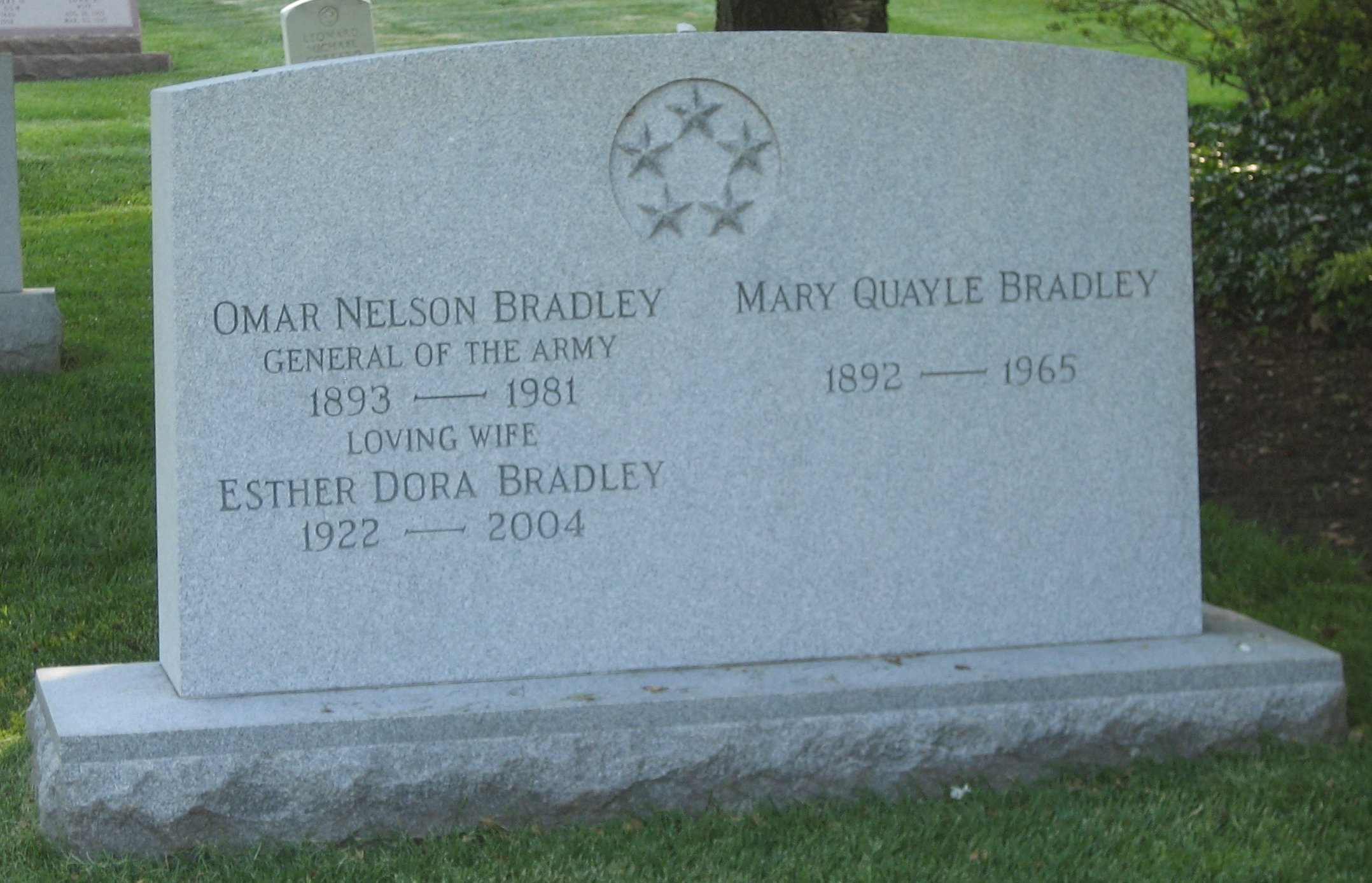
General Bradley's headstone in Arlington National Cemetery

Omar Bradley died on 8 April 1981, in New York City of a cardiac arrhythmia, a few minutes after receiving an award from the National Institute of Social Sciences. He is buried at Arlington National Cemetery, next to his two wives.

== Recognition and legacy ==
Bradley's posthumous autobiography, A General's Life, was published in 1983. Bradley began the book but found writing difficult, and hired writer Clay Blair to help shape the work. After Bradley's death, Blair continued the writing, using Bradley's first-person voice. The resulting book is also based on Blair's interviews of people in Bradley's circles, and on Bradley's personal papers.

Bradley is known for saying, "Ours is a world of nuclear giants and ethical infants. We know more about war than about peace, more about killing than we know about living."

On 12 February 2010, the U.S. House of Representatives, the Missouri Senate, the Missouri House, the County of Randolph and the City of Moberly recognized Bradley's birthday as General Omar Nelson Bradley Day.

On 5 May 2000, the United States Postal Service issued a series of Distinguished Soldiers stamps in which Bradley was honored.

Hometown honors

In 2014, Moberly High School named its baseball field "General Omar Bradley Field", honoring their famous alumnus.

Bradley Leadership Symposia have been held in Moberly, honoring him as a teacher of young officers.

The General Omar Bradley Memorial, Library, and Museum, in Moberly, are dedicate to honor his "legacy of leadership, integrity, and service to the nation."

Namesakes

Bradley Elementary School in Fort Leavenworth, Kansas is named in his honor. (Note: Bradley Elementary School is one of four schools in the Fort Leavenworth Unified School District 207. The other schools are also named after renowned Army generals - MacArthur, Eisenhower and Patton.)

The U.S. Army's Bradley Fighting Vehicle was named after General Bradley.

== Summary of service ==
=== Assignment history ===
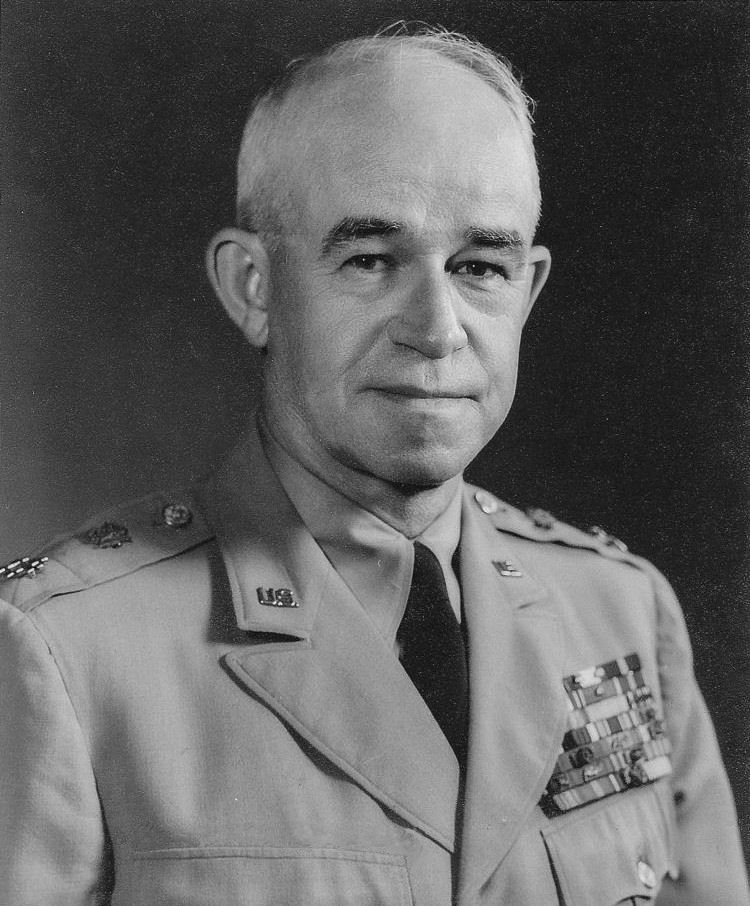
Omar Bradley, General of the Army

- 1 August 1911: Cadet, United States Military Academy, West Point
- 12 June 1915: 14th Infantry Regiment
- 10 September 1919: ROTC professor, South Dakota State College
- 13 September 1920: Instructor, United States Military Academy
- 15 September 1924: Infantry School Student, Fort Benning, Georgia
- 1 October 1925: Battalion Commander, 27th Infantry Regiment
- 10 June 1927: Office of National Guard and Reserve Affairs, Hawaiian Department
- 31 August 1928: Student, Command and General Staff School
- 1 August 1929: Instructor, United States Army Infantry School, Fort Benning, Georgia
- 18 August 1933: Student, United States Army War College
- 30 June 1934: Plans and Training Officer, United States Military Academy
- 1 June 1938: War Department General Staff, G-1 Chief of Operations Branch and Assistant Secretary of the General Staff
- 5 March 1941: Commandant, U.S. Army Infantry School, Fort Benning, Georgia
- 19 February 1942: Commanding General, 82nd Infantry Division
- 27 June 1942: Commanding General, 28th Infantry Division
- 24 February 1943: Personal representative in the field for Commanding General, North Africa Theater of Operations (NATO)
- 6 March 1943: Deputy Commander, II Corps
- 16 April 1943: Commanding General, II Corps, North Africa and Sicily
- 9 September 1943: Commanding General, Field Forces European Theater
- 28 January 1944: Commanding General, First Army
- 1 August 1944: Commanding General, 12th Army Group
- 12 July 1945: 12th Army Group disestablished, returned to United States
- 15 August 1945: Administrator of Veterans Affairs, Veterans Administration
- 1 December 1947: Furlough
- 7 February 1948: United States Army Chief of Staff
- 15 August 1949: Chairman of the Joint Chiefs of Staff
- 19 August 1953: Remained on active duty without an assignment

=== Orders, decorations and medals ===
==== United States ====
Defense Distinguished Service Medal
Army Distinguished Service Medal with three oak leaf clusters
Navy Distinguished Service Medal
Silver Star
Legion of Merit with oak leaf cluster
Bronze Star Medal
Presidential Medal of Freedom
Mexican Border Service Medal
World War I Victory Medal
Army of Occupation of Germany Medal
American Defense Service Medal
American Campaign Medal
European-African-Middle Eastern Campaign Medal with Arrowhead device, one silver and two bronze campaign stars
World War II Victory Medal
Army of Occupation Medal with "Germany" clasp
National Defense Service Medal with oak leaf cluster

- Combat Infantryman Badge (honorary)
- Army Staff Identification Badge
- Four Overseas Service Bars

==== Foreign orders ====
- Grand Cross, Legion of Honour (France)
- Grand Cross, Order of the Crown (Belgium)
- Grand Cross, Order of the Oak Crown (Luxembourg)
- Grand Cross, Order of George I (Greece)
- Grand Cross, Order of the Phoenix (Greece)
- Grand Cross, Military Order of Savoy (Italy)
- Honorary Knight Commander of the Order of the Bath (United Kingdom)
- Grand Officer, Order of the Liberator (Argentina)
- Grand Officer, Order of Military Merit (Brazil)
- Grand Officer, Order of Orange-Nassau (Netherlands)
- Commander, Order of the White Lion (Czechoslovakia)
- Commander of the Order of Ouissam Alaouite (Morocco)
- Commander's Cross of the Order of Polonia Restituta (Poland)
- Order of Suvorov First Class (Union of Soviet Socialist Republics)
- Order of Kutuzov First Class (Union of Soviet Socialist Republics)

==== Foreign decorations and medals ====
- French Croix de guerre with silver-gilt palm
- War Cross WWII (Belgium) with palm
- Czechoslovak War Cross 1939–1945
- Luxembourg War Cross
- Queen Elizabeth II Coronation Medal

=== Dates of rank ===
No insignia	Cadet, United States Military Academy: 1 August 1911
No pin insignia in 1915	Second Lieutenant, United States Army: 12 June 1915
	First Lieutenant, United States Army: 1 July 1916
	Captain, United States Army: 15 May 1917
	Temporary Major, National Army: 17 June 1918 to 22 January 1920
	Major, National Army: 1 July 1920
	Captain, Regular Army (reverted to permanent rank*): 4 November 1922
	Major, Regular Army: 25 June 1924
	Lieutenant Colonel, Regular Army: 26 July 1936
	Brigadier General, Army of the United States: 24 February 1941
	Major General, Army of the United States: 15 February 1942
	Lieutenant General, Army of the United States: 2 June 1943
	Colonel, Regular Army: 1 October 1943**
	Brigadier General, Regular Army: 1 September 1943**
	Major General, Regular Army: 8 September 1944
	General, Army of the United States: 12 March 1945
	General, Regular Army: 31 January 1949***
	General of the Army, Regular Army: 22 September 1950

* – Discharged as Major and appointed Captain on 4 November 1922; acts 30 June 1922, and 14 September 1922

** – Bradley's effective date for permanent brigadier general in the Regular Army is earlier than his effective date of promotion for permanent colonel. While serving as a temporary lieutenant general in early 1943, Bradley was notified that he would be promoted to permanent colonel with an effective date of 1 October 1943. At the time, promotions to permanent brigadier and major general had been withheld for more than two years, except for Delos C. Emmons, Henry H. Arnold, and Dwight Eisenhower. President Franklin D. Roosevelt lifted the moratorium after Bradley was notified that he would be promoted to colonel, but before the 1 October effective date.

In determining whom to promote after the lifting of Roosevelt's moratorium, Marshall consulted with Eisenhower, and they agreed to promote Bradley and several others. Marshall and Eisenhower then arranged the effective dates of promotion to brigadier general based on where they wanted each of the individuals selected to rank in terms of seniority. Bradley's date of rank for permanent brigadier general was then set as 1 September 1943—even though this was before his 1 October 1943, effective date for promotion to colonel—based on where Eisenhower and Marshall wanted Bradley to fall in terms of seniority as a brigadier general.

Bradley's and the other promotions to brigadier general on which Marshall and Eisenhower had conferred were not acted on until mid-October 1943 because Congress had to approve a waiver for those generals, including Bradley, who did not yet have 28 years of service. As a result, his 1 October 1943, date for promotion to permanent colonel was allowed to remain in effect. When Congress acted in mid-October to approve Bradley's time in service waiver and promotion to permanent brigadier general, his effective date for brigadier general was backdated to 1 September 1943. The 1 September 1943, date for permanent brigadier general enabled Bradley to line up with his peers where Marshall and Eisenhower intended for purposes of seniority.

The effective postdated (and then backdated) date of rank for Bradley's promotion to permanent brigadier general—1 September 1943—thus came before the effective postdated date of rank for his promotion to colonel—1 October1943.

*** - Pursuant to the 26 June 1948 Act of Congress, 62 Stat. 791, he was authorized to be appointed to the “permanent” grade of General, as opposed to the “temporary” appointment that was standard for 3- and 4-star US officers. As the AUS was, by definition, a temporary component of the U.S. Army, but his appointment as a Regular 4-star general was not effective until 31 January 1949, the historical record is thus unclear as to exactly when the Army executed the permanent appointment authorized by Pub.L. 62 Stat. 791. If not executed retroactively prior to 31 January 1949, then his appointment as a Regular 4-star would be “permanent” as opposed to the standard “temporary” grade. In any case, his subsequent appointment to 5-star grade rendered this appointment to 4-stars as merely a footnote to history.

== End notes ==
Military offices
Preceded by Courtney Hodges	Commandant of the United States Army Infantry School; 1941–1942	Succeeded by Leven Allen
Preceded by Newly activated organization	Commanding General 82nd Infantry Division; March–June 1942	Succeeded by Matthew Ridgway
Preceded by Garesche Ord	Commanding General 28th Infantry Division; 1942–1943	Succeeded by Lloyd Brown
Preceded by George Patton	Commanding General II Corps; April–September 1943	Succeeded by John Lucas
Preceded by George Grunert	Commanding General First Army; 1943–1944	Succeeded by Courtney Hodges
Preceded by Dwight Eisenhower	Chief of Staff of the United States Army; 1948–1949	Succeeded by Joseph Collins
Preceded by Newly activated organization	Chairman of the NATO Military Committee; 1949–1951	Succeeded by Etienne Baele
Preceded by William Leahy	Chairman of the Joint Chiefs of Staff; 1949–1953	Succeeded by Arthur Radford
Political offices
Preceded by Frank Hines	Administrator of Veterans Affairs; 1945–1948	Succeeded by Carl Gray
Awards
Preceded by Billy Graham	Recipient of the Sylvanus Thayer Award; 1973	Succeeded by Robert Murphy
