= Commission on Veterans' Pensions =

The U.S. President’s Commission on Veterans’ Pensions, commonly known as the Bradley Commission after its chairman General Omar N. Bradley, was established by Executive Order 10588 on January 14, 1955, and concluded its business after submitting its final report to President Dwight D. Eisenhower in April 1956. Most of the work of the Commission was done by its staff under the direction of the Executive Director, Major General Ernest M. Brannon, and the Technical Adviser, Michael March.

The Commission was charged with studying different types of benefits which had been granted to veterans. These included financial benefits such as pensions; educational benefits such as vocational rehabilitation and student aid; and employment benefits such as job security, insurance and reemployment rights. The Commission did not study hospital treatment or other medical benefits.

In the course of its work, the staff collected extensive information from various government agencies which dealt with veterans. Of particular importance was the U.S. Veterans Administration. Other agencies which assisted the Commission included the Labor and Defense Departments, the Social Security Administration, and the Railroad Retirement Board. The staff also made surveys of randomly selected veterans in order to develop statistical analyses of the use and effectiveness of various benefit programs.

The studies compiled by the staff pertained to all major areas of non-medical veterans benefits and included studies of the historical background of benefits, how benefits were administered, eligibility requirements, distinctions between service-connected and non-service-connected benefits, and benefits granted to survivors of veterans. The staff even studied benefits granted by the Canadian government in order to compare them with U.S. benefits. These studies were submitted to Congress by the Commission and were published in 16 volumes by the House Committee on Veterans Affairs.
