= Philippe Baele =

Belgian physician

Philippe Baele (born June 16, 1951) is a Belgian anaesthesiologist and medicine professor. After degrees in medicine and anaesthesiology at Université Catholique de Louvain (Belgium) and work experience in the Mayo Clinic (Minnesota, US), he has held various positions in Belgium (as university professor, practitioner, and expert for the government), in Argentina and Benin (as visiting professor), and in the World Federation of Societies of Anaesthesiologists (as a member of the Executive Committee). Best known among his works are his seminal articles on blood transfusion and his commitment to the development of medicine in the Third World.
