= Etienne Baele =

Belgian politician

- Born: 1891
- Died: 1975 (aged 83–84)
- Military career
- Allegiance: Belgium
- Branch: Belgian Army
- Service years: 1912–1952
- Rank: Lieutenant general
- Commands: Chairman of the NATO Chief of Staffs' Committee
- Conflicts: World War I World War II

Lt. General Etienne Baele (29 April 1891 – 1975) was chief of staff of the Belgian army and chairman of the NATO Military Committee from 1951 to 1952.
