= HDMS Peder Skram (1908) =

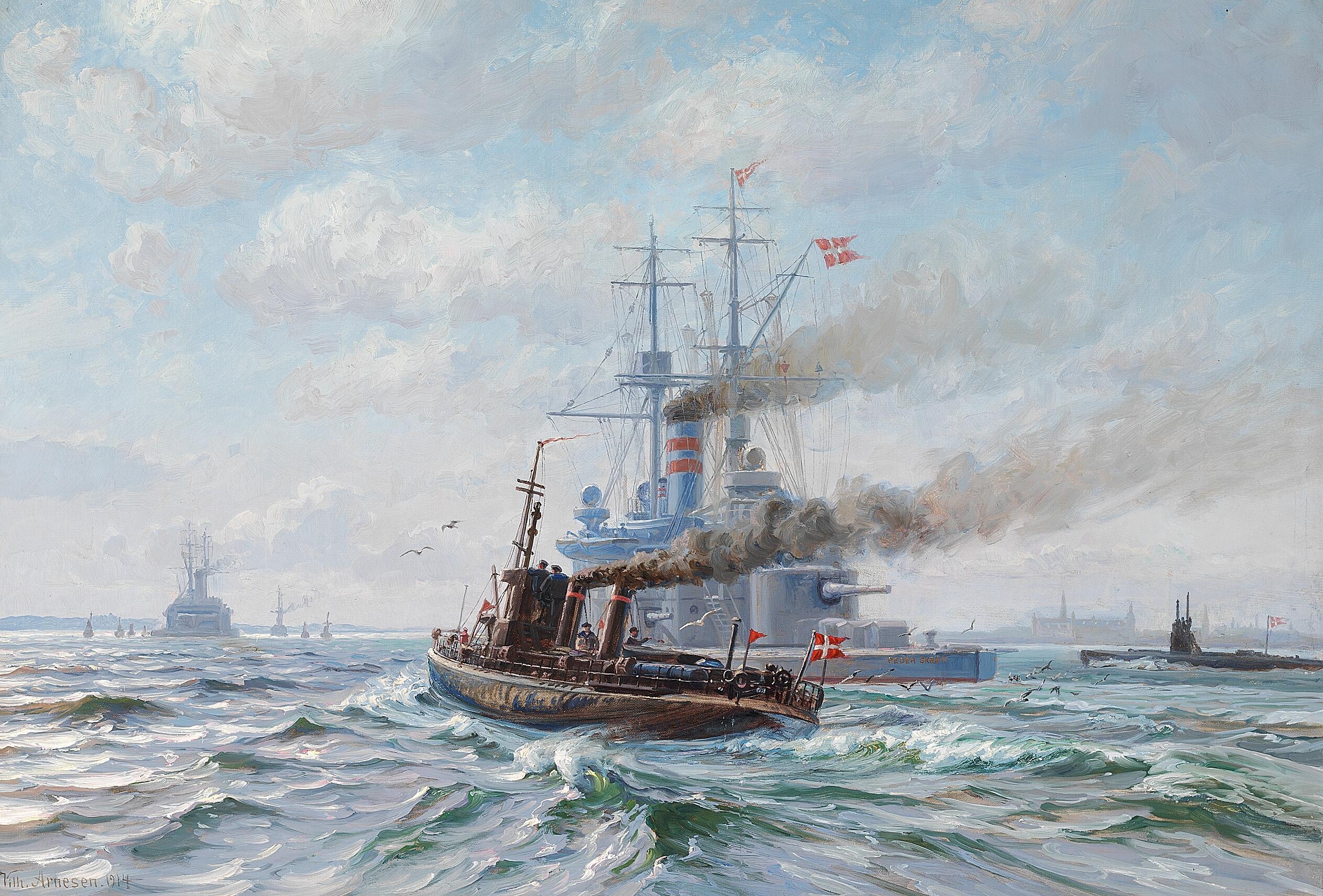
- Peder Skram and other ships of the Danish fleet underway, c. 1914

History

Denmark
- Name: Peder Skram
- Builder: Orlogsværftet
- Laid down: 25 April 1905
- Launched: 2 May 1908
- Commissioned: 24 September 1909
- Fate: Scuttled, 1943

History

Germany
- Name: Adler
- Acquired: 1943
- Commissioned: 1944
- Fate: Sunk, April 1945; Raised, sold for scrap 1949

General characteristics
- Displacement: 3,785 long tons (3,846 t)
- Length: 87.4 m (286 ft 9 in)
- Beam: 15.7 m (51 ft 6 in)
- Draft: 5 m (16 ft 5 in)
- Installed power: 2 × Thornycroft boilers; 5,400 ihp (4,000 kW)
- Propulsion: 2 × triple-expansion steam engines; 2 × screw propellers
- Speed: 16 knots (30 km/h; 18 mph)
- Complement: 257–258
- Armament: 2 × 240 mm (9.4 in) guns; 4 × 150 mm (5.9 in) guns; 10 × 75 mm (3.0 in) guns; 2 × 37 mm (1.5 in) guns; 4 × 457 mm (18 in) torpedo tubes
- Armor: Belt armor: 155 to 195 mm (6.1 to 7.7 in); Deck: 45 to 65 mm (1.8 to 2.6 in); Conning tower: 190 mm (7.5 in); Gun turrets: 160 to 190 mm (6.3 to 7.5 in); Barbettes: 185 mm (7.3 in)

HDMS Peder Skram was the third and final member of the Herluf Trolle class of coastal defense ships built for the Royal Danish Navy. The Herluf Trolle class was built in response to a naval construction program in neighboring Imperial Germany. The Danish ships were built in the late 1890s and early 1900s; Peder Skram was delayed significantly compared to her sisters, and was laid down in 1905, after her two sister ships had already been completed. The ships were armed with a main battery of two 240 mm (9.4 in) guns and were capable of a top speed of 15.5 knots (28.7 km/h; 17.8 mph).

Peder Skram took part in routine training exercises and cruises in northern European waters in the years between her completion in 1909 and the start of World War I in 1914. She thereafter served as part of Denmark's neutrality patrols during the war, and she was involved in an incident between a British submarine and two German torpedo boats in 1915. The 1920s and 1930s saw intermittent activity for Peder Skram, mainly due to tight naval budgets that precluded significant operations. She was reactivated following the start of World War II in 1939, but saw no action when Germany invaded Denmark in April 1940. Initially permitted to retain its ships, the Danish fleet scuttled them in 1943 to prevent Germany from seizing them. The Germans nevertheless raised Peder Skram and commissioned her under the name Adler for use as a stationary anti-aircraft battery in Kiel. Sunk there by Allied bombers in 1945, she was raised again after the war and returned to Denmark, where she was eventually scrapped in 1949.

== Design ==
By the end of the 19th century, which had seen Denmark's decline from a major navy before the devastating Battle of Copenhagen in 1801 to a minor coastal defense force by the 1890s, the Royal Danish Navy was primarily concerned with countering the naval strength of its neighbor, Imperial Germany. In the early 1890s, the Germans had completed eight coastal defense ships of the Siegfried and Odin classes, prompting the Danish government to consider strengthening their fleet in 1894 in response. As work on the design began, the designers reviewed the lessons of the First Sino-Japanese War, which was fought over the course of 1894 and into 1895. Funds for the first ship, Herluf Trolle, were authorized in 1896, but the weak Danish financial position delayed work on a second vessel—Olfert Fischer—until 1900 and the third member of the class, Peder Skram, until 1905. Revisions to the design were carried out by the time the last ship was begun, leading to some differences in detail.

=== Characteristics ===
Plan and profile of the Herluf Trolle class

Peder Skram was 87.4 m (286 ft 9 in) long overall, with a beam of 15.7 m (51 ft 6 in) and an average draft of 5 m (16 ft 5 in). She displaced 3,785 long tons (3,846 t) at full load. As the ships were intended to operate in Denmark's shallow coastal waters, they had a low freeboard. They had a shore forecastle forward to improve seakeeping. Peder Skram had a fairly large superstructure that included an armored conning tower. Her crew amounted to 257–258 officers and enlisted men.

The ship's propulsion system consisted of a pair of vertical triple-expansion steam engines that drove a pair of screw propellers. Steam was provided by six water-tube boilers that were vented through a single funnel placed amidships. Her machinery was rated to produce 5,400 indicated horsepower (4,000 kW) for a top speed of 15.9 knots (29.4 km/h; 18.3 mph). She carried up to 271 long tons (275 t) of coal, which allowed the ship to steam for 2,620 nautical miles (4,850 km; 3,020 mi) at an economical speed of 9 knots (17 km/h; 10 mph).

The ship's armament was centered on a main battery of two 240 mm (9.4 in) 43-caliber guns mounted individually in gun turrets, one forward and the other aft. These were supported by a secondary battery of four 150 mm (5.9 in) 50-caliber guns, which were placed in casemates in the side of the hull. Close-range defense against torpedo boats was provided by a light battery of ten 75 mm (3.0 in) guns and two 37 mm (1.5 in) guns. She also carried four 457 mm (18 in) torpedo tubes that were submerged in the hull, one in the bow, one in the stern, and the other two to either broadside.

Peder Skram's armor belt was 155 to 195 mm (6.1 to 7.7 in) thick, and was connected to the armor deck, which was 45 to 65 mm (1.8 to 2.6 in) thick. Her main battery turrets received 190 mm (7.5 in) of armor on their faces, 175 mm (6.9 in) on their sides, and 160 mm (6.3 in) on their rears. The turrets were supported by barbettes that were 185 mm (7.3 in) thick. Her casemate battery was covered by 140 mm (5.5 in) of armor plate, and her conning tower received 190 mm (7.5 in) plating.

== Service history ==
Peder Skram was built at the Orlogsværftet shipyard in Copenhagen. She was laid down on 25 April 1905, and she was launched on 2 May 1908. After completing fitting out work and initial sea trials in the Skagerrak, the ship was commissioned into active service on 24 September 1909. By 1910, all three of the Herluf Trolle-class ships had been completed, and they operated in the summer training squadron together for the first time that year. The ship also visited Bergen and Odda in Norway that year. She remained in service with her sisters in 1911. In addition to training duties in 1911, Peder Skram visited Stockholm, Sweden. She served in the winter training squadron over the winter of 1911–1912 in company with the coastal defense ship Skjold. In May 1912, King Frederik VIII of Denmark died while visiting Germany; Olfert Fischer was initially sent to escort the royal yacht, Dannebrog as she carried his remains back to Denmark, and Peder Skram joined the squadron on 1 June. In early 1913, Peder Skram visited the Hook of Holland and Rotterdam in the Netherlands, before returning to routine training duties with her two sister ships later in the year. Peder Skram was laid up over the winter of 1913–1914. In 1914, she was reactivated for the annual training cycle, which began with a visit to Kalmar, Sweden.

=== World War I ===
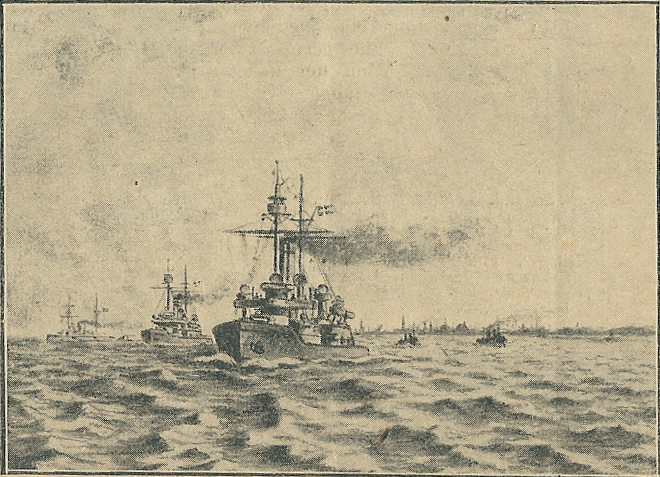
Sketch of the Danish fleet in 1914

After World War I broke out in July 1914, Denmark established the Sikringsstyrken (security force) on 31 July to enforce its neutrality during the conflict. The Danish fleet, which at that time consisted of Peder Skram and her two sisters, fifteen torpedo boats, seven submarines, and six mine-warfare vessels, employed a strategy of laying minefields in its territorial waters to prevent belligerent ships from entering. The surface warships, including Peder Skram, patrolled the narrow and shallow waterways, where they would be difficult to attack in the event that Denmark was brought into the conflict. They were divided into two units: 1st Squadron, which was to defend Copenhagen, and 2nd Squadron, which patrolled the Great Belt. Peder Skram and her sisters alternated between the two units as needed, such as when vessels needed to withdraw for maintenance. Peder Skram initially served in the 1st Squadron, based in the Øresund.

On the night of 18–19 August 1915, the British submarine HMS E13 attempted to pass through the Danish Straits, but ran aground off Saltholm. At that time, Peder Skram was the flagship of the 1st Squadron, which was anchored some 15 nautical miles (28 km; 17 mi) to the north of Saltholm. Initial contact was made by Danish patrol boats, which informed the British that they had twenty-four hours to withdraw before they would be interned. The ships of 1st Squadron were sent south to oversee the British attempts to refloat the submarine and prevent any German naval forces from interfering, which would have been a violation of Denmark's neutrality. At around that time, the German torpedo boats SMS G132 and SMS G134 arrived and began to attack E13. The Danish ships, including Peder Skram, cleared for action, but did not open fire; eventually, the torpedo boat HDMS Søulven placed herself between the German vessels and the British submarine and the Germans withdrew. The Danish fleet had proved incapable of enforcing their neutrality.

For the remainder of the war, Peder Skram alternated between the two squadrons, but saw no further significant activity. Following the end of the war in November 1918, the Sikringsstyrken was disbanded on 12 December and Peder Skram was laid up in reserve.

=== Interwar period ===
In the aftermath of World War I, the Danish naval budget was significantly reduced, which kept much of the fleet laid up due to a lack of funds. Peder Skram was commissioned in October 1920 to serve as the command ship during training exercises with the fleet's torpedo boats and submarines, which were held off Southern Jutland. In late November, Peder Skram and the rest of the squadron visited Gothenburg, Sweden. After returning to Denmark, Peder Skram was decommissioned again in February 1921. She was reactivated in August for another round of training exercises, which lasted until January 1922. Later that year, she joined Olfert Fischer for the summer training squadron. She embarked on a cruise to visit Stockholm and Danzig, Germany. Olfert Fischer joined her for the trip, and the two ships carried an Orlogsværftet H-Maskinen HM-1 aircraft for evaluation. Further budget reductions curtailed the ship's activity even further, and from 1922 to 1929, she did not go to sea at all. During this period, she periodically served as a stationary command ship.

In 1929, Peder Skram was recommissioned to serve as a training ship in company with the training vessel Niels Juel, but this period of training naval reserve officers lasted just a few months, and by late 1929, she was again laid up in reserve. She remained out of service for another five years, which was interrupted by a short period in commission in August and September 1934. She was recommissioned again in May 1935, this time to join the escort for the new royal yacht, also named Dannebrog, to Stockholm for the marriage of Princess Ingrid of Sweden to the Danish crown prince, Frederik. The Danish naval budget was so tight that Peder Skram proceeded most of the way on her own at the economical speed of 8 knots (15 km/h; 9.2 mph) to save coal. She rendezvoused with the rest of the squadron, which consisted of the torpedo boats Glenten, Hvalen, and Laxen, north of Öland, Sweden. On the way home, she was again detached very soon after leaving Stockholm, again steaming at 8 knots. After arriving home, she was laid up once more, and remained out of service for the next four years. With tensions in Europe again on the rise by 1939, Peder Skram was recommissioned in May to form the core of a training squadron along with Niels Juel. During this period, she conducted speed tests and reached a maximum rate of 15.9 knots, the same speed she had made when first completed some thirty years before. On 7 July, Peder Skram was laid up again at the Holmen Naval Base.

=== World War II ===
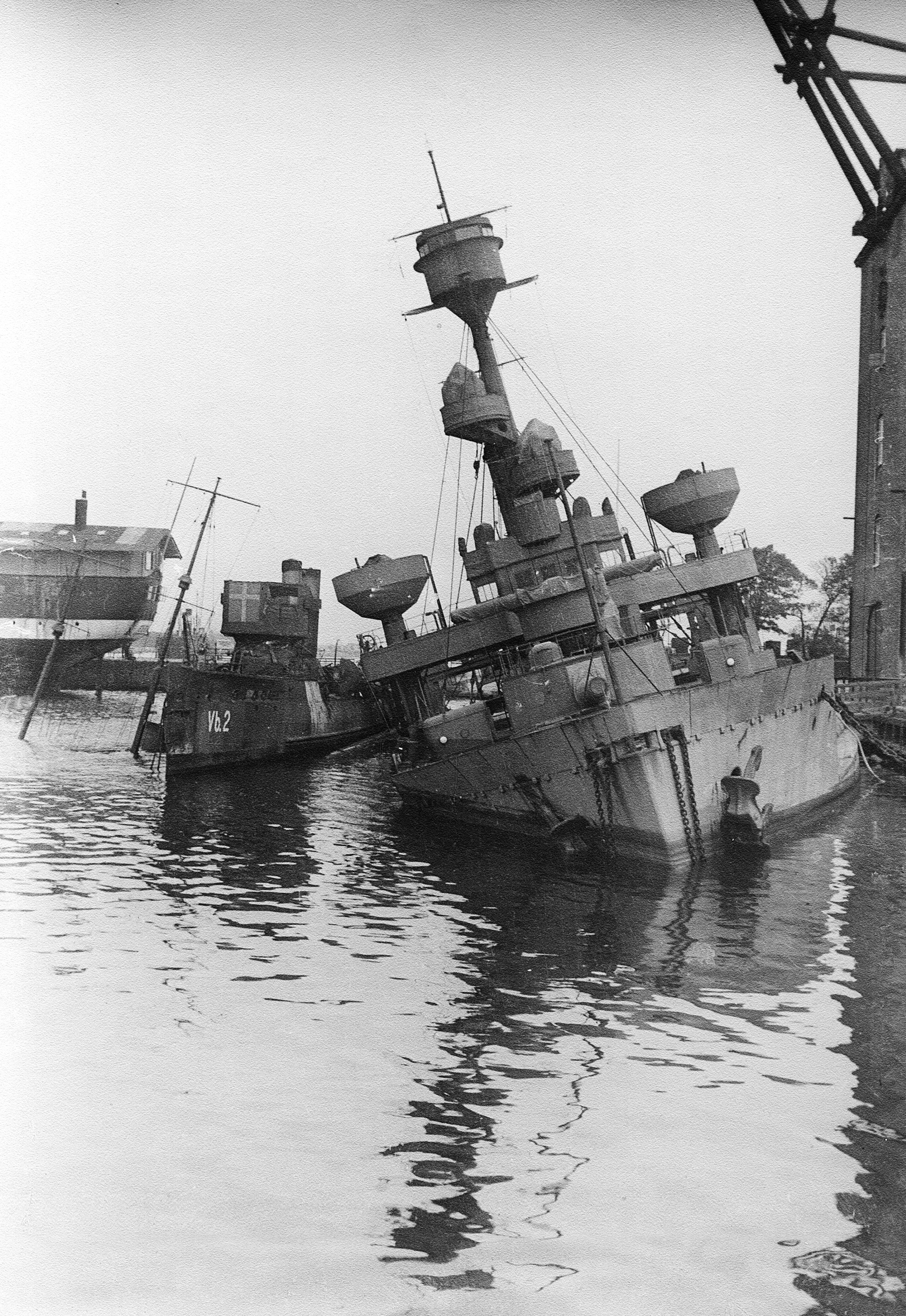
Peder Skram sunk in 1943

In the early hours of 1 September 1939, Germany invaded Poland, starting World War II. The Danish Navy ordered Peder Skram to begin embarking ammunition and stores, and placed her on a 48-hour notice for steam, though she was not formally recommissioned until 20 September. At that point, she was assigned to the reconstituted Sikringsstyrken, though she and Niels Juel were the only major warships still in the fleet's inventory. They were joined by six torpedo boats and five submarines, along with several smaller vessels, all based at Aarhus. This force was initially concentrated to provide the best chance the vessels could support each other, given Denmark's marked inferiority to any of the belligerent navies. The Danish government had signed a non-aggression pact with Germany in May 1939, and so adopted a passive stance once the war began. During the winter of 1939–1940, Germany demanded the Danish fleet be dispersed to guard against British submarines attempting to pass through the Danish Straits, and the Danes complied; Peder Skram and three torpedo boats were detached. When Germany invaded Denmark on 9 April 1940, Peder Skram was based in Frederikshavn, and saw no action before the Danish government surrendered, some six hours after the invasion began.

The German occupation initially permitted the Danish government to remain in power, albeit under German direction; this included the Danish fleet, which was permitted to keep some vessels in commission. Peder Skram was moved to Horsens, where she was decommissioned on 13 April. She was moved back to Holmen on 11 June 1941, and in 1942, she was recommissioned for active service into 1943. That year, she was laid up at Holmen. By that time, the Danish Resistance had increased its overt acts against the occupiers, prompting the Germans to launch Operation Safari to neutralize the Danish armed forces and seize military and naval equipment. Vice Admiral A. H. Vedel, the commander in chief of the Danish fleet, had already issued secret orders that all ships should either attempt to reach neutral Sweden or to scuttle their ships if Germany attempted to seize them. To this end, many ships of the fleet were secretly supplied with scuttling charges, but Peder Skram had been decommissioned and employed as a stationary command ship in Copenhagen, so she was not provisioned with explosives. The Germans carried out Operation Safari on 29 August 1943, but the Danes were able to scuttle all of the ships in Copenhagen, including Peder Skram, before the Germans could stop them. Peder Skram took on a list of 20 degrees to starboard and sank to the harbor bottom, though most of her superstructure remained above the water.

The Germans later raised Peder Skram, since she had not been significantly damaged in the scuttling. Her 150 mm guns were removed for use as a coastal artillery battery on the island of Fanø, but she retained her main battery guns. Later in 1943, she was towed to Kiel, Germany, for a refit that included the installation of a few 20 mm (0.79 in) anti-aircraft guns. She was recommissioned under the name Adler for use as a floating anti-aircraft battery in the Kieler Förde off Friedrichsort in 1944. She was also used as a stationary training vessel. The Germans planned a more extensive refit that year that included the installation of heavy 105 mm (4.1 in) anti-aircraft guns, medium 40 mm (1.6 in) guns, and additional lighter 20 mm guns, but the work was never carried out. British RAF reconnaissance aircraft spotted the ship off Friedrichsort in January 1945, and she was damaged in a bombing raid in April that forced her crew to run her aground to avoid sinking. She was discovered in that condition by occupying forces in May, following Germany's surrender.

With the war over, the Danish salvage company Em. Z. Svitzer sent the salvage ship Garm to recover Peder Skram in August 1945. The crew worked for three days to seal the hull and refloat the ship, before towing her back to Holmen Naval Base in Copenhagen. She remained there for the next few years, waiting to be scrapped. Her armored conning tower was removed between late 1948 and early 1949, being placed first at the Danish naval academy and then later moved to Risø in 1961. In the meantime, Peder Skram was sold to the ship breaking company H. J. Hansen on 1 April 1949, and she was broken up at their facility at Odense later that year. The ship's foremast was preserved, and remains at their facility.
