= HDMS Skjold (1896) =

- Skjold early in her career

History

Denmark
- Name: Skjold
- Ordered: 1893
- Builder: Orlogsværftet
- Laid down: January 1894
- Launched: 8 May 1896
- Commissioned: 25 May 1897
- Out of service: 22 December 1918
- Stricken: 21 May 1929
- Fate: Broken up

General characteristics
- Displacement: 2,160 long tons (2,190 t)
- Length: 69.24 m (227 ft 2 in) long between perpendiculars
- Beam: 11.6 m (38 ft 1 in)
- Draft: 4.16 m (13 ft 8 in)
- Installed power: 4 × Thornycroft boilers; 2,400 ihp (1,800 kW)
- Propulsion: 2 × triple-expansion steam engines; 2 × screw propellers
- Speed: 14 knots (26 km/h; 16 mph)
- Complement: 138
- Armament: 1 × 240 mm (9.4 in) gun; 3 × 120 mm (4.7 in) guns; 4 × 3-pounder guns; 1 × Hotchkiss revolver cannon
- Armor: Belt armor: 178 to 228 mm (7 to 9 in); Deck: 51 mm (2 in); Gun turret: 254 mm (10 in)

HDMS Skjold was an armored coastal defense ship built for the Royal Danish Navy in the 1890s, the only member of her class. The naval command had wanted a larger vessel, but parliamentary reluctance to fund a more expensive vessel forced the navy to compromise with a smaller ship. As she was intended to serve as part of the defense of Copenhagen, she was fairly small and had a shallow draft, but was heavily armed and armored for her size. She carried a single 240 mm (9.4 in) gun in an armored gun turret forward, and had a complete armor belt.

She took part in many of the routine training exercises in the late 1890s, 1900s, and early 1910s and visited a number of foreign ports in northern Europe during this period. Skjold was assigned to the security forces that guarded Danish neutrality during World War I, helping to guard the capital at Copenhagen and patrol the Great Belt. The ship was decommissioned in December 1918 after the war, and she remained out of service for the following decade. She was eventually sold for scrap in 1929.

== Design ==
By the end of the 19th century, which had seen Denmark's decline from a major navy before the devastating Battle of Copenhagen in 1801 to a minor coastal defense force by the 1890s, the Royal Danish Navy was primarily concerned with countering the naval strength of its neighbor, Imperial Germany. Between the 1860s and 1880s, Denmark built five coastal defense ships, which were employed in an integrated coastal defense network for the island of Zealand, where the capital at Copenhagen lay. Skjold was intended to guard the southern approach to Copenhagen, and because she had a shallow draft, she was expected to withdraw through the Kalveboderne between Zealand and Amager in the event of a determined attack.

=== Development ===
By the 1880s, the advent of the modern protected cruiser exemplified by the Chilean cruiser Esmeralda, had convinced the Danish naval command to stop building armored coastal defense ships, since large guns had increased in power to the point that conventional armor could no longer defeat them. As a result, the Danish Navy ordered a series of small protected cruisers, including Hekla, Gejser, and Valkyrien. The dominance of the lightly armored but heavily armed cruiser proved to be brief, and by 1889, the Danish naval command had decided to return to armored warships, owing to the development of nickel-steel alloys that led to Harvey armor. That year, the navy requested funding for a new armored coastal defense ship of around 3,500 long tons (3,600 t), and the Orlogsværftet shipyard in Copenhagen prepared several proposals. Instead, the Danish parliament rejected the request and authorized funding to begin another cruiser, Hejmdal.

The navy requested a new coastal defense ship in 1890, which the parliament again rejected. The same pattern occurred in 1891. At the same time, the Imperial German Navy had begun working on the six coastal defense ships of the Siegfried class. Though these ships were intended to guard the shallow waters of the Elbe, the Danish naval command realized they could also be used effectively in Danish waters. Not willing to delay construction of a new coastal defense ship any longer, but still unable to secure parliamentary approval for the 3,500-ton ship, the navy opted for a smaller vessel. Parliament finally voted for the funds, and on 2 September 1892, the navy informed the design staff at the Orlogsværftet requesting detailed design drawings. The plan for the new ship was approved on 15 May 1893.

=== General characteristics and machinery ===
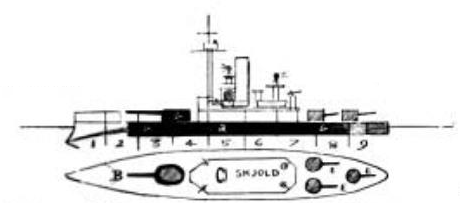
Plan and profile of Skjold

Skjold had a steel hull that was divided into watertight compartments and had a double bottom in the central portion, below the ammunition magazines and propulsion machinery spaces. The ship was 69.24 m (227 ft 2 in) long between perpendiculars, and 73.99 m (242 ft 9 in) long overall. She had a beam of 11.6 m (38 ft 1 in) and a maximum draft of 4.16 m (13 ft 8 in). She displaced 2,160 long tons (2,190 t) as designed. The ship had a low freeboard, as she was intended to operate in Denmark's internal waters. Her superstructure was minimal, consisting of a short upper deck structure and a small conning tower forward for the bridge.

The ship was completed with electric lighting and steam central heating. Skjold was fitted with two 900 mm (35 in) search lights; one was placed on the conning tower and the other was placed on a platform aft. Speaking tubes were used to relay orders from the bridge to the gun crews or elsewhere in the ship. Her crew amounted to 138 officers and enlisted men.

The ship's propulsion system consisted of two triple-expansion steam engines driving a pair of screw propellers. The engines were manufactured by the Danish shipyard Burmeister & Wain. Each engine was placed in its own watertight engine room. Steam was provided by four coal-fired Thornycroft boilers of the water-tube type, which were vented through a single tall funnel. The boilers, which were built by the Orlogsværftet, were capable of forced draft and were divided into two boiler rooms. A small auxiliary boiler was placed in the conning tower for heating when the main boilers were not in use. Skjold was the first capital ship of the Danish fleet to use Thornycroft boilers, which had previously been used experimentally in the small cruiser Gejser. Her engines were rated to produce 2,400 indicated horsepower (1,800 kW), for a top speed of 14 knots (26 km/h; 16 mph). She carried 109 long tons (111 t) of coal for her boilers.

=== Armament ===
The ship's main battery consisted of a single 240 mm (9.4 in) SK 40-caliber gun manufactured by Krupp in a rotating gun turret placed forward. The turret and mechanisms were of the Canet type. It was the first balanced turret of the Danish fleet; earlier, unbalanced turrets caused stability problems when trained to one side or another. The turret and ammunition hoist were electrically operated, though hydraulic power was used to assist manual training of the turret. The gun could engage targets out to a range of 9,800 m (32,200 ft), and had a rate of fire of one shot every two minutes. The gun was supplied with a total of fifty armor-piercing shells. The development of modern smokeless powder allowed the caliber of the gun to be reduced in comparison to earlier vessels while retaining the same ability to penetrate armor. The gun had a fixed loading angle of 2 degrees of elevation.

This gun was supported by a secondary battery of three 120 mm (4.7 in) Krupp guns, each mounted in individual gun Canet turrets, which were placed aft. The secondary turrets used electrical gun laying motors but were loaded manually. They had a range of 7,300 m (24,000 ft) and a rate of fire of five shots per minute. Each gun was supplied with 240 shells. For close-range defense against torpedo boats, the ship was armed with four 3-pounder guns and a single 1-pounder Hotchkiss revolver cannon.

=== Armor ===
Skjold was protected with Harvey armor; her belt armor was 175 to 225 mm (7 to 9 in) thick, and it ran for the entire length of her hull. The thicker portion of belt covered the amidships section, where it protected the magazines and propulsion machinery; it reduced at the bow and stern. It extended from 0.94 m (3 ft 1 in) above the waterline to 1.1 m (3 ft 7 in) below, and was backed by 110 mm (4.3 in) of teak, which was in turn backed by two layers of 11 mm (0.43 in) steel plating used to form the inner skin of the hull. Curiously, the armor used for the starboard side of the belt was manufactured by the French firm Schneider-Creusot, while the British firm Vickers provided the port-side armor plate. The central portion of her armor deck was 19 mm (0.75 in) thick, atop a layer of 32 mm (1.3 in) steel, and it also extended for the length of the ship. At the bow and stern, the deck reduced in thickness to 10 mm (0.39 in) on 26 mm (1.02 in) steel. It was attached to the top of the belt armor.

The main battery turret was protected with 200 mm (7.9 in) of armor plate, mounted on two layers of 25 mm (0.98 in) steel, but a different nickel-steel alloy was used for the turret. This variant was less prone to cracking than normal Harvey steel, but was more expensive, which limited its use to the turret and the conning tower. This armor was also manufactured by Schneider-Creusot. The turret roof consisted of two layers of armor plate, 19 mm atop 32 mm. The secondary gun turrets received 120 mm (4.7 in) of steel armor on their faces and sides; their roofs consisted of two layers of 13 mm steel. An armored tube with the same level of protection extended below the conning tower; all communication means from the bridge were conducted through this tube, including telegraph wires, speaking tubes, and control cables from the helm.

== Service history ==
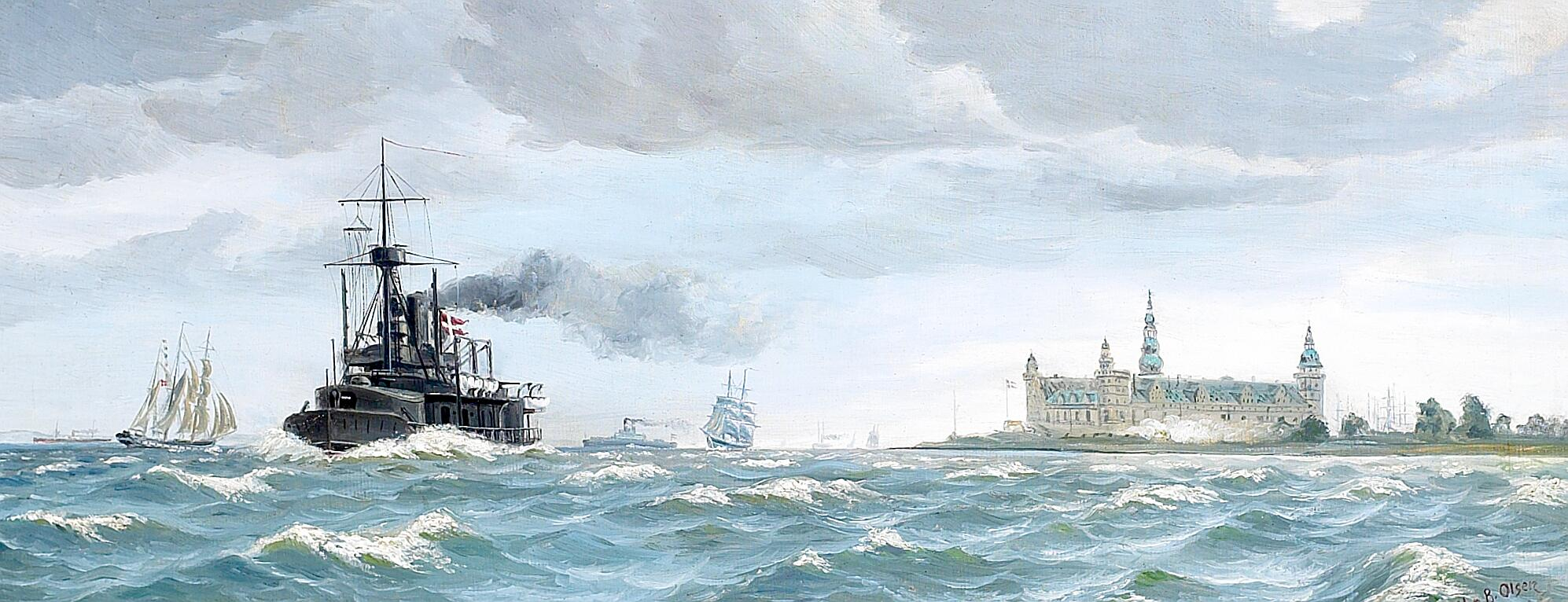
Painting of Skjold steaming off Kronborg

Construction of Skjold was authorized under the 1893–1894 naval budget. The ship was built at the Orlogsværftet shipyard in Copenhagen; her keel was laid down in January 1894, and she was launched on 8 May 1896. Work on the ship was completed in 1897, and she was placed in commission on 25 May. Throughout her early career, Skjold routinely took part in the annual summer training maneuvers in Danish waters with the rest of the active squadron. These training periods typically began in June or July and extended to September or October. She also made visits abroad, and cruised as far as the Bothnian Sea. This was in large part due to the ship's small size compared to the other coastal defense ships and cruisers, since her smaller crew meant it was less expensive to operate the vessel.

The ship's first voyage, begun shortly after her commissioning in late May 1897, saw her steam through the Skaggerak to visit Oslo, Norway. This was part of her initial sea trials, which lasted into June. Skjold was active for the summer training exercises held in 1898 and 1901. Both years also saw the ship participate in training cruises as part of the active squadron. During the 1898 cruise, she visited Riga in the Russian Empire, and in 1901, she visited Gävle, Sweden. Following the end of the 1901 maneuvers, Skjold was decommissioned on 28 September, but she was reactivated just two days later to take part in weapons tests for new high-explosive shells with the old gunboat Møen. The latter's 100 mm (3.9 in) guns were rigged to fire remotely, and her crew was transferred to Skjold for the tests. After three shots, Møen exploded and sank, presumably because one shell exploded in the gun, which caused a secondary explosion of the ship's magazine.

Skjold participated in the summer training squadrons in the years 1902, 1904, 1905, and 1906; those years, she also made visits to Kiel, Germany. She was also assigned to the 1908 training squadron, though she made no trips abroad that year. Beginning in 1909, she and the rest of the fleet conducted winter training exercises as well. This was stipulated in the Navy Act of 1909, which had the goal of increasing naval readiness. Skjold was also activated for the 1911–1912 winter training squadron, which also included the new coastal defense ship Peder Skram, several torpedo boats, and supporting minesweepers. She remained in service for the 1912 summer squadron, and over the winter of 1912–1913, she operated in company with the coastal defense ship Olfert Fischer.

=== World War I and fate ===
At the start of World War I at the end of July 1914, for which Denmark remained neutral, Skjold was initially laid up out of service. On 1 August, Denmark established the Sikringsstyrken (security force), which initially centered on the three Herluf Trolle-class coastal defense ships. Skjold was immediately ordered back to active service, and on 5 August she was recommissioned to lead the reserve force, which supported the 1st Squadron. A further three cruisers, four gunboats, eight torpedo boats, and fifteen patrol boats rounded out the reserve force. The unit was then designated the 2nd Squadron. The 1st Squadron operated in the Øresund to defend the approaches to Copenhagen, while the 2nd Squadron patrolled the Great Belt. Throughout the war, Skjold and the Herluf Trolle-class ships alternated between the 1st and 2nd Squadrons. On 22 November 1917, Skjold assisted the crew of a schooner that had run aground to the west of Stubbekøbing on the island of Falster. Over the winter of 1917–1918, Skjold was detached to conduct a training cruise; she necessarily remained in Danish waters and only visited local ports. On 22 December 1918, with the war now over, Skjold was again placed in reserve.

In the aftermath of World War I and through the 1920s, the Danish naval budget was significantly reduced, which kept much of the fleet laid up due to a lack of funds. Skjold remained in reserve from 1920 onward. During this period, some consideration was given to using Skjold as part of the coastal defenses of the islands of Falster and Møn. It was decided in the event of war, Skjold would be moored with her bow to the shore in the Grønsund, which would permit her three 120 mm guns to be used to support the coastal fortifications ashore. But as no war came, the ship remained quietly moored at the Holmen Naval Base in Copenhagen. Ultimately, Skjold was struck from the naval register on 21 May 1929 and thereafter sold to shipbreakers.
