= HDMS Niels Juel (1918) =

Royal Danish Navy training cruiser, 1923–1943

Coordinates: 54.4672°N 9.9667°E

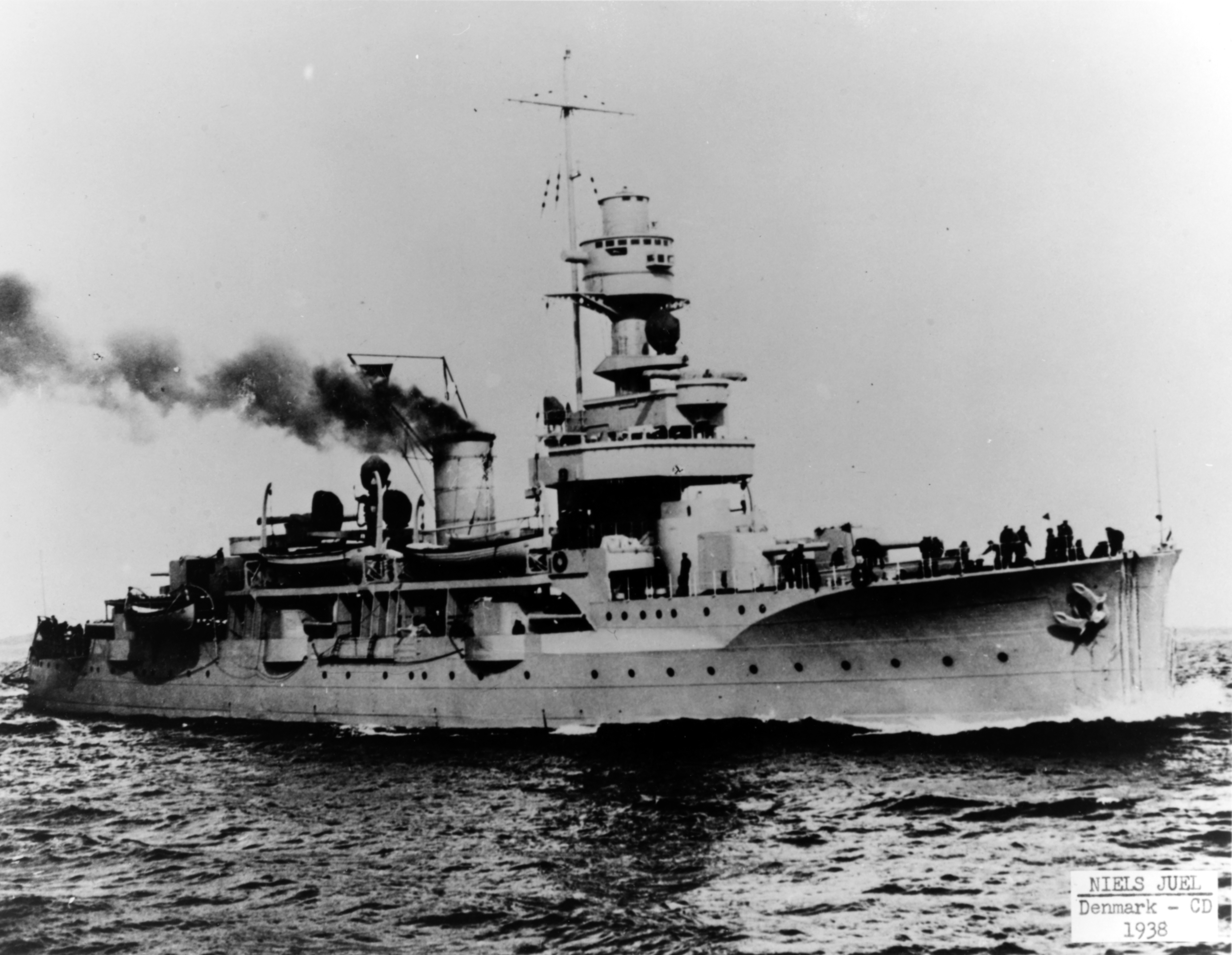
- Niels Juel circa 1938

History

Denmark
- Name: Niels Juel
- Namesake: Niels Juel
- Builder: Orlogsværftet, Copenhagen
- Laid down: 21 September 1914
- Launched: 3 July 1918
- Commissioned: 23 May 1923
- Stricken: 29 August 1943
- Captured: 29 August 1943
- Fate: Ran aground, 29 August 1943

Nazi Germany
- Name: Niels Juel
- Acquired: Refloated, October 1943
- Renamed: Nordland
- Stricken: 3 May 1945
- Fate: Sold for scrap, 1952

General characteristics
- Type: Coastal defence ship
- Displacement: 3,800 long tons (3,861 t) (standard)
- Length: 90 m (295 ft 3 in)
- Beam: 16.3 m (53 ft 6 in)
- Draught: 5 m (16 ft 5 in)
- Installed power: 4 Yarrow boilers; 6,000 ihp (4,500 kW)
- Propulsion: 2 shafts; 2 triple-expansion steam engines
- Speed: 14.5 knots (26.9 km/h; 16.7 mph)
- Range: 6,000 nmi (11,000 km; 6,900 mi) at 9 knots (17 km/h; 10 mph)
- Complement: 310–369
- Armament: 10 × 150 mm (5.9 in) guns; 2 × 57 mm (2.2 in) AA guns; 2 × 450 mm (17.7 in) torpedo tubes
- Armor: Belt: 155–195 mm (6.1–7.7 in); Deck: 55 mm (2.2 in); Gun shields: 50 mm (2.0 in); Conning tower: 170 mm (6.7 in); Bulkheads: 165 or 175 mm (6.5 or 6.9 in)

HDMS (Note: His Danish Majesty's Ship) Niels Juel was a training ship built for the Royal Danish Navy between 1914 and 1923. Originally designed before World War I as a monitor, construction was slowed by the war and she was redesigned as a training cruiser. Completed in 1923 she made training cruises to the Black and Mediterranean Seas, South America and numerous shorter visits to ports in northern Europe. The ship often served as a flagship and occasionally was used as a royal yacht for visits to overseas possessions and other countries.

Niels Juel was extensively modernized in the mid-1930s and remained operational after Nazi Germany occupied Denmark in 1940. When the Germans attempted to seize the Danish Fleet in August 1943, the ship attempted to escape to Sweden, but was attacked and damaged by German bombers. She was deliberately run aground by her crew to deny the ship to the Germans, but Niels Juel was not badly damaged. The ship was refloated several months later and repaired by the Germans. They renamed her Nordland and used her as a training ship. She was scuttled by them in May 1945 and her wreck was salvaged in 1952.

== Background ==
Niels Juel was originally intended to be an improved version of Peder Skram, a Herluf Trolle-class coastal defence ship. Like that class, she had a very low freeboard, and was intended to be armed with two 30.5-centimeter (12 in) guns in single gun turrets fore and aft of the superstructure and a secondary armament of eight 10.5-centimeter (4.1 in) guns. The Danes ordered the main guns and their turrets from Krupp of Germany in July, a month before the start of World War I, but the order was suspended when the war began. After being laid down in September 1914, construction of the ship was severely delayed by shortages of labor and material and she was not launched until 1918.

Reports from battles between the British and the Germans caused the Danes to change her secondary armament to 120-millimeter (4.7 in) guns in 1917, but work stopped completely when the war ended on 11 November 1918. Danish politicians believed that the 30.5-centimeter guns could be viewed as provocative by their neighbors and they decided to convert the ship into an innocuous training ship by adding an extra deck to the existing hull and changing the main armament to 15-centimeter (5.9 in) guns. The new design was approved in 1920 and the ship was completed in 1923.

== Description ==
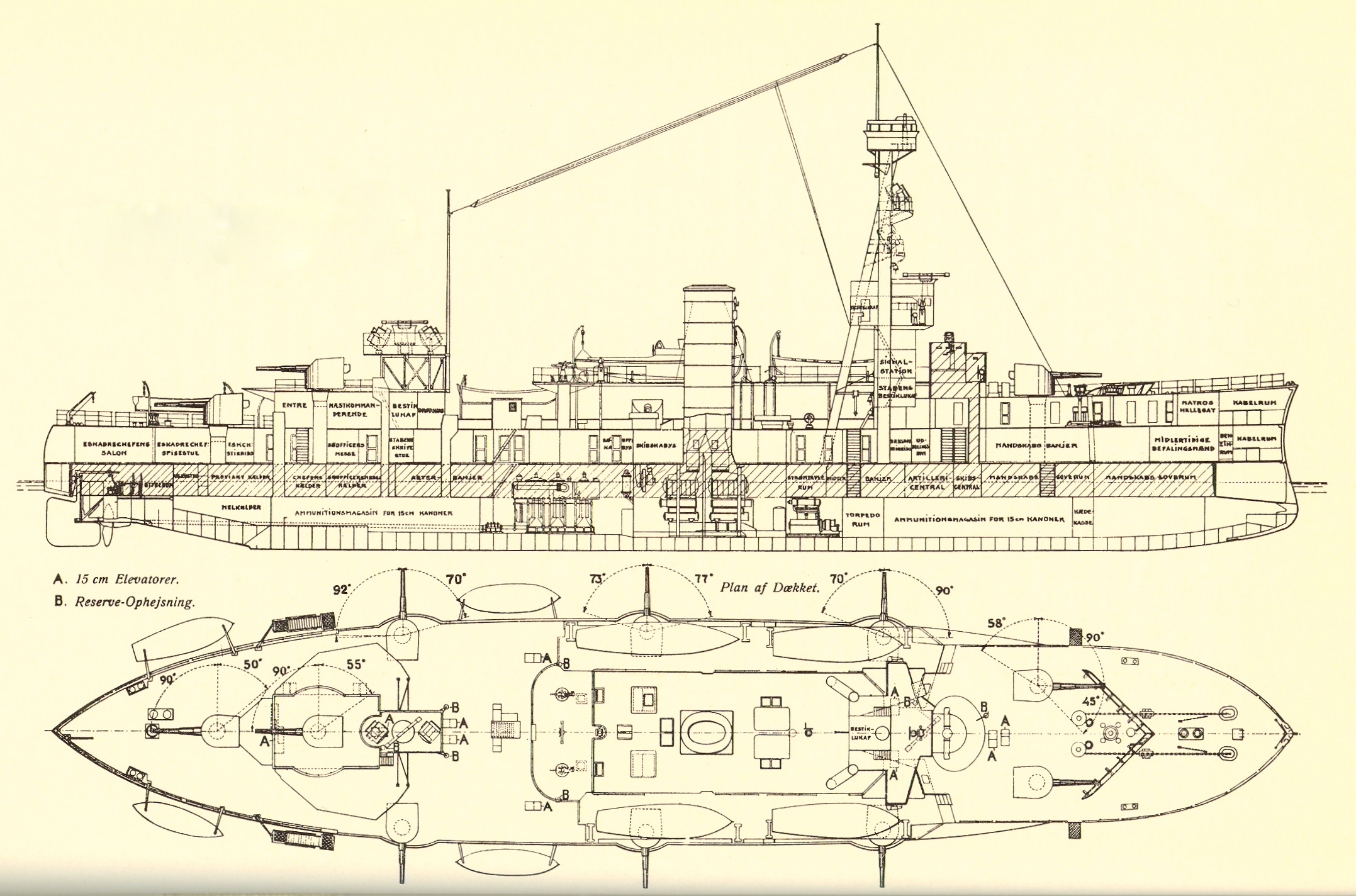
Inboard profile and deck plan of Niels Juel as completed in 1923

Niels Juel had an overall length of 90 meters (295 ft 3 in) and was 87 meters (285 ft 5 in) long at the waterline. The ship had a beam of 16.3 meters (53 ft 6 in), and a mean draft of 5 meters (16 ft 5 in). She displaced 3,800 long tons (3,900 t) at standard load and 4,100 long tons (4,200 t) at deep load. Niels Juel's crew numbered between 310 and 369 officers and sailors. Her hull was divided into 10 watertight compartments and it was fitted with a double bottom.

The ship had a pair of vertical triple-expansion steam engines, each driving a single three-bladed 3.35-meter (11 ft 0 in) propeller, using steam provided by four Yarrow boilers with superheaters that operated at a temperature of 275 °C (527 °F). The forward pair of boilers were oil fired and the after pair were coal burning. The engines were designed to produce 6,000 indicated horsepower (4,500 kW) for a speed of 14.5 knots (26.9 km/h; 16.7 mph). During her sea trials, they produced 6,061 ihp (4,520 kW) and Niels Juel reached a maximum speed of 16.1 knots (29.8 km/h; 18.5 mph). The ship carried 223 metric tons (219 long tons) of fuel oil and 244 metric tons (240 long tons) of coal which gave a range of 6,000 nautical miles (11,000 km; 6,900 mi) at 9 knots (17 km/h; 10 mph).

=== Armament and fire control ===
The Navy had difficulties procuring the 15-centimeter guns that it wanted for the ship's main battery, rejecting proposals from French, British and Swedish manufacturers as unsatisfactory. Although Krupp was not allowed to deliver finished guns by the terms of the Versailles Treaty, it worked out a deal with the Swedish Bofors company, which would finish and deliver the guns to the Danes. Niels Juel mounted ten 15-centimeter P.K. L/45 (Note: The L/45 denotes the length of the gun. In this case, the L/45 gun is 45 caliber, meaning that the gun is 45 times as long as it is in diameter.) guns, a pair side-by-side on the forecastle forward of the superstructure, three on each broadside amidships, and a superfiring pair aft of the superstructure, all protected by gun shields. The mounts had a range of elevation from -10° to +30° and the guns fired 46-kilogram (101 lb) projectiles at a muzzle velocity of 835 m/s (2,740 ft/s) at a rate of five to seven rounds per minute. The guns had a range of 17,800 meters (19,500 yd).

A pair of 57-millimeter (2.2 in) A.B.K. L/30 anti-aircraft guns were mounted on a platform abaft the funnel. The mounts had a maximum elevation of 70° and the gun had an effective rate of fire of about 16 rounds per minute. Its projectiles were fired at a muzzle velocity of 500 to 530 m/s (1,600 to 1,700 ft/s), which gave it a range of 7,500 meters (8,200 yd). The ship was fitted with a pair of submerged 450-millimeter (17.7 in) torpedo tubes, one on each broadside. The Type H torpedo had a 121.5-kilogram (268 lb) warhead and a range of 8,000 meters (8,700 yd) at 27 knots (50 km/h; 31 mph).

The ship was provided with a pair of 3-meter (9 ft 10 in) Zeiss stereoscopic rangefinders, one on the roof of the conning tower and the other on a platform abaft the mainmast. Data from the rangefinders was sent to the transmitting station located on the main deck beneath the conning tower, where it was converted into elevation and deflection data for use by the guns.

=== Protection ===
Niels Juel was protected by Krupp cemented armor (KCA) made by Bethlehem Steel. Her waterline belt was 195 millimeters (7.7 in) thick amidships and thinned to 155 millimeters (6.1 in) towards the ship's ends, but did not reach either the bow or the stern. The armor plates were 2.1 meters (6 ft 11 in) high with the lower edge 1.1 meters (3 ft 7 in) below the waterline. Two transverse bulkheads 175 millimeters (6.9 in) (forward) and 165 millimeters (6.5 in) (aft) closed off the ends of the armored citadel. The shields of the 15-centimeter guns had 50-millimeter (2.0 in) faces and 10–20-millimeter (0.4–0.8 in) sides. The 55-millimeter (2.2 in) deck plates rested on the top edge of the belt armor and were not made from KCA. The conning tower had 170-millimeter (6.7 in) of armor on the sides with a 40-millimeter (1.6 in) roof.

=== Modifications and modernization ===
In 1929 the three-meter rangefinders were transferred to the sister ships Peder Skram and Olfert Fischer and Niels Juel received a Barr & Stroud 3.66-meter (12 ft 0 in) coincidence rangefinder in return. The following year it was replaced by a Zeiss 5-meter (16 ft 5 in) coincidence rangefinder. When Niels Juel was modernized in 1935 and 1936, the first priority was to upgrade her fire-control systems. Her tripod mast was replaced by a pole mast surmounted by a two-story director-control tower that was fitted with a Dutch Hazemeyer gunnery director that fed information to the analog gunnery computer in the transmitting station below. The Navy purchased three 6-meter (19 ft 8 in) rangefinders from Zeiss to re-equip the ship, replaced the obsolete 57-millimeter AA guns with ten Madsen 20-millimeter (0.79 in) RK M/31 autocannon in five twin-gun mounts, and added tanks for a chemical smoke screen at the ship's stern. In April 1937, her anti-aircraft armament was augmented with fourteen 8-millimeter (0.3 in) Madsen R.K. L/75 M/37 machine guns in twin mounts. In early 1941 a pair of 40-millimeter Bofors light AA guns in single mounts that had been removed from a pair of submarines were added. A year later the existing 8 and 20 mm weapons were replaced by 10 faster-firing Madsen 20-millimeter L/60 M/41 autocannon in single mounts.

== Construction and career ==
Niels Juel, named after the Danish admiral of the same name, was laid down on 21 September 1914 at the Orlogsværftet (Royal Danish Naval Shipyard) in Copenhagen. The ship was launched on 3 July 1918, but she was stuck on the slipway for over an hour before she could be freed to slide into the water. Construction halted a few months later as her design was reconsidered. Construction began again in 1920 to a new design and she was commissioned in May 1923 and began a working up cruise on 28 May, with Crown Prince Frederik aboard, visiting the Faeroe Islands, Bergen, Norway, Leith, Scotland and Gothenburg, Sweden, before returning home on 6 August.

On 21 October Niels Juel made her first training cruise, visiting Dartmouth, United Kingdom, Cádiz, Spain, Madeira, Portugal, and the Cape Verde Islands, en route to South America. On her return voyage, she encountered a severe storm after leaving the Azores that broke her rudder chains and she had to be steered using only her propellers until emergency steering could be rigged. The ship returned home on 23 February 1924, after getting repairs in Plymouth, United Kingdom. Niels Juel became the flagship of the gunnery training squadron later that year and then later flagship of the general training squadron. In 1925, she made brief visits to Finland, Estonia, Latvia and Germany. The following year the ship made a cruise to the Faeroe Islands and Iceland with the royal family aboard. Niels Juel served as the royal yacht for a state visit to Finland in 1928, during which she was escorted by the cruiser Heimdal.

The ship made a training cruise to the Mediterranean in 1929, where she visited ports in France, Spain, Italy and Libya as well as Lisbon, Portugal. She resumed her position as flagship of the training squadron on her return. Beginning on 22 May 1930, Niels Juel served as a royal yacht for a royal tour of the Faeroes and Iceland as well as serving as a training ship for naval cadets. The following year, she became the first Danish warship to visit the Black Sea when she visited Istanbul, Turkey, Odessa in the Soviet Union, and ports in Greece, Italy, Algeria, and France on her way home. Niels Juel was decommissioned on 3 September 1931 after her return. The ship was modernized in 1935 and 1936 and recommissioned on 9 July and then spent the rest of 1936 working up.

Niels Juel was present at the Fleet review in Spithead for George VI of the United Kingdom on 20 May 1937 and later participated in a fleet exercise that culminated in a visit to Helsingborg, Sweden. In 1938 she accompanied the torpedo boat flotilla on a visit to Turku, Finland in August, and visited Sønderborg, Denmark, the following month with the rest of the training squadron. A planned training cruise to the United States to visit the 1939 New York World's Fair in May was cancelled as a result of rising tensions in Europe and Niels Juel trained with the mobilized Peder Skram from May to July. In late August the ship was preparing for a visit to Oslo, Norway, but that was cancelled when she was ordered to fuze all her shells in preparation for war. Her crew was filled out as the Navy mobilized and Niels Juel joined the rest of the fleet near Aarhus. Winter ice forced the ship to return to Copenhagen in January 1940, even though that port was ice-bound as well. With little possibility of action, her crew was given leave. Her crew was recalled on 8 April, but Niels Juel was not ready for war when the Germans invaded the following day. The Germans permitted the Danes to keep their ships and allowed them to train in Danish waters.

=== Operation Safari ===
Following increasing Danish resistance to German rule and the institution of martial law on 28 August 1943, the German army moved to seize the Danish fleet in Copenhagen harbour the following morning, an action codenamed Operation Safari. Niels Juel was in Holbæk when her captain, Commander Carl Westermann, was ordered take his ship to be interned in Sweden. The Germans spotted her after she raised steam and departed. Before the ship could exit the Isefjord, Westermann was informed that the Germans had claimed they had mined the exit, and he spotted three German ships in the distance, the torpedo boat T17 and two E-boats. German aircraft attacked the ship with bombs and by strafing. None of the bombs hit Niels Juel, but shock damage from near misses knocked out electrical power and deformed some of the hull plating and bulkheads. Realising there was little hope of reaching Sweden, Westermann decided to run the ship aground near Nykøbing Sjælland. The crew then tried to scuttle the ship, but an initial attempt to blow up the ship failed. The crew settled for flooding the magazine, opening the sea-cocks to flood the rest of the hull as well as systematically destroying the equipment before the Germans could take over the ship.

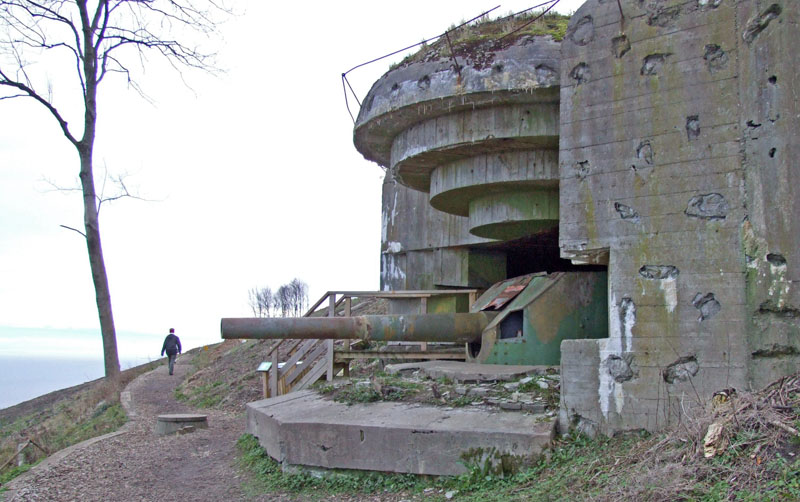
A 15 cm cannon salvaged in 1944 from Niels Juel and installed at the German-built Bangsbo Fort in Frederikshavn, Denmark

=== 1944 to 1952 ===
A Danish salvage company inspected the grounded ship a few days later and did not see any damage to the hull, rudder or propellers, but noted that the ship was flooded with water up to a height of 1.5 meters (4 ft 11 in) below the armored deck. The Germans used a German company to salvage the ship in October and towed it to Kiel, Germany, for repair. She was disarmed, renamed Nordland, and commissioned into the Kriegsmarine in September 1944 after which she became a stationary training ship at Stolpmünde (modern Ustka, Poland). On 18 February 1945 the ship steamed to Kiel to avoid the advancing Russian forces. On 3 May, she was scuttled for the second time in the Eckernførde inlet. The wreck was partially dismantled by unauthorized salvagers before the Danes sold it to a German firm in 1952 for scrap. They removed everything above the sea bed, but its remains lie under 28 meters (92 ft) of water.

== Bibliography ==
- Campbell, John (1985). Naval Weapons of World War II. Annapolis, Maryland: Naval Institute Press. ISBN 0-87021-459-4.
- Westerlund, Karl-Erik (1985). "Denmark". In Gardiner, Robert & Gray, Randal (eds.). Conway's All the World's Fighting Ships 1906–1921. Annapolis, Maryland: Naval Institute Press. pp. 351–354. ISBN 0-85177-245-5.
- Wisman, Tom (2018). "Niels Juel: 'A Funny Little Danish Warship'". In Jordan, John (ed.). Warship 2018. Oxford, UK: Osprey. pp. 8–27. ISBN 978-1-4728-2999-3.
