= HDMY Dannebrog =

Two Danish royal yachts have borne the name Dannebrog:

- HDMY Dannebrog (1879) was a royal yacht launched in 1879, in Copenhagen.
- HDMY Dannebrog (A540) is a 1,238-ton royal yacht launched in 1931, by the Naval Dockyard in Copenhagen.
