= HDMS Olfert Fischer =

At least two ships of the Royal Danish Navy have been named Olfert Fischer:

- HDMS Olfert Fischer (1903), a coastal defense ship built in the early 1900s
- HDMS Olfert Fischer (F355), a corvette built in the late 1970s and early 1980s
