= HDMS Olfert Fischer (1903) =

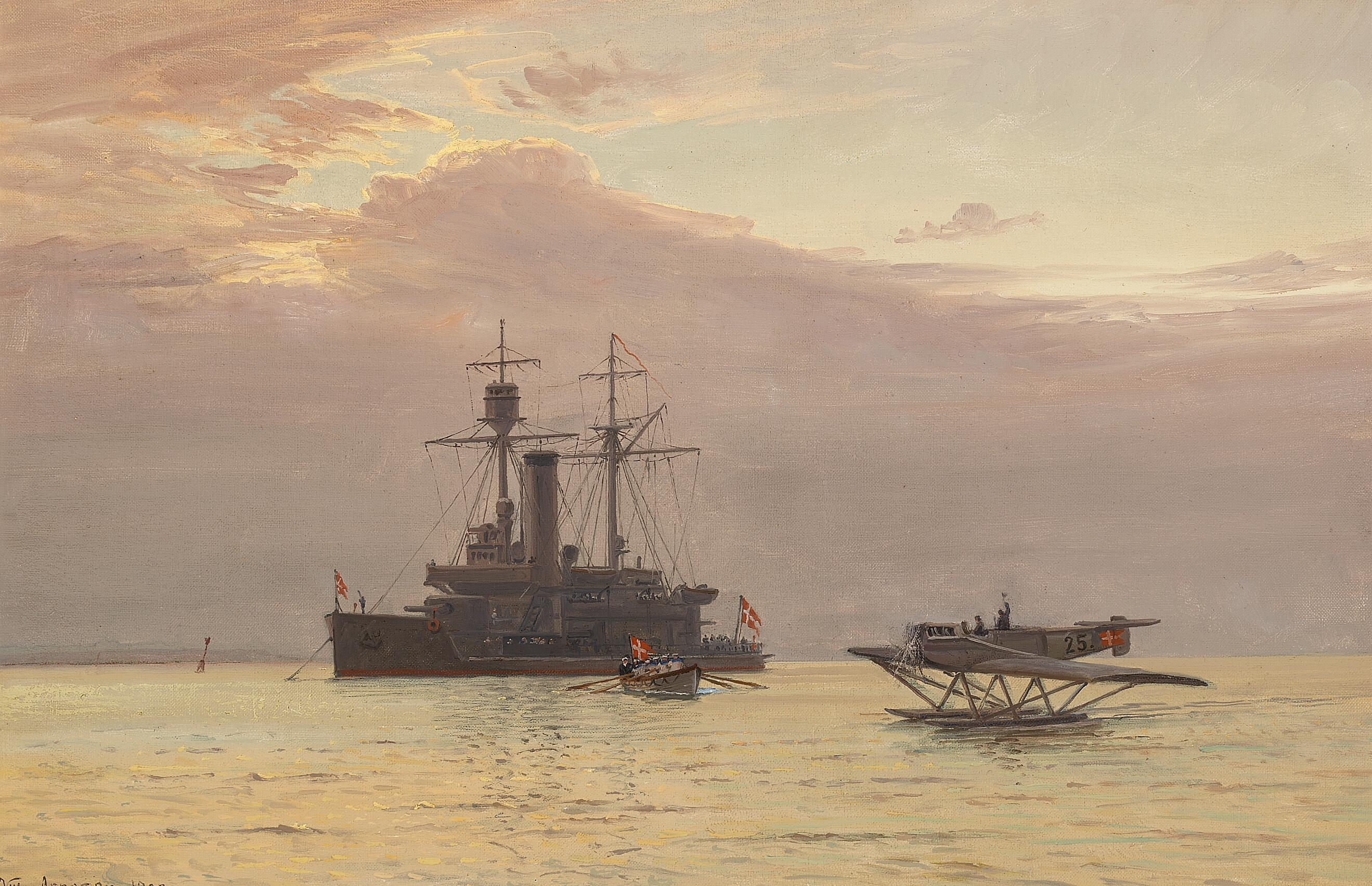
- Painting of Olfert Fischer with a seaplane nearby in 1922

History

Denmark
- Name: Olfert Fischer
- Builder: Orlogsværftet
- Laid down: 20 October 1900
- Launched: 9 May 1903
- Commissioned: 31 May 1905
- Fate: Sold for scrap, October 1936

General characteristics
- Displacement: 3,592 long tons (3,650 t)
- Length: 82.88 m (271 ft 11 in) pp
- Beam: 15.39 m (50 ft 6 in)
- Draft: 5.00 m (16 ft 5 in)
- Installed power: 6 × water-tube boilers; 4,200 ihp (3,100 kW)
- Propulsion: 2 × triple-expansion engines; 2 × screw propellers
- Speed: 15.5 knots (28.7 km/h; 17.8 mph)
- Complement: 254
- Armament: 2 × 240 mm (9.4 in) guns; 4 × 150 mm (5.9 in) guns; 10 × 6-pounder guns; 6 × 3-pounder guns; 2 × 1-pounder Hotchkiss revolver cannon; 2 × 1-pounder automatic guns; 3 × 457 mm (18 in) torpedo tubes
- Armor: Belt armor: 178 to 203 mm (7 to 8 in); Gun turrets: 170 to 190 mm (6.5 to 7.5 in)

HDMS Olfert Fischer was the second member of the Herluf Trolle class of coastal defense ships built for the Royal Danish Navy. The Herluf Trolle class was built in response to a naval construction program in neighboring Imperial Germany. The Danish ships were built in the late 1890s and early 1900s. They were armed with a main battery of two 240 mm (9.4 in) guns and were capable of a top speed of 15.5 knots (28.7 km/h; 17.8 mph). Because she was intended to operate as part of a solely defensive naval strategy, Olfert Fischer had a fairly uneventful career. She visited Britain in 1911 to represent Denmark at the coronation of George V and Mary. During World War I, Denmark remained neutral and Olfert Fischer was assigned to the defense forces that guarded Danish territorial waters. Sharply reduced naval budgets in the 1920s and 1930s curtailed further activities, and Olfert Fischer saw little activity during this period, apart from testing a reconnaissance aircraft in 1922. She was eventually converted into a target ship and used for tests of aerial bombing of a ship underway in October 1936, before being sold for scrap immediately thereafter.

== Design ==
By the end of the 19th century, which had seen Denmark's decline from a major navy before the devastating Battle of Copenhagen in 1801 to a minor coastal defense force by the 1890s, the Royal Danish Navy was primarily concerned with countering the naval strength of its neighbor, Imperial Germany. In the early 1890s, the Germans had completed eight coastal defense ships of the Siegfried and Odin classes, prompting the Danish government to consider strengthening their fleet in 1894 in response. As work on the design began, the designers reviewed the lessons of the First Sino-Japanese War, which was fought over the course of 1894 and into 1895. Funds for the first ship, Herluf Trolle, were authorized in 1896, but the second vessel, Olfert Fischer was delayed until 1900 by the weak Danish finances.

At the time, Denmark's naval strategy was entirely defensive; the coastal defense ships like Olfert Fischer were intended to guard the island of Zealand (where the capital at Copenhagen lay) in combination with coastal artillery batteries, and defensive minefields, and to support flotillas of torpedo boats in the confined waters of the Danish Straits.

=== Characteristics ===
Plan and profile of the Herluf Trolle class

Olfert Fischer was 82.88 m (271 ft 11 in) long between perpendiculars, with a beam of 15.39 m (50 ft 6 in) and an average draft of 5.00 m (16 ft 5 in). She displaced 3,592 long tons (3,650 t) as designed. As the ships were intended to operate in Denmark's shallow coastal waters, they had a low freeboard. They had a shore forecastle forward to improve seakeeping. Olfert Fischer had a fairly large superstructure that included an armored conning tower; Olfert Fischer's conning tower was enlarged compared to her sister ships, so that she could serve as a flagship. Her crew amounted to 254 officers and enlisted men.

The ship was powered by a pair of triple-expansion steam engines that drove a pair of screw propellers. Steam for the engines was provided by six coal-burning water-tube boilers, which were vented through a single funnel placed amidships. The ship's propulsion system was rated to produce 4,200 indicated horsepower (3,100 kW) for a top speed of 15.5 knots (28.7 km/h; 17.8 mph).

The ship's armament was centered on a main battery of two 240 mm (9.4 in) 43-caliber guns mounted individually in gun turrets, one forward and the other aft. These were supported by a secondary battery of four 150 mm (5.9 in) 43-caliber guns, which were placed in casemates in the side of the hull. Close-range defense against torpedo boats was provided by a light battery of ten 6-pounder guns, six 3-pounder guns, two 1-pounder Hotchkiss revolver cannon, and two 1-pounder automatic guns. She also carried three 457 mm (18 in) torpedo tubes.

Armor protection consisted of Krupp cemented steel. The ship's armor belt was 178 to 203 mm (7 to 8 in) thick, and it connected to her armor deck that was 51 mm (2 in). Above the deck, the sides of the superstructure, where the 150 mm guns were housed, received 180 mm (7 in) of armor plate. Her main battery turrets received 170 to 190 mm (6.5 to 7.5 in) of armor plate on their faces and sides.

== Service history ==
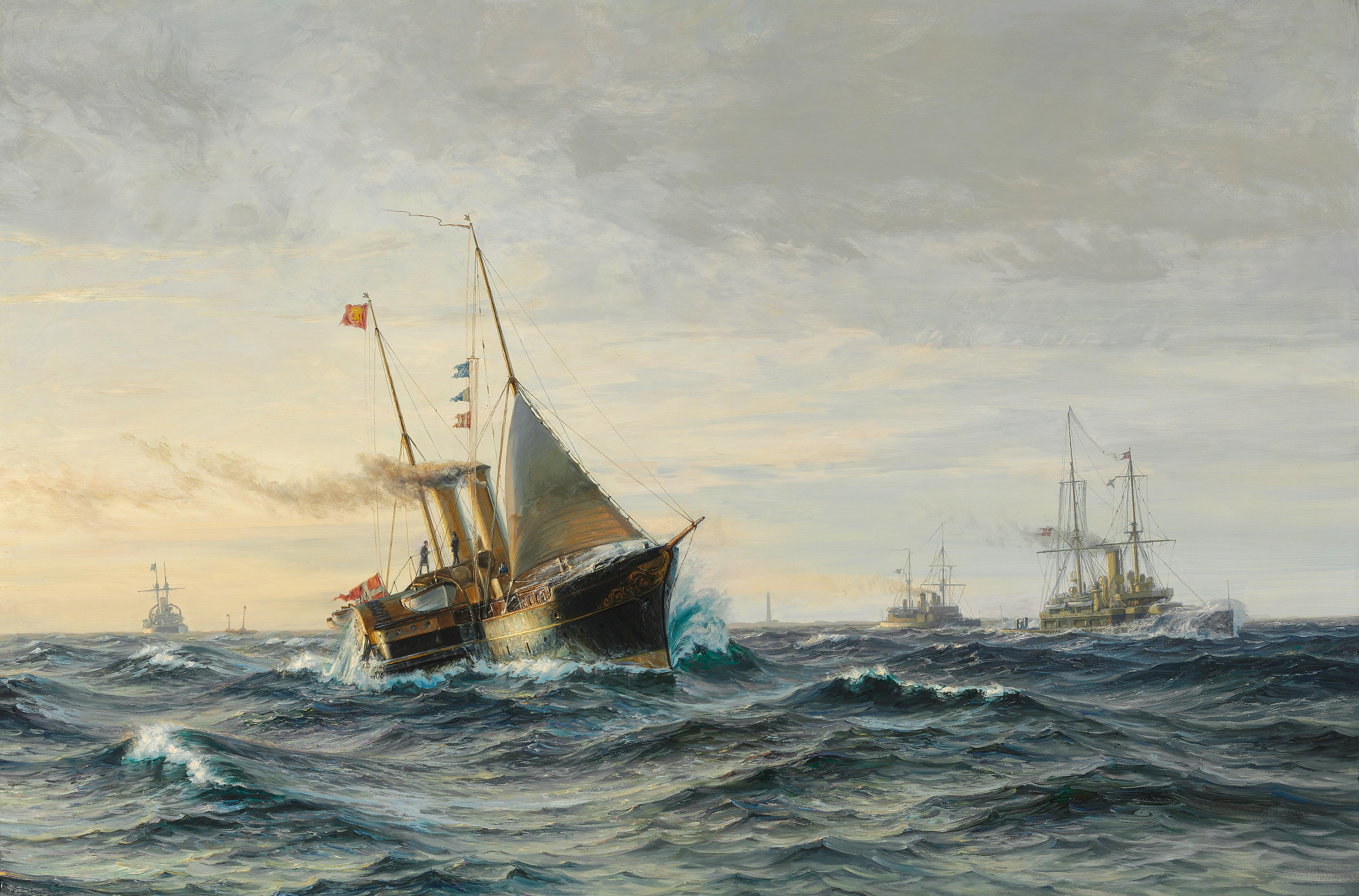
Dannebrog (center left) on the way to Norway in 1905; Olfert Fischer (right) is part of the escort

Olfert Fischer was built at the Orlogsværftet shipyard in Copenhagen. Her keel was laid down on 20 October 1900, and she was launched on 9 May 1903. Work on the ship was completed in 1905, and she was commissioned into active service on 31 May. She carried out sea trials through June and the first half of July. Olfert Fischer was ready for regular service by 20 July, when she joined the summer training squadron commanded by Rear Admiral Prince Valdemar. By late September, Valdemar had transferred his flag to Olfert Fischer. At the end of November, Olfert Fischer and the cruiser Gejser were sent to escort the royal yacht Dannebrog, which was carrying Prince Carl of Denmark to Trondheim, Norway. There, he was crowned King Haakon VII of Norway. The Danish ships then returned home, and on 2 December, Olfert Fischer was placed in reserve for the winter. She was reactivated in 1906 to join the summer training squadron. That year, she visited Kiel, Germany.

Olfert Fischer remained in reserve in 1907, but was reactivated for the 1908 training squadron. She also participated in the 1909 training program, which also included a winter training squadron that operated into 1910. By 1910, all three of the Herluf Trolle-class ships had been completed, and they operated in the summer training squadron together for the first time that year. Olfert Fischer, her two sister ships, and the cruiser Heimdal visited Bergen and Odda, Norway in 1910. Olfert Fischer saw service in 1911 as a training ship assigned to the artillery and torpedo school. That year, she joined Herluf Trolle for a visit to the Netherlands, passing through the Kiel Canal in Germany on the way. While there in June, Olfert Fischer sailed to Britain to represent Denmark at the fleet review for the coronation of King George V on 24 June. On the way home, Olfert Fischer visited Harwich, Great Britain. She rejoined the rest of the active squadron in the Skagen on 1 July.

In early 1912, Olfert Fischer was reactivated for the annual training cycle, which began with an independent cruise, followed by small-scale maneuvers on 15 May. Shortly thereafter, King Frederik VIII of Denmark died while visiting Hamburg, Germany; Olfert Fischer and her sister ship Peder Skram were sent to escort Dannebrog as she carried his remains back from Travemünde, Germany, to Denmark. Vice Admiral Otto Kofoed-Hansen hoisted his flag aboard Olfert Fischer for the voyage. The Danish squadron encountered a group of three German cruisers on the way, which fired salutes in recognition of the Danish king's death; the German vessels then joined the Danish ships for the remainder of the trip. The ships arrived in Copenhagen on 17 May. Olfert Fischer later operated with the training squadron during exercises in the North Sea. On 2 July, she left Esbjerg, Denmark, for a visit to Antwerp, the Netherlands, before returning to Copenhagen on 9 July. There, she was laid up briefly before being recommissioned in September for the 1912–1913 winter training squadron, which also included the coastal defense ship Skjold. In mid-1913, Olfert Fischer joined her two sisters in the summer training squadron. In June, Olfert Fischer visited Terneuzen and Ghent in the Netherlands. Routine peacetime training activities continued through mid-1914, by which time tensions had risen significantly in the lead-up to World War I.

=== World War I ===
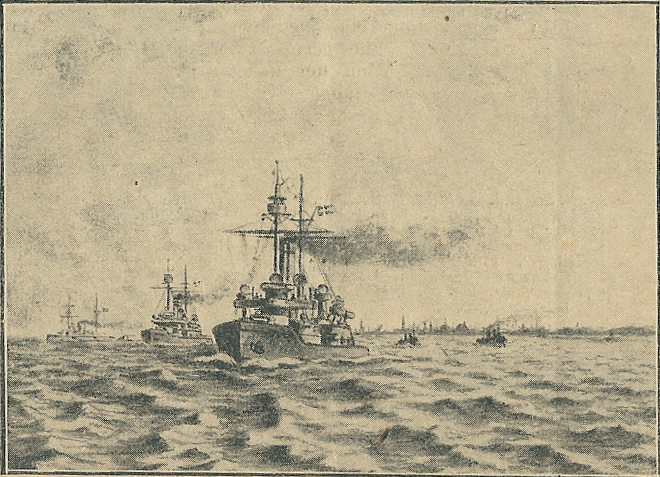
Sketch of the Danish fleet in 1914

After war broke out in late July 1914, Denmark established the Sikringsstyrken (security force) on 31 July to enforce its neutrality during the conflict. Olfert Fischer was initially mobilized with orders to be ready to sail at a 24-hour notice. The Danish fleet, which at that time consisted of Olfert Fischer and her two sisters, fifteen torpedo boats, seven submarines, and six mine-warfare vessels, employed a strategy of laying minefields in its territorial waters to prevent belligerent ships from entering. The surface warships, including Olfert Fischer, patrolled the narrow and shallow waterways, where they would be difficult to attack in the event that Denmark was brought into the conflict. They were divided into two units: 1st Squadron, which was to defend Copenhagen, and 2nd Squadron, which patrolled the Great Belt. On 2 August 1914, Olfert Fischer got underway as the flagship of 2nd Squadron.

By February 1915, she had moved to 1st Squadron, stationed in the Øresund. Over the course of the war, Olfert Fischer and her sisters alternated between the two units as needed, such as when vessels needed to withdraw for maintenance. The rest of the war passed uneventfully for Olfert Fischer. In November 1918, following the end of the war, Olfert Fischer was sent to Copenhagen to guard several Russian steam ships that had been impounded in the port. On 7 December, Olfert Fischer was decommissioned.

=== Post-war career ===
In the aftermath of World War I, the Danish naval budget was significantly reduced, which kept much of the fleet laid up due to a lack of funds. Olfert Fischer saw a brief period of service in February 1920 to guard Danish waters in the Little Belt. During this period, Germans and escaped Russian prisoners of war entered Denmark and began committing a number of crimes, including illegal logging. Olfert Fischer supported a group of torpedo boats, submarines, and other smaller vessels used to patrol for these roving gangs. A general strike broke out in Denmark in response to the Easter Crisis in April, leading to a breakdown of shipping between the various Danish islands. The government pressed its ships into service to reduce the disruption, and Olfert Fischer made a voyage to Rønne on the island of Bornholm. On 5 May, after the 1920 Schleswig plebiscites that saw the southern border of Denmark adjusted, Olfert Fischer carried soldiers from Assens to Southern Jutland to Sønderborg in replace the Allied troops that were occupying the area after the war. Olfert Fischer thereafter operated with the training division, and in mid-July, she formed part of the escort for King Christian X during his visit to Southern Jutland after the reunification.

The ship was commissioned in 1922 to serve as the flagship of the summer training squadron. During this period, she embarked on a cruise to visit Stockholm, Sweden in July and Danzig, Germany. Peder Skram joined her for the trip, and the two ships carried an Orlogsværftet HM-1 aircraft for evaluation. The aircraft were handled with a boom, which could be used to lower the plane from the ship to the water and then retrieve it upon landing. The experiment proved to be unsatisfactory, and the coastal defense ships did not carry aircraft afterward. Olfert Fischer was reactivated in 1923 for that year's summer training cycle, during which she served as the unit flagship. She also embarked on solo cruises in the local area. Naval budgets continued to be cut through the 1920s and into the early 1930s, preventing most ships from going to sea. Olfert Fischer went to sea in 1926, 1928, and 1933 as a training ship with the artillery school; she also participated in the annual fleet maneuvers with the summer training squadron those years.

By 1936, the navy had decided to scrap Olfert Fischer. But before she was sold, she was converted into a target ship; as much of the ship's components as possible were removed, including useful equipment like her radios. range-finders, fire control equipment, searchlights, and the light guns. She had extra armor installed to protect a skeleton crew, who would steam the ship at a speed of 9 knots (17 km/h; 10 mph). She took part in bombing tests off Faxe that lasted from 5 to 17 October October 1936; over the course of twelve days, army and navy bombers dropped a total of 386 small, practice bombs to determine the hit probability of aerial attacks on ships underway and able to take evasive maneuvers. Only twelve of the 12 kg (26 lb) bombs hit Olfert Fischer. Sections of the ship were sold to three different ship breakers later that month, and the demolition work was carried out over the course of 1937 and 1938. Her main guns were added to the coastal defenses of Holmen Naval Base, where they remained until 1948, when they too were scrapped.
