= Tumleren-class torpedo boat =

Class of Danish torpedo boats

Class overview
- Name: Tumleren-class torpedo boat
- Builders: Schichau-Werke, Elbing; Orlogsværftet, Copenhagen
- Operators: Royal Danish Navy
- Built: 1910–1912
- In commission: 1911–1930
- Completed: 3
- Retired: 3

General characteristics
- Type: Torpedo boat
- Displacement: 282 long tons (287 t) loaded
- Length: 56.0 m (183 ft 9 in) o/a
- Beam: 6.0 m (19 ft 8 in)
- Draught: 2.3 m (7 ft 7 in)
- Installed power: 2,500 shp (1,900 kW)
- Propulsion: Steam turbine; 2 shafts
- Speed: 25 knots (46 km/h; 29 mph)
- Armament: 2 × 75 mm L/30 guns; 1 × machine gun; 5 × 450 mm torpedo tubes

The Tumleren class was a class of three torpedo boats built for the Royal Danish Navy. The lead ship of the class, Tumleren was designed and built by the German shipyard Schichau-Werke in 1911, with two more ships, Vindhunden and Spækhuggeren, built under license by the Copenhagen naval dockyard. The last of the three torpedo boats was retired from active service in 1930, and the three ships were sold for scrap in 1935.

== Construction and design ==
In 1908, the Royal Danish Navy decided to acquire several torpedo boats, with two of the world's leading torpedo boat specialists, the German shipyard Schichau-Werke and the British shipyard Yarrows, each contracted to design and build a prototype torpedo boat, with two more torpedo boats of each design to be built under license in Danish shipyards.

Schichau's design, the Tumleren class, were 56.0 metres (183 ft 9 in) long overall and 54.0 metres (177 ft 2 in) length between perpendiculars, with a beam of 6.0 metres (19 ft 8 in) and a draught of 2.3 metres (7 ft 7 in) fully loaded. Displacement was 282 long tons (287 t) full load. Two coal-fed boilers supplied steam for two Schichau direct-drive steam turbines, which drove two propeller shafts. The machinery was rated at 5,000 shaft horsepower (3,700 kW), giving a design speed of 27.5 knots (50.9 km/h; 31.6 mph). 50 tonnes (49 long tons; 55 short tons) of coal was carried, giving a cruising radius of 750 nautical miles (1,390 km; 860 mi) at 14 knots (26 km/h; 16 mph).

The ships carried five 450 mm (17.7 in) torpedo tubes, with one in the bow and the remaining four in single swivelling mounts fore and aft on the ships' beam. Two 75 mm L/30 guns were carried fore and aft on the ships' centreline, with a single 8 mm (0.3 in) machine gun completing the armament. Crew was 35 officers and other ranks.

The first of the ships, the Schichau-built Tumleren was launched at Schichau's Elbing, Prussia (now Elbląg, Poland) shipyard on 1 March 1911 and commissioned on 28 August that year, while the remaining two ships, Vindhunden and Spækhuggeren, were built at the Orlogsværftet, the Copenhagen Naval Dockyard, launching later that year and completing in 1912.

== Service ==
The three Tumleren-class ships were considered more advanced than the Yarrow designed Söridderen-class torpedo boats, although the Söridderen class, which had higher freeboard, were more seaworthy. They served through the First World War on neutrality patrols. Tumleren and Spækhuggeren were retired to the reserves in 1929, with Vindhunden following in 1930. All three ships were sold for scrap in 1935.

== Ships ==
Name	Laid down	Launched
HDMS Tumleren	—N/a	1 March 1911
HDMS Vindhunden	21 October 1910	16 December 1911
HDMS Spækhuggeren	29 October 1910	7 October 1911
