= HDMS Herluf Trolle (1899) =

Danish warship

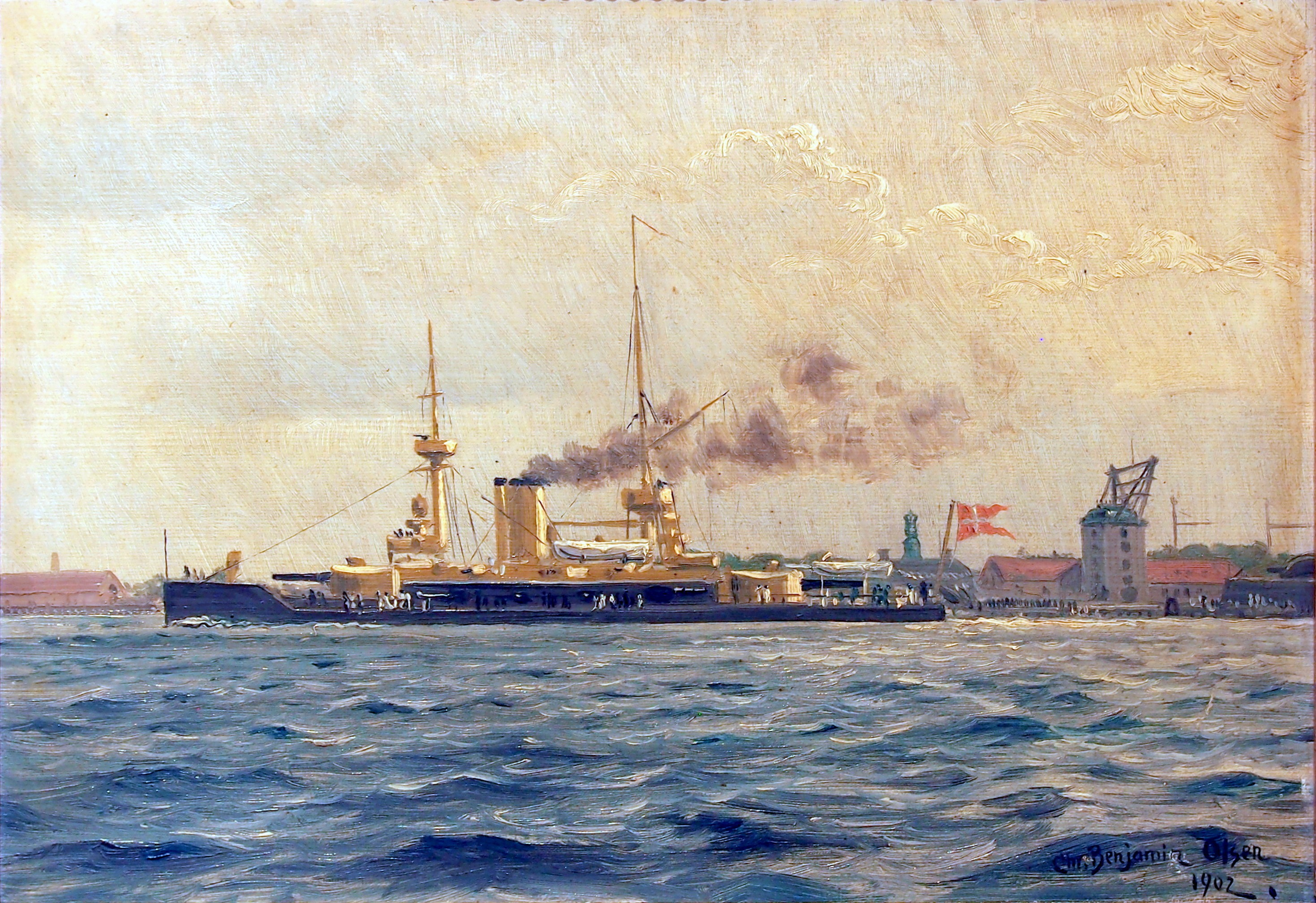
- Painting of Herluf Trolle c. 1902

History

Denmark
- Name: Herluf Trolle
- Builder: Orlogsværftet
- Laid down: 20 July 1897
- Launched: 2 September 1899
- Commissioned: 7 June 1901
- Stricken: 30 April 1932
- Fate: Sold for scrap, 1934

General characteristics
- Displacement: 3,494 long tons (3,550 t)
- Length: 82.88 m (271 ft 11 in) pp
- Beam: 15.06 m (49 ft 5 in)
- Draft: 4.93 m (16 ft 2 in)
- Installed power: 6 × water-tube boilers; 4,200 ihp (3,100 kW)
- Propulsion: 2 × triple-expansion engines; 2 × screw propellers
- Speed: 15.5 knots (28.7 km/h; 17.8 mph)
- Complement: 254
- Armament: 2 × 240 mm (9.4 in) guns; 4 × 150 mm (5.9 in) guns; 10 × 6-pounder guns; 3 × 1-pounder Hotchkiss revolver cannon; 8 × 1-pounder automatic guns; 3 × 457 mm (18 in) torpedo tubes
- Armor: Belt armor: 178 to 203 mm (7 to 8 in); Gun turrets: 170 to 190 mm (6.5 to 7.5 in)

HDMS Herluf Trolle was the lead ship of the Herluf Trolle class of coastal defense ships built for the Royal Danish Navy. The Herluf Trolle class was built in response to a naval construction program in neighboring Imperial Germany. The Danish ships were built in the late 1890s and early 1900s. They were armed with a main battery of two 240 mm (9.4 in) guns and were capable of a top speed of 15.5 knots (28.7 km/h; 17.8 mph). Because she was intended to operate as part of a solely defensive naval strategy, Herluf Trolle had a fairly uneventful career. She visited Britain in 1902 to represent Denmark at the coronation of Edward VII and Alexandra. During World War I, Denmark remained neutral and Herluf Trolle was assigned to the defense forces that guarded Danish territorial waters. Sharply reduced naval budgets in the 1920s and 1930s curtailed further activities, and in 1932, she was discarded for scrap.

== Design ==
By the end of the 19th century, which had seen Denmark's decline from a major navy before the devastating Battle of Copenhagen in 1801 to a minor coastal defense force by the 1890s, the Royal Danish Navy was primarily concerned with countering the naval strength of its neighbor, Imperial Germany. In the early 1890s, the Germans had completed eight coastal defense ships of the Siegfried and Odin classes, prompting the Danish government to consider strengthening their fleet in 1894 in response. As work on the design began, the designers reviewed the lessons of the First Sino-Japanese War, which was fought over the course of 1894 and into 1895. Funds for the first ship, Herluf Trolle, were authorized in 1896. At that time, Denmark's naval strategy was entirely defensive; the coastal defense ships like Herluf Trolle were intended to guard the island of Zealand (where the capital at Copenhagen lay) in combination with coastal artillery batteries, and defensive minefields, and to support flotillas of torpedo boats in the confined waters of the Danish Straits.

=== Characteristics ===
Plan and profile of the Herluf Trolle class

Herluf Trolle was 82.88 m (271 ft 11 in) long between perpendiculars, with a beam of 15.06 m (49 ft 5 in) and an average draft of 4.93 m (16 ft 2 in). She displaced 3,494 long tons (3,550 t) as designed. As the ships were intended to operate in Denmark's shallow coastal waters, they had a low freeboard. They had a shore forecastle forward to improve seakeeping. Herluf Trolle had a fairly large superstructure that included an armored conning tower. Her crew amounted to 254 officers and enlisted men.

The ship was powered by a pair of triple-expansion steam engines that drove a pair of screw propellers. Steam for the engines was provided by six coal-burning water-tube boilers, which were vented through a single funnel placed amidships. The ship's propulsion system was rated to produce 4,200 indicated horsepower (3,100 kW) for a top speed of 15.5 knots (28.7 km/h; 17.8 mph).

The ship's armament was centered on a main battery of two 240 mm (9.4 in) 40-caliber guns mounted individually in gun turrets, one forward and the other aft. These were supported by a secondary battery of four 150 mm (5.9 in) 43-caliber guns, which were placed in casemates in the side of the hull. Close-range defense against torpedo boats was provided by a light battery of ten 6-pounder guns, three 1-pounder Hotchkiss revolver cannon, and eight 1-pounder automatic guns. She also carried three 457 mm (18 in) torpedo tubes.

Armor protection consisted of Krupp cemented steel. The ship's armor belt was 178 to 203 mm (7 to 8 in) thick, and it connected to her armor deck that was 51 mm (2 in). Above the deck, the sides of the superstructure, where the 150 mm guns were housed, received 180 mm (7 in) of armor plate. Her main battery turrets received 170 to 190 mm (6.5 to 7.5 in) of armor plate on their faces and sides.

== Service history ==
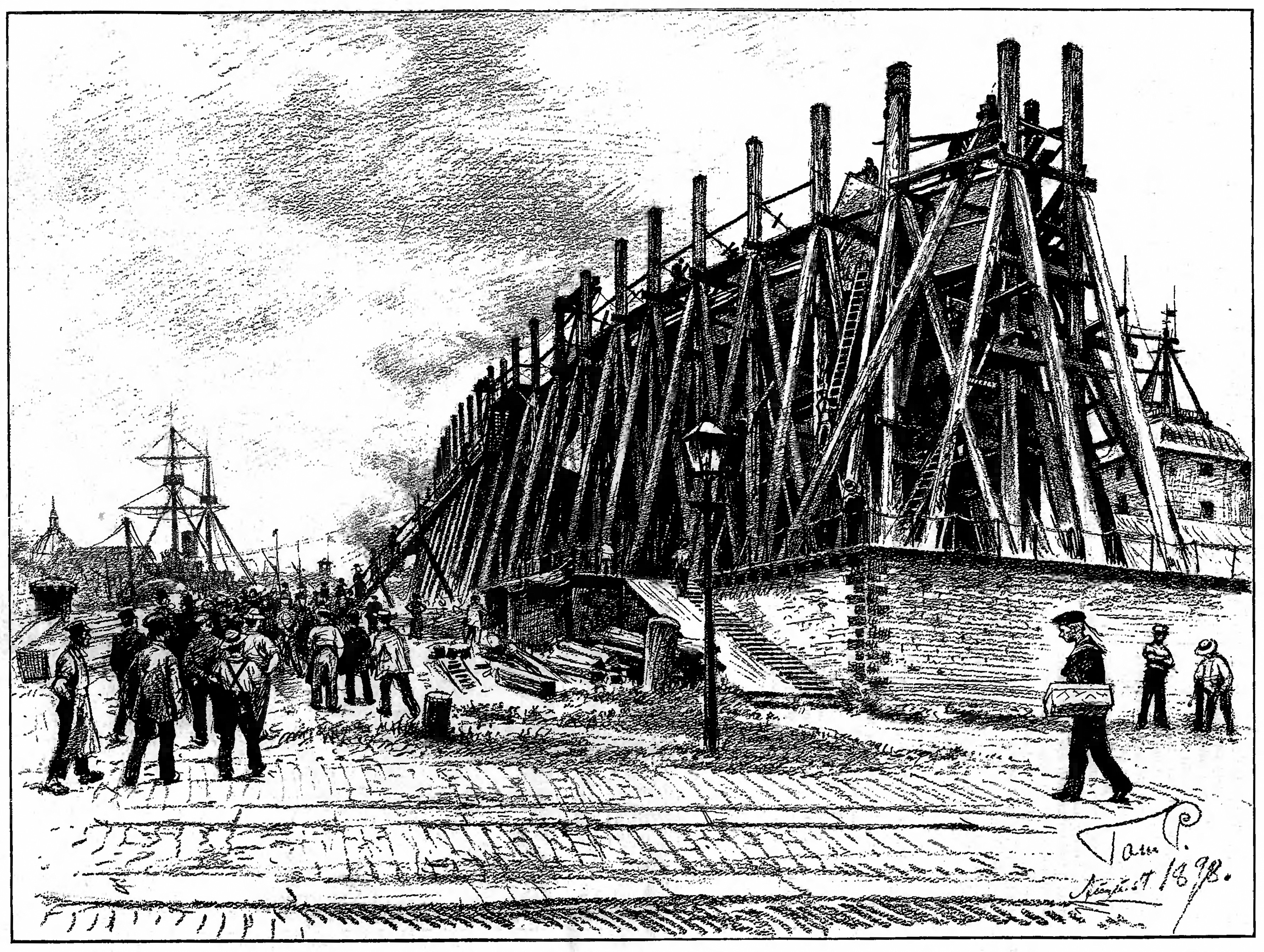
Sketch of Herluf Trolle under construction, c. 1898

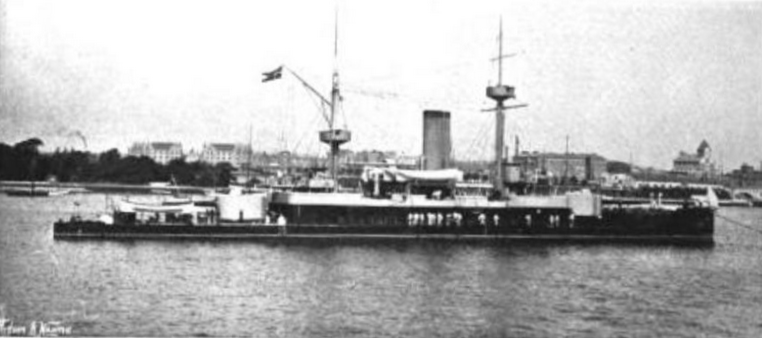
Herluf Trolle c. 1902

Funds for the first ship of the class were approved on 18 August 1896. Work on Herluf Trolle began at the Orlogsværftet shipyard in Copenhagen, with her keel laying on 20 July 1897. The ship's launching was originally scheduled for August 1899, but delivery of her British-made armor plate was delayed significantly. Rather than allow the incomplete ship to occupy the slipway longer than she was scheduled, Herluf Trolle was launched without her belt armor on 2 September 1899, and the launching ceremony was attended by King Christian IX and his daughter Alexandra, who was by then the Princess of Wales. The ship's armor plate was installed using a floating steam crane over the winter of 1899/1900. Fitting out work continued into 1901, and she was commissioned for active service on 7 June 1901. She thereafter conducted a six-week cruise for her initial sea trials, and during this period she visited Arendal, Norway.

In 1902, Herluf Trolle was assigned to the active training squadron for that year. In August, Herluf Trolle visited Britain to represent Denmark at the fleet review for the coronation of Edward VII and Alexandra. After returning home, Herluf Trolle resumed activities with the training squadron and later visited Karlskrona, Sweden. The ship remained laid up in 1903, but was reactivated to take part in the 1904 training squadron. She saw no active service in 1905, but returned to duty for the 1906 training year. Later that year, Herluf Trolle escorted the royal yacht Dannebrog, which was carrying Prince Carl of Denmark to Trondheim, Norway. There, he was crowned King Haakon VII of Norway. During the voyage, the ships visited Hardanger, Ålesund, and Molde, Norway. Later in 1906, while operating with the training squadron, Herluf Trolle visited Kiel, Germany. The ship was placed in reserve again in 1907, but was reactivated for the 1908 training squadron.

By 1910, all three of the Herluf Trolle-class ships had been completed, and they operated in the summer training squadron together for the first time that year. The ships all visited Bergen and Odda, Norway, that year. They remained active over the winter of 1911–1911, and later that year they visited Amsterdam, the Netherlands. The three ships carried out routine peacetime training activities over the next three years. During this period, in June 1914, Herluf Trolle visited Newcastle, Great Britain. By that time tensions had risen significantly in the lead-up to World War I, and the annual summer maneuvers were cancelled after the war started at the end of July.

=== World War I and fate ===
After war broke out in August 1914, Denmark established the Sikringsstyrken (security force) to enforce its neutrality during the conflict. The Danish fleet, which at that time consisted of Herluf Trolle and her two sisters, fifteen torpedo boats, seven submarines, and six mine-warfare vessels, employed a strategy of laying minefields in its territorial waters to prevent belligerent ships from entering. The surface warships, including Herluf Trolle, patrolled the narrow and shallow waterways, where they would be difficult to attack in the event that Denmark was brought into the conflict. They were divided into two units: 1st Squadron, which was to defend Copenhagen, and 2nd Squadron, which patrolled the Great Belt. Herluf Trolle and her sisters alternated between the two units as needed, such as when vessels needed to withdraw for maintenance. At the end of the war in November 1918, Herluf Trolle was with the 2nd Squadron in the Great Belt. The unit was disbanded the following month, and Herluf Trolle became the flagship of the winter training squadron that operated through March 1919.

In the aftermath of World War I, the Danish naval budget was significantly reduced, which kept much of the fleet laid up due to a lack of funds. Herluf Trolle was reactivated in 1922 to serve with the active squadron. Naval budgets continued to be cut through the 1920s and into the early 1930s, preventing most ships from going to sea. Herluf Trolle next saw service in 1929 as the squadron flagship, which lasted into 1930. She went to sea for the last time in 1930, by then serving as a gunnery training ship. With no funds to maintain her, the Danish navy struck Herluf Trolle from the naval register on 30 April 1932 and sold her to be broken up for scrap in 1934. The ship's 240 mm and 150 mm guns were retained for use as coastal artillery, the former sent to strengthen the defenses of Holmen Naval Base and the latter being installed at Kongelund. During World War II, after Germany invaded Denmark in 1940, the Germans moved the 150 mm guns to Gniben. After the war, all of the remaining guns were scrapped in 1947–1948.
