= Orlogsværftet H-Maskinen =

Type of aircraft

The Orlogsværftet H-Maskinen was a Danish military reconnaissance biplane built at the Orlogsværftet Flying Machine Workshop in 1917 and in service until 1924. It was built out of wood and silver-doped canvas, held together by metal brackets. Turn-buckles and piano wire were used to true it up. A total of nine aircraft were built.

== Specifications ==
- Cruising speed: 120 km/h (75 mph)
- Max speed: 139 km/h (86 mph)
- Span: 11.6 m (38 ft)
- Empty weight: 786 kg (1,733 lb)
- Full weight: 1,111 kg (2,449 lb)
- Engine: 140 HP Argus
- Crew: 2
- Armament: One 8 mm (0.31 in) Madsen machine gun in a movable rear mount
- Cockpit: Open
