= Herluf Trolle-class coastal defence ship =

Warship class of the Royal Danish Navy

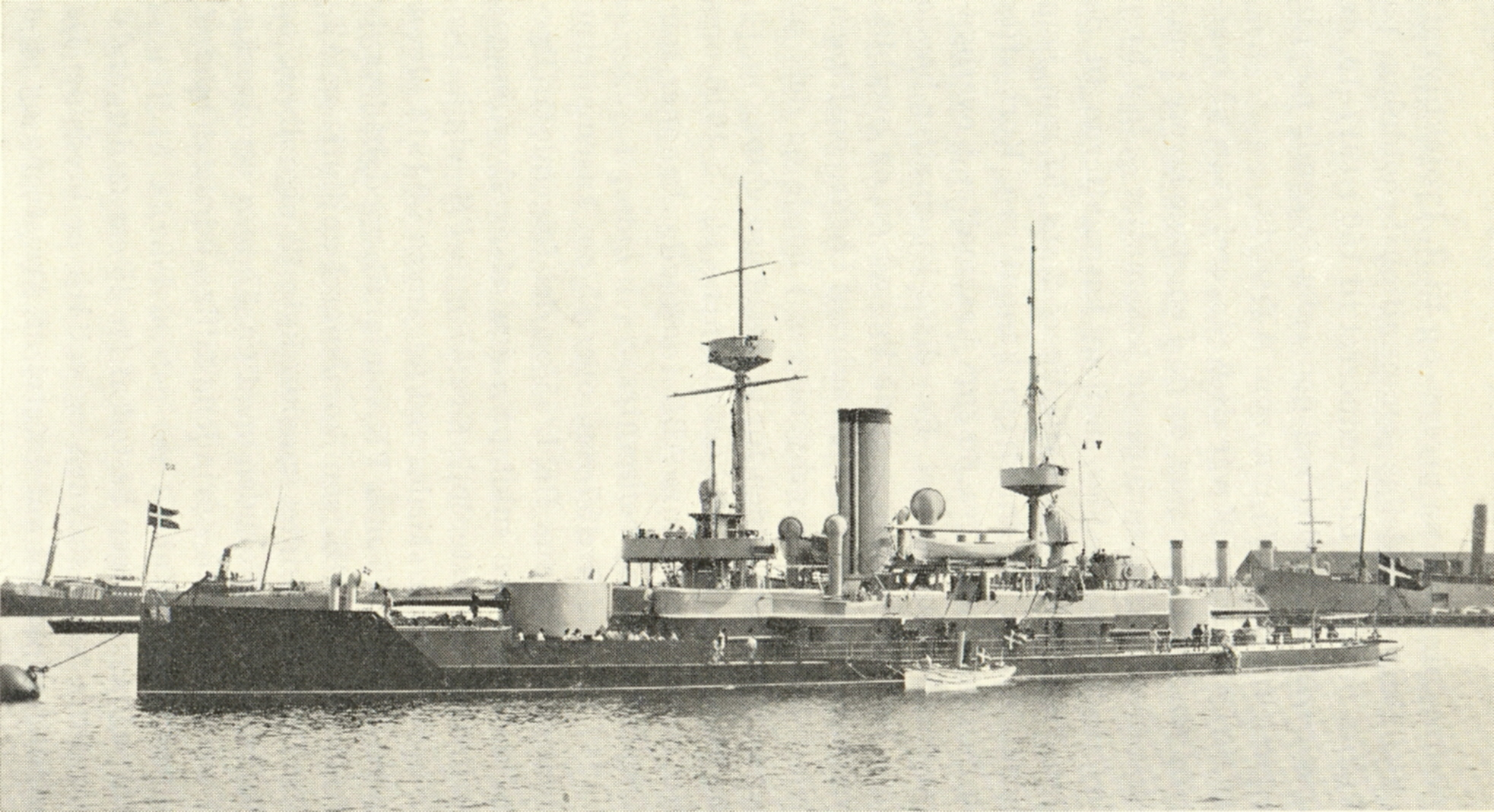
- HDMS Herluf Trolle

Class overview
- Name: Herluf Trolle class
- Builders: The Naval Dockyard
- Operators: Royal Danish Navy
- Subclasses: Peder Skram
- Completed: 3

General characteristics
- Type: Coastal defence ship
- Displacement: 3,494 tons
- Length: 82.87 m (271 ft 11 in)
- Beam: 15.06 m (49 ft 5 in)
- Draught: 4.93 m (16 ft 2 in)
- Propulsion: 4,200 hp (3,100 kW), two shafts
- Speed: 15.5 knots (28.7 km/h)
- Complement: 254
- Armament: 2 × 9.4 in (24 cm) (2 × 1); 4 × 15 cm (5.9 in) (4 × 1); 10 × 5.7 cm (2.2 in) (10 × 1); 3 × 45 cm (18 in) torpedo tubes
- Armour: 8 in (20 cm) belt; 7 in (18 cm) turret

The Herluf Trolle class was a class of coastal defence ships of the Royal Danish Navy. The class comprised Herluf Trolle, Olfert Fischer and Peder Skram.

== Design ==
=== Dimensions and machinery ===
The ships of the class were 82.87 metres (271 ft 11 in) long, had a beam of 15.06 metres (49 ft 5 in), a draught of 4.93 metres (16 ft 2 in), and had a displacement of 3,494 tons. The ships were equipped with 2 shaft reciprocating engines, which were rated at 4,200 ihp (3,100 kW) and produced a top speed of 15.5 knots (28.7 km/h; 17.8 mph).

=== Armour ===
The ships had belt armour of 8 in (20 cm) and 7 in (18 cm) turret armour.

=== Armament ===
The main armament of the ships were two 9.4 in (24 cm) single gun turrets. Secondary armament included four single 15 cm (5.9 in) guns and ten 5.7 cm (2.2 in) single guns.

== Construction ==
Herluf Trolle was laid down at the Copenhagen Navy Yard and launched on 1 January 1899. Olfert Fischer was also laid down at Copenhagen Navy Yard and was launched on 1 January 1902.

Construction data
Name	Builder	Laid down	Launched	Completed	Fate
Herluf Trolle	Copenhagen Naval Yard	20 Jul 1897	1 Sep 1899	7 Jun 1901	Stricken, Apr 1932
Olfert Fischer	Copenhagen Naval Yard	20 Oct 1900	9 May 1903	31 May 1905	Stricken, Oct 1936
Peder Skram	Copenhagen Naval Yard	24 Apr 1905	2 May 1908	24 Sep 1908	Scuttled during Operation Safari, 29 Aug 1943
