= HDMY Dannebrog (A540) =

Danish royal yacht

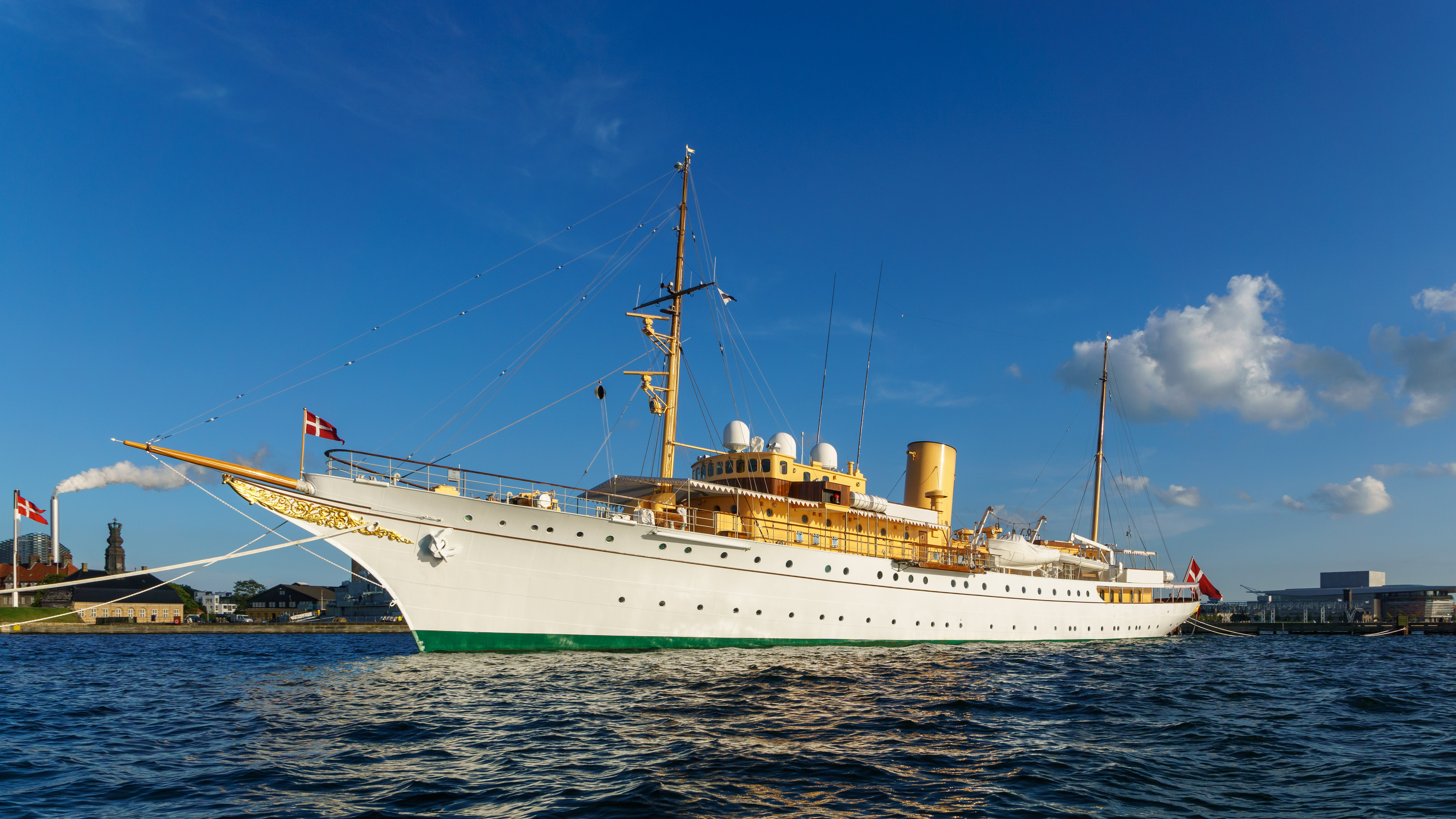
- Dannebrog, Copenhagen 2017

History

Kingdom of Denmark
- Name: Dannebrog
- Namesake: Flag of Denmark (Danish: Dannebrog)
- Laid down: 1931
- Launched: 1932
- Commissioned: 26 May 1932
- Identification: IMO number: 4537661; MMSI number: 219517000; Calsign: OUDA
- Status: In active service
- Badge

General characteristics
- Displacement: 1,238 t (1,218 long tons)
- Length: 78.43 m (257 ft 4 in)
- Beam: 10.4 m (34 ft 1 in)
- Height: 32 m (105 ft 0 in)
- Draft: 3.62 m (11 ft 11 in)
- Propulsion: 2 × B&W Alpha Diesel engines, type 6T23L-KVO, 870 hp (640 kW) each; 3 × Scania diesels, type DI12 62M 326 hp (240 kW) each
- Speed: 13.5 knots (15.5 mph; 25.0 km/h)
- Range: 3,600 nmi (6,700 km)
- Complement: 9 officers & 43 men of the Royal Danish Navy

His Danish Majesty's Yacht Dannebrog (A540) (Danish: KDM Dannebrog) serves as the official and private residence for King Frederik X, and members of the royal family when they are on official visits overseas and on summer cruises in Danish waters. The ship was launched by Queen Alexandrine at Copenhagen in 1931, and commissioned on 26 May 1932. When at sea, this royal yacht also participates in surveillance and sea-rescue services.

== Features ==
The Dannebrog, named after the flag of Denmark, was built in 1931–1932 at the Naval Dockyard in Copenhagen. She replaced the previous royal vessel, an 1879 paddle steamer, also called Dannebrog. The yacht originally had dual functions: to serve as the Royal Yacht in peacetime and to become a hospital ship in time of war. Given her age, however, it is highly unlikely that she would be called upon to resume the latter role in the 21st century.

The ship's hull is of rivetted steel construction on transverse frames. The ship has a clipper bow and an elliptical ('counter') stern. Viewed from the side, the ship may be divided into two sections. Forward of the funnel there is space for the crew, any cargo, and the engine. At the rear is the Royal Apartment, which could accommodate patients if ever the yacht were needed as a hospital ship. On visits to Danish and foreign ports the covered quarterdeck is used for receptions.

The Royal accommodation comprises studies for the King and the Queen Consort, a Dining Saloon, Lounge, Bedrooms, etc. The parents of the current King took a personal interest in fitting out the vessel and the choice of furnishings. The Royal Apartment contains furniture and fittings from the previous 1879 Royal vessel.

The Royal Yacht Dannebrog is an independent command, administered by the Chief of the King's Naval Household, who is a member of the Royal Household. The crew of the Dannebrog comprises 9 officers, 7 sergeants, 2 enlisted able-seamen and 34 conscripts. The officers are normally seconded for periods of two to four years, whereas the conscripts stay for just one summer.

== History ==
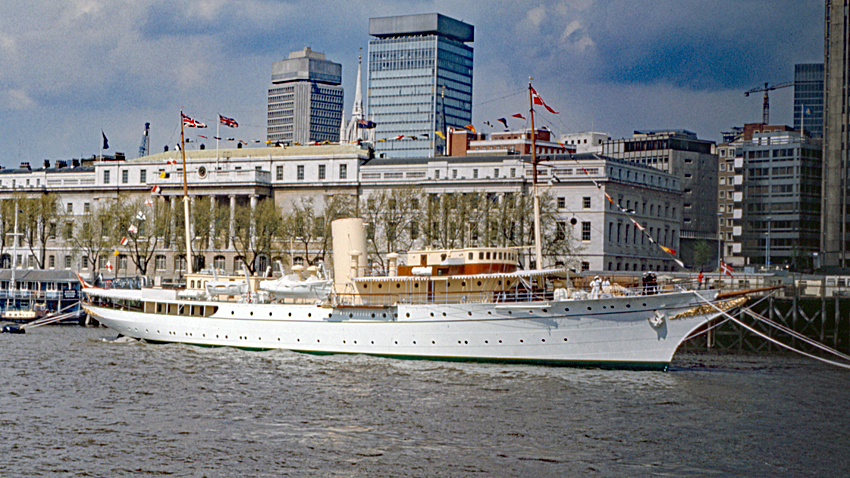
Dannebrog moored on the Thames during a state visit in 1974

Since she was commissioned in 1932, the Dannebrog has travelled more than 400,000 nautical miles (700,000 km) and visited most of the ports of Denmark, Greenland, and the Faroe Islands. The yacht has also visited European ports, especially in France and cruised the Mediterranean and the Caribbean Seas. Following Operation Safari, in 1943, Dannebrog was the only ship left untouched by the Germans. On 7 July 1956, Dannebrog collided with the British sloop HMS Redpole, breaking her bowsprit.

Jørgen Hviid served as one of the ship's captains. A major overhaul was carried out in 1980–81 to extend the life of the yacht into the 21st century. She is still in excellent condition, with major improvements having been made, including replacement of the main engines.
