= Orlogsværftet =

Shipyard in Denmark

Coordinates: 55.6828°N 12.6051°E

Navy Yard
- Orlogsværftet
- Part of Holmen Naval Base
- Denmark
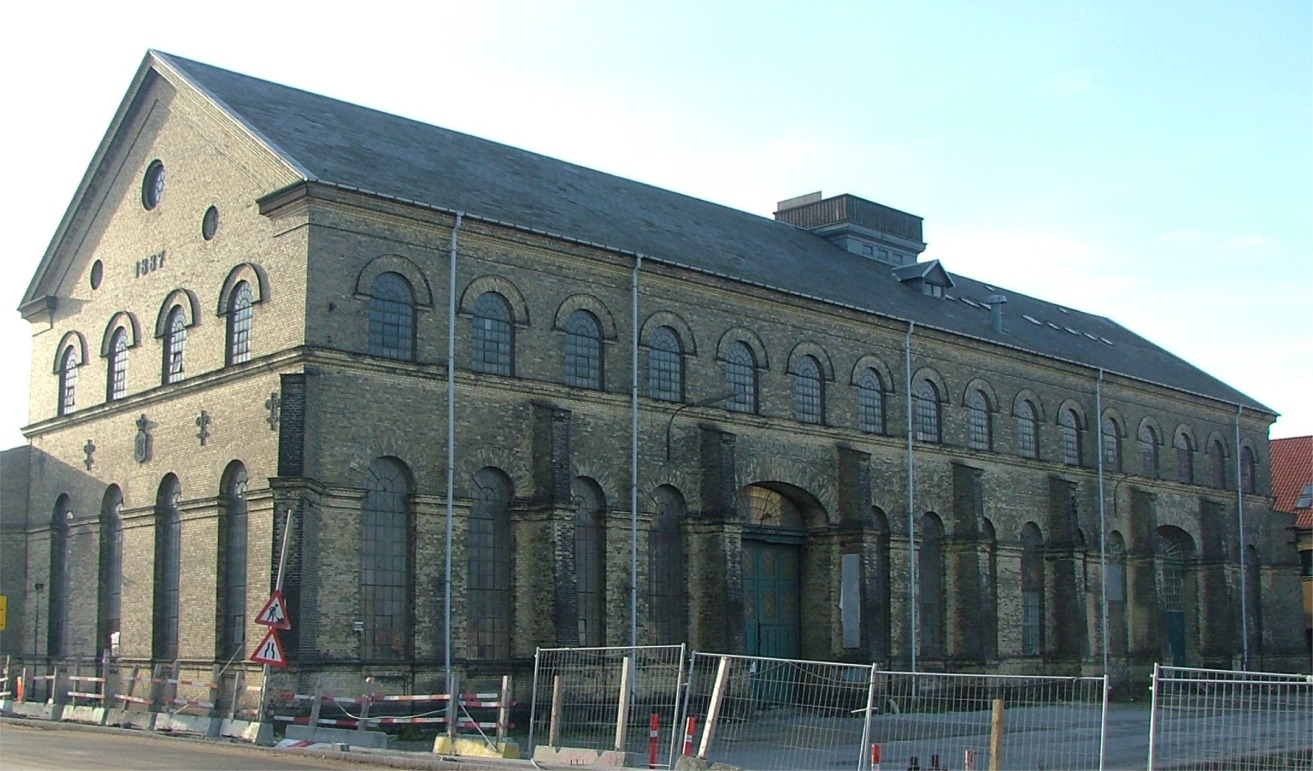
- Boiler factory at Orlogsværftet

Site history
- Built: 1690
- Fate: Closed in 1992

Orlogsværftet (lit. 'the War yard') was a Danish naval shipyard under the Royal Danish Navy. Before 1924, it was an integral part of the naval base at Holmen in central Copenhagen, Denmark. It has an independent management from 1692, when Olaus Judichær became the first factory director.

In 1924, the shipyard was established as a regular company under the Naval Ministry. They were given the responsibility to build and maintain naval ships and aircraft.

Orlogsværftet delivered its last newly built vessel in 1970, the submarine Nordkaperen, and continued as a repair yard until 1995— when the navy was moved out of Copenhagen to Korsør and Frederikshavn. Maersk-owned Odense Steel Shipyard replaced Orlogsværftet as the navy's primary shipyard.

In the 20th century, the ship yard also produced a smaller number of civilian vessels; including ferrys for the Danish State Railways, boats for the Royal Danish Mail and a single ship for GN Store Nord.

== Personnel ==
The chief designer at Orlogsværftet was given the title of Fabriksmester.

== List of ships launched from Orlogsværftet ==
- Frigate Bellona on 15 September 1830
- Ship of the Line Christian den Ottende on 22 May 1840
- Ship of the Line Dannebrog on 25 September 1850
- Frigate Jylland on 20 November 1860
- Corvette Dagmar on 1 November 1861
- Armored Schooner Diana on 11 November 1863
- Ironclad Lindormen on 6 August 1868
- Ironclad Odin on 12 December 1872
- Ironclad Helgoland on 9 May 1878
- Steam Ship Dannebrog on 6 October 1879
- Corvette Fyen on 27 September 1882
- Ironclad Iver Huitfeldt on 14 April 1886
- Cruiser Valkyrien on 8 September 1888
- Cruiser Hekla on 28 November 1890
- Cruiser Gejser on 5 July 1892
- Cruiser Heimdal on 30 August 1894
- Ironclad Herluf Trolle on 2 September 1899
- Ironclad Olfert Fischer on 9 May 1903
- Ironclad Peder Skram on 2 May 1908
- Submarine Havfruen on 21 August 1912, followed by another five A-class submarines until 2 October 1914
- Torpedo Boats Delfinen, Sværdfisken and Hvalrossen in 1913
- Submarine Ægir on 12 August 1914 followed by another four B-Class submarines until 15 April 1916
- Torpedo Boat Springeren followed by another nine Springeren-Class Torpedo Boats on 8 July 1916
- Coastal defence ship Niels Juel on 3 July 1918
- Submarine Bellona on 19 March followed by another two C-Class submarines until 2 April 1920
- Submarine Daphne on 9 December followed by the other D-Class submarine Dryaden on 3 June 1926
- Torpedo Boat Dragen followed by another two Dragen-Class Torpedo Boats on 8 November 1929
- Royal Yacht Dannebrog on 10 October 1931
- Torpedo Boat Glenten followed by another two Glenten-Class torpedo boats on 6 January 1933
- Mine sweeper Søløven followed by another five Søløven-Class Mine Sweepers on 3 December 1938
- Minelayer Lougen followed by Laaland on 14 March 1941
- Cutter Fænø followed by another six cutters on 13 June 1941
- Torpedo Boat Bille on 21 September 1946 followed by another five Krieger-Class Torpedo Boats
- Torpedo Boat Flyvefisken followed by another five Flyvefisken-Class torpedo boats on 11 May 1954 in cooperation with Frederikssund Shipyard
- Home Guard Cutter Saturn followed by another two cutters on 11 November 1957
- Minesweepers Asvig, Sælvig, Mosvig and Sandvig from 5 September 1960
- Torpedo Boat Falken followed by another three Falken-Class torpedo boats on 19 December 1961
- Torpedo Boat Søbjørnen followed by another three Søløven-Class Torpedo Boat on 19 August 1964.
- Submarine Narhvalen followed by another Narhvalen-class submarine on 10 September 1968

== Aircraft produced at Orlogsværftet ==
From 1913 to 1943, a series of aircraft were produced at Orlogsværftet, known under the name Orlogsværftet Flyvemaskineværksted (Orlogsværftet Flying Machine Workshop). After the navy purchased two Donnet-Leveque Flying Boats in 1913, the machines were improved in the workshops at Orlogsværftet, following poor performance in the initial flights. Following this effort the workshops produced a series of 8 flying boats powered by the imported 80 HP Gnome engines, serving until 1919. Another 25 flying boats were produced following improvements of the same design for military and civilian use.

In 1917, the workshops copied a German Friedrichshafen 29 Floatplane which had stranded in Denmark. As the floatplanes outperformed the flying boats, a shift was made towards this line of aircraft, and another four copies were made with 160 HP Curtiss or 150 HP Benz engines. Following a few years of service, a in house copy of the engine was manufactured under the name O.V. 160.

== See also ==
- Danish Shipbuilders
