= Denmark during World War I =

During the First World War (1914–1918), Denmark maintained its neutrality. The position of neutrality was agreed to by all the major political parties.

Denmark maintained trade with both sides of the war, and was among several neutral countries that exported canned meat to the German army. Danish speculators made fortunes on canned meat products, which were often of mediocre quality, while 275 Danish merchant ships were sunk, and approximately 700 Danish sailors perished during the war.

== Fortification measures ==
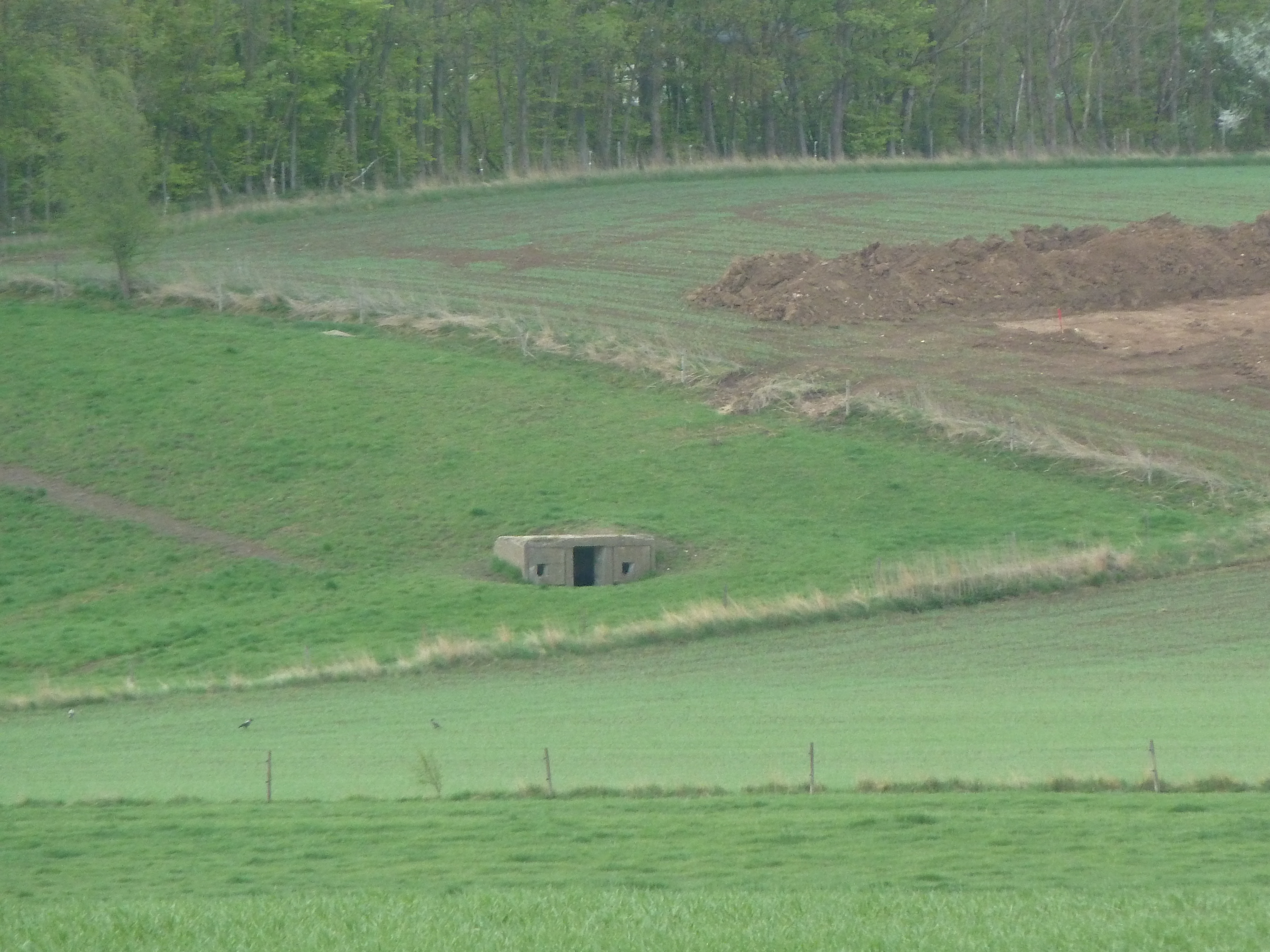
Remnants of Tunestillingen

At the outbreak of war, Denmark mobilized around 50,000 reservists to man Copenhagen's fortifications. This was about half the force that Denmark was expected to mobilize in case of war. By limiting its mobilization and calling the mobilized units "security forces" (Sikringsstyrken), the Danish government was trying to reassure the major powers that it was not intending to join the war.

An additional Tunestillingen ("Tune Line") defense installation was constructed during the war. It stretched from Køge Bay and to Roskilde Fjord and included the fortifications such as Mosede Fort, Karlslunde. The war brought to the fore the fact that Copenhagen's defences from the 1880s and 1890s were obsolete and too near the capital to protect it from modern artillery bombardment.

== Mining of Danish territorial waters ==
The Danish government bowed to pressure from Germany, and had naval mines laid in Danish waters with tacit British acceptance, despite the fact that Denmark was obliged under international law to keep its territorial waters open.

The Germans had already begun to mine Danish territorial waters in order to protect Germany from a British naval offensive. By mining its own waters, the Danish government sought to avoid giving Germany a pretext for an occupation.

== Ethnically Danish population of Southern Jutland ==
During the war, more than 30,000 ethnically Danish men from the Southern Jutland region in the Prussian Province of Schleswig-Holstein served in the German armed forces. In total, about 5,300 men from Southern Jutland fell during the war. A Danish military cemetery exists for soldiers fallen whilst fighting for Germany in the French commune of Braine in France. 79 Danish soldiers are buried there.

== Tondern raid ==
Imperial German Navy Zeppelins operated out of a base at Tønder, which was then part of Germany, until the base was attacked and destroyed by the Royal Navy and Royal Air Force in the Tondern raid of 19th July 1918. This was the only major allied raid on ethnically Danish Southern Jutland in the war.

== Post-war territorial changes ==
After the conclusion of the war, the 1920 Schleswig plebiscites were held in German territory in compliance with the Treaty of Versailles. Northern Schleswig was awarded to Denmark after 74.9% of the territory's population voted in favor of joining Denmark.
