= HDMY Dannebrog (1879) =

Former Danish royal yacht

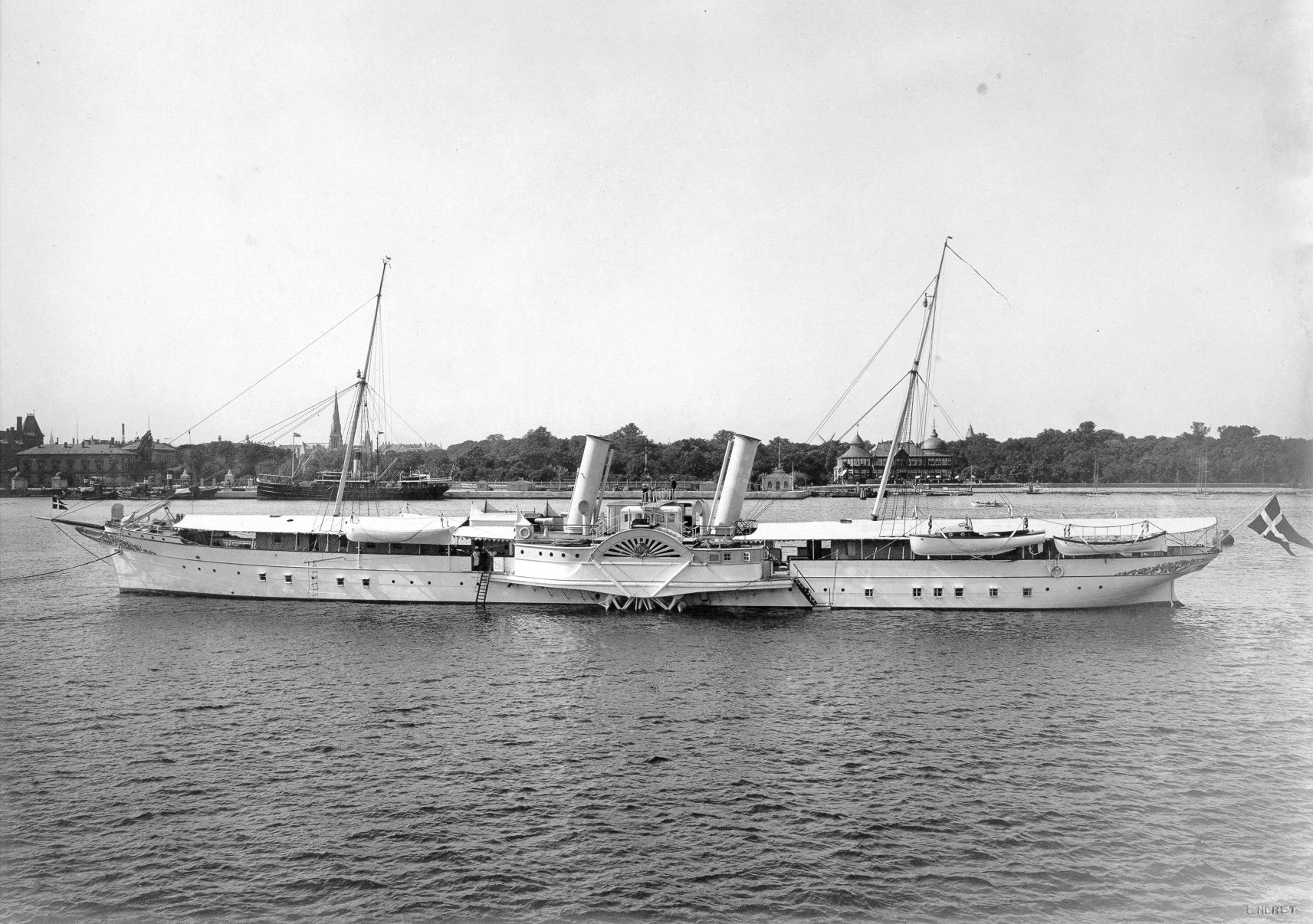
- Dannebrog in 1913, after overhaul repair dated 1907. Photo from the Danish Naval Museum (Orlogsmuseet), now kept in Nationalmuseet.

History

Denmark
- Name: Dannebrog
- Namesake: The flag of Denmark
- Launched: 6 October 1879
- Commissioned: 7 June 1880
- Decommissioned: 1931
- Fate: Scrapped in 1934.

General characteristics
- Length: 60.65 m before 1907 year and 72 m from 1907.
- Beam: 8.16 м
- Draft: 3.18 м
- Propulsion: side-wheel paddle steam yacht and from 1907 the yacht engines were changed to bigger size and two funnels installed
- Speed: 13.4 knots after repair in 1907
- Crew: 56

Dannebrog was a Danish royal side-wheel paddle steam yacht, which was built in 1879 and decommissioned in 1931. Dannebrog was named in honor of the flag of Denmark.

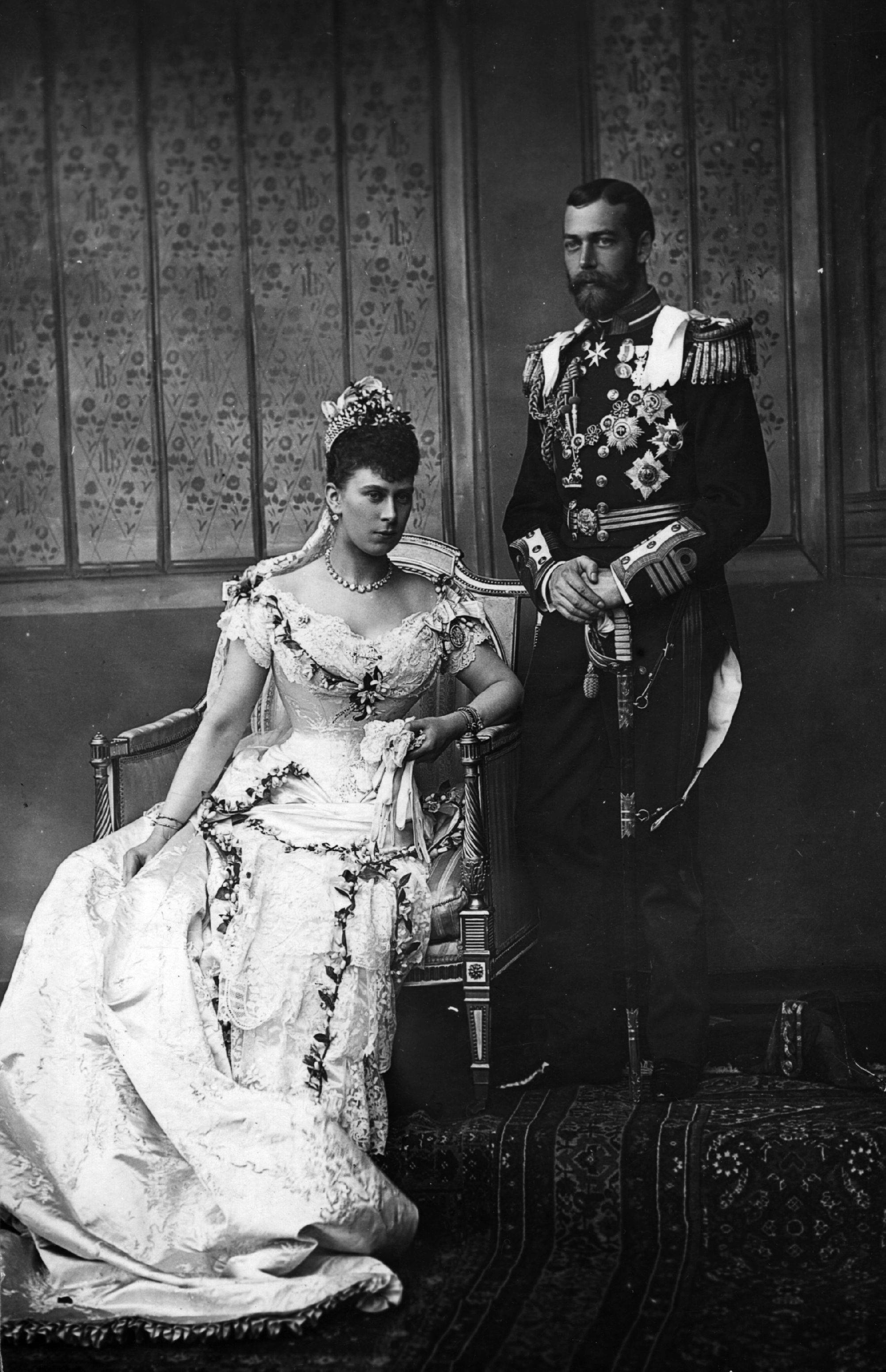
The Duke of York and Princess Mary of Teck on their wedding day in 1893.

== History ==
The paddle-wheel steamer 'Dannebrog was launched on 6 October 1879. The yacht was commissioned in the Danish Fleet on 7 June 1880. During the summer months of 1880-1892, Dannebrog made voyages in Danish waters and visited several foreign ports. There was also a voyage in 1893 to England, due to the marriage of the Duke of York and Princess Mary of Teck. The cruiser Valkyrien escorted the yacht during this voyage. There was a voyage to Aarhus in 1902 due to Crown Prince Christian and Princess Alexandrina receiving the Marselisborg Castle (Danish: slottet Marselisborg) as a present.

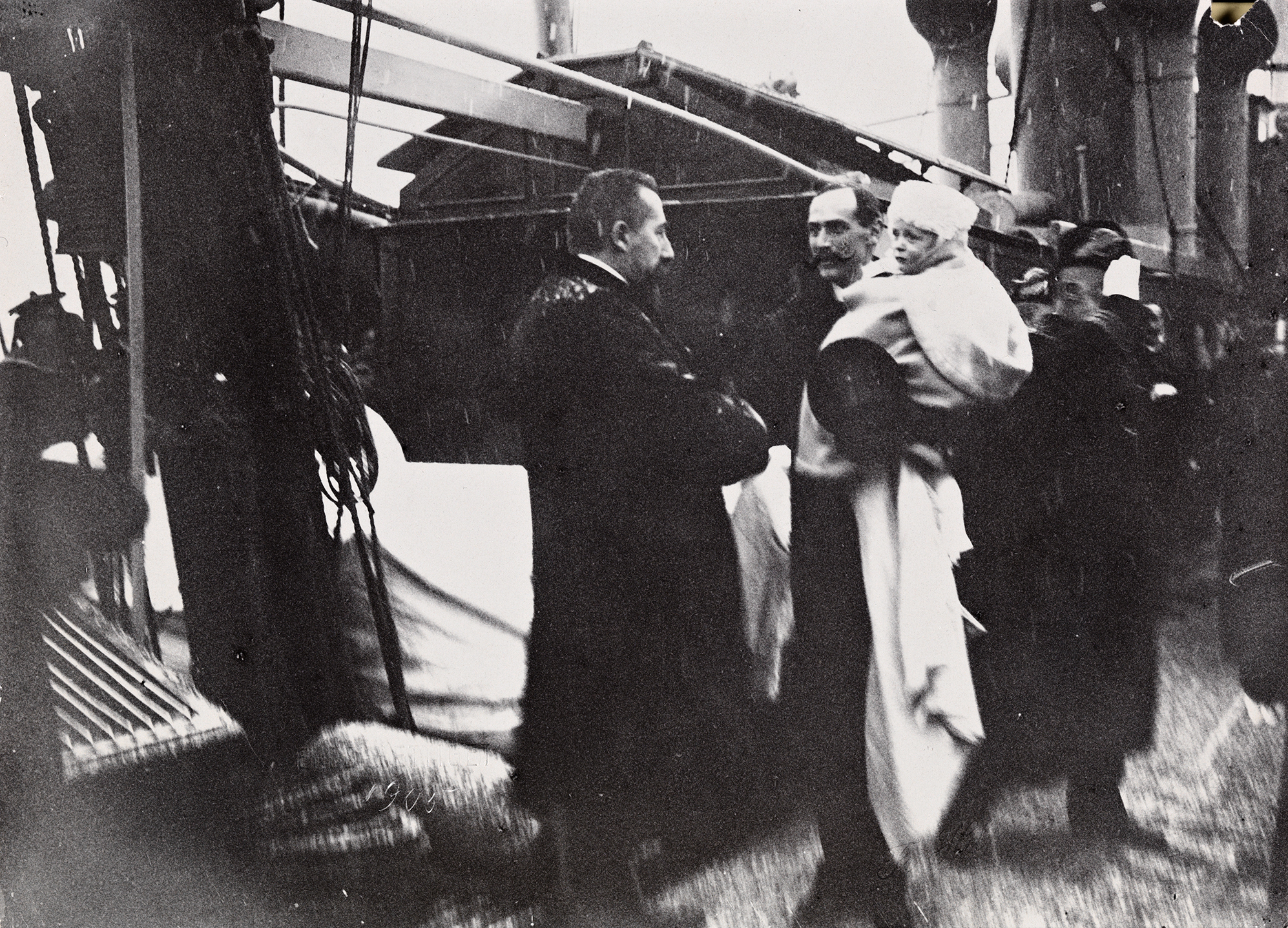
Norwegian Prime Minister Christian Michelsen welcomes the new King of Norway Haakon VII and Prince Olav on 25 November 1905

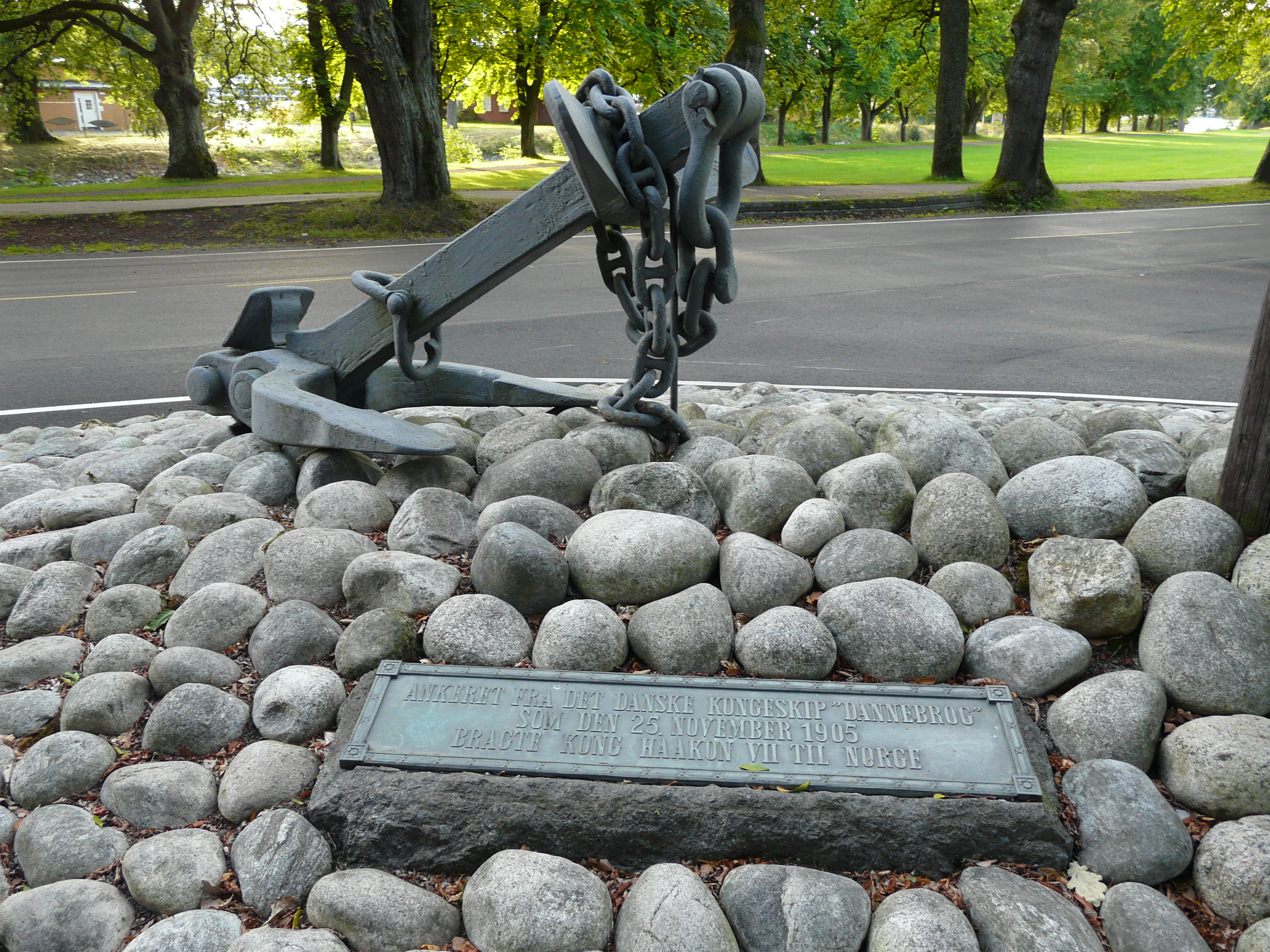
Anchor of the Dannebrog installed as monument in Horten, Norway.

Dannebrog brought the Danish prince Carl and his family from Denmark to Norway to assume the Norwegian throne, departing Denmark on 23 November 1905. His coronation as King Haakon VII was carried out in Trondheim in June 1906. From December 1906 - 1907, the yacht had an overhaul. Its length was increased to 72 meters and a newly designed main engine with bigger dimensions was installed. Simultaneously, tonnage was increased to 1,100 tonnes. Two funnels were installed on the yacht.

During the summer months of 1909, the yacht had an expedition in Danish waters, and from 11–23 July, voyaged to Russia, escorted by the cruiser Gejser. From 14–17 May 1912, Dannebrog sailed to Travemünde, to bring the coffin of King Frederik VIII (who had died in Hamburg on 14 May 1912) back to Copenhagen; she was escorted by the coastal defense ship Olfert Fische.

During the summer months of 1913, the yacht travelled Danish waters, and visited Landskrona (Sweden) and Rostock (Germany). In 1914, Dannebrog made trips to Sheerness, Dover, Calais, and Amsterdam, and then expeditions in the Danish waters. The yacht was idle during World War I, and underwent another expedition in Danish waters during the summer months of 1919. There was a voyage to South Jutland on 10 July 1920, for the occasion of the reunification. On 19 August 1929, she collided with the Japanese cargo ship Matsumoto Maru at Copenhagen. The yacht was scrapped in 1934.
