= 1780 =

1780 in various calendars
- Gregorian calendar: 1780; MDCCLXXX
- Ab urbe condita: 2533
- Armenian calendar: 1229; ԹՎ ՌՄԻԹ
- Assyrian calendar: 6530
- Balinese saka calendar: 1701–1702
- Bengali calendar: 1186–1187
- Berber calendar: 2730
- British Regnal year: 20 Geo. 3 – 21 Geo. 3
- Buddhist calendar: 2324
- Burmese calendar: 1142
- Byzantine calendar: 7288–7289
- Chinese calendar: 己亥年 (Earth Pig); 4477 or 4270 — to — 庚子年 (Metal Rat); 4478 or 4271
- Coptic calendar: 1496–1497
- Discordian calendar: 2946
- Ethiopian calendar: 1772–1773
- Hebrew calendar: 5540–5541
- Hindu calendars
- Vikram Samvat: 1836–1837
- Shaka Samvat: 1701–1702
- Kali Yuga: 4880–4881
- Holocene calendar: 11780
- Igbo calendar: 780–781
- Iranian calendar: 1158–1159
- Islamic calendar: 1193–1195
- Japanese calendar: An'ei 9 (安永９年)
- Javanese calendar: 1705–1706
- Julian calendar: Gregorian minus 11 days
- Korean calendar: 4113
- Minguo calendar: 132 before ROC 民前132年
- Nanakshahi calendar: 312
- Thai solar calendar: 2322–2323
- Tibetan calendar: ས་མོ་ཕག་ལོ་ (female Earth-Boar); 1906 or 1525 or 753 — to — ལྕགས་ཕོ་བྱི་བ་ལོ་ (male Iron-Rat); 1907 or 1526 or 754

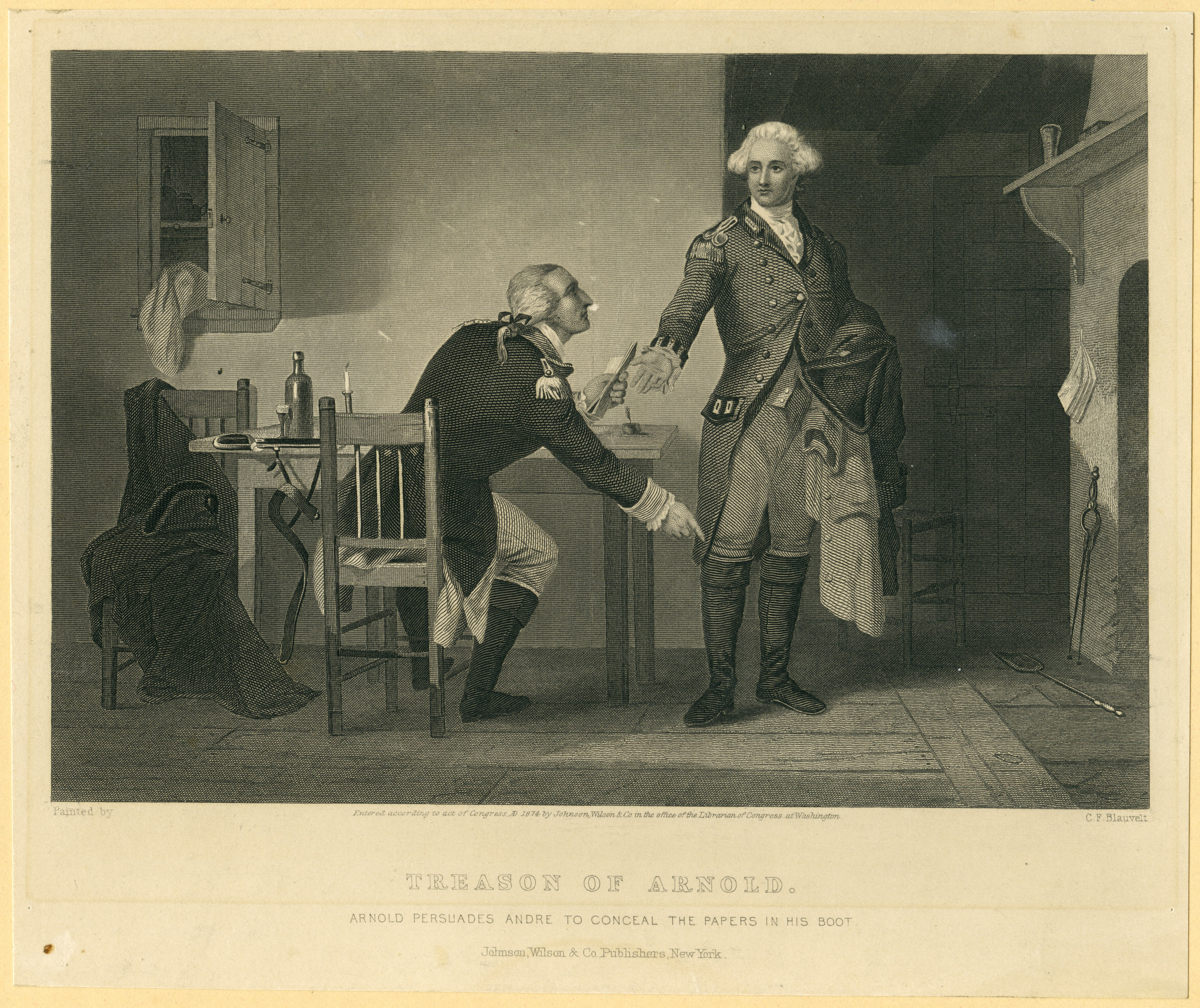
September 21: American Major General Benedict Arnold, commander of West Point, commits treason by supplying information to Britain's Major John Andre.

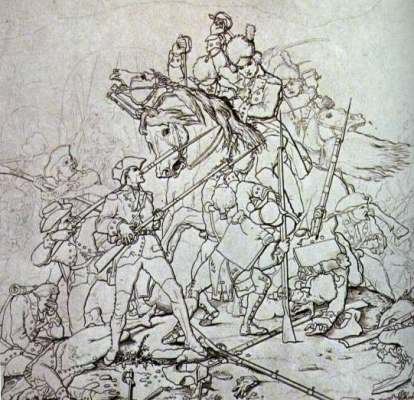
May 29: Waxhaw Massacre in America.

1780 (MDCCLXXX) was a leap year starting on Saturday of the Gregorian calendar and a leap year starting on Wednesday of the Julian calendar, the 1780th year of the Common Era (CE) and Anno Domini (AD) designations, the 780th year of the 2nd millennium, the 80th year of the 18th century, and the 1st year of the 1780s decade. As of the start of 1780, the Gregorian calendar was 11 days ahead of the Julian calendar, which remained in localized use until 1923.

== Events ==
=== January–March ===
- January 16 – American Revolutionary War – Battle of Cape St. Vincent: British Admiral Sir George Rodney defeats a Spanish fleet.
- February 19 – The legislature of New York votes to allow its delegates to cede a portion of its western territory to the Continental Congress for the common benefit of the war.
- March 1 – The legislature of Pennsylvania votes, 34 to 21, to approve An Act for the Gradual Abolition of Slavery.
- March 11
  - The First League of Armed Neutrality is formed by Russia with Denmark and Sweden to try to prevent the British Royal Navy from searching neutral vessels for contraband (February 28 O.S.).
  - General Lafayette embarks on French frigate Hermione at Rochefort, arriving in Boston on April 28, carrying the news that he has secured French men and ships to reinforce the American side in the American Revolutionary War.
- March 17 – American Revolutionary War: The British San Juan Expedition sails from Jamaica under the command of Captains John Polson and Horatio Nelson to attack the Captaincy General of Guatemala (modern-day Nicaragua) in New Spain.
- March 26 – The British Gazette and Sunday Monitor, the first Sunday newspaper in Britain, begins publication.

=== April–June ===
- April 16 – The University of Münster in Münster, North Rhine-Westphalia, Germany is founded.
- April 29 – American Revolutionary War: The Spanish commander of the Fortress of the Immaculate Conception on the San Juan River in modern-day Nicaragua surrenders it to the British San Juan Expedition.
- May 4 – The first Epsom Derby horse race is run on Epsom Downs, Surrey, England. The victor is Diomed.
- May 12 – American Revolutionary War: Charleston, South Carolina is taken by British forces after 44 days of siege.
- May 13 – The Cumberland Compact is signed by American settlers, in the Cumberland Valley of Tennessee.
- May 19 – New England's Dark Day: An unaccountable darkness spreads over New England, regarded by some observers as a fulfillment of Bible prophecy.
- May 29 – American Revolutionary War – Waxhaw Massacre: Loyalist forces under Colonel Banastre Tarleton kill surrendering American soldiers.
- June 2 – An Anti-Catholic mob led by Lord George Gordon marches on the Parliament of Great Britain, leading to the outbreak of the Gordon Riots in London.
- June 7 – The Gordon Riots in London are ended by the intervention of troops. About 285 people are shot dead, with another 200 wounded and around 450 arrested.
- June 23 – American Revolutionary War – Battle of Springfield: The Continental Army defeats the British in New Jersey.

=== July–September ===
- July 11 – French soldiers arrive in Newport, Rhode Island to reinforce the colonists, in the American Revolutionary War.
- July 17 – The first bank created in the United States, the Bank of Pennsylvania, is chartered.
- August 9 – American Revolutionary War: Spanish admiral Luis de Córdova y Córdova captures a British convoy totalling 55 vessels amongst Indiamen, frigates and other cargo ships off Cape St. Vincent.
- August 16 – American Revolutionary War – Battle of Camden: British troops inflict heavy losses on a Patriot army at Camden, South Carolina.
- August 24 – King Louis XVI abolishes the use of torture in extracting confessions in French law courts.
- September 21 – Benedict Arnold gives detailed plans of West Point to Major John André. Three days later, André is captured, with papers revealing that Arnold was planning to surrender West Point to the British.
- September 25 – Benedict Arnold flees to British-held New York.
- September 29 – The Danish ship-of-the-line Printz Friderich runs aground on the Kobbergrund shoal and is a total loss

=== October–December ===
- October 2 – American Revolutionary War: In Tappan, New York, British spy John André is hanged by American forces.
- October 7 – American Revolutionary War: Battle of Kings Mountain: Patriot militia forces annihilate Loyalists under British Major Patrick Ferguson, at Kings Mountain, South Carolina.
- October 10–16 – The Great Hurricane flattens the islands of Barbados, Martinique and Sint Eustatius; 22,000 are killed.
- November 4 – Rebellion of Túpac Amaru II: In the Spanish Viceroyalty of Peru, Túpac Amaru II leads an uprising of Aymara and Quechua peoples and mestizo peasants as a protest against the Bourbon Reforms.
- November 28 – A lightning strike in Saint Petersburg begins a fire that burns 11,000 homes.
- November 29 – Maria Theresa of Austria dies in Vienna after 40 years of rule, and her Habsburg dominions pass to her ambitious son, Joseph II, who has already been Holy Roman Emperor since 1765.
- November 30 – American Revolutionary War: The British San Juan Expedition is forced to withdraw.
- December 14 – Alexander Hamilton marries Elizabeth Schuyler Hamilton
- December 16 – Emperor Kōkaku accedes to the throne of Japan.
- December 20 – The Fourth Anglo-Dutch War begins.

=== Date unknown ===
- Jose Gabriel Kunturkanki, businessman and landowner, proclaims himself Inca Túpac Amaru II.
- The Duke of Richmond calls, in the House of Lords of Great Britain, for manhood suffrage and annual parliaments, which are rejected.
- Jeremy Bentham's Introduction to Principles of Morals and Legislation, presenting his formulation of utilitarian ethics, is printed (but not published) in London.
- Nikephoros Theotokis starts introducing Edinoverie, an attempt to integrate the Old Believers into Russia's established church.
- The Woodford Reserve bourbon whiskey distillery begins operation in Kentucky.
- In Ireland, Lady Berry, who is sentenced to death for the murder of her son, is released when she agrees to become an executioner (she retires in 1810).
- The Jameson Irish Whiskey distillery is founded in Dublin, Ireland.
- The original Craven Cottage is built by William Craven, 6th Baron Craven, in London, on what will become the centre circle of Fulham F.C.'s pitch.
- The amateur dramatic group Det Dramatiske Selskab is founded in Christiania, Norway.
- Western countries pay 16,000,000 ounces of silver for Chinese goods.
- The Kingdom of Great Britain reaches c.9 million population.

== Births ==
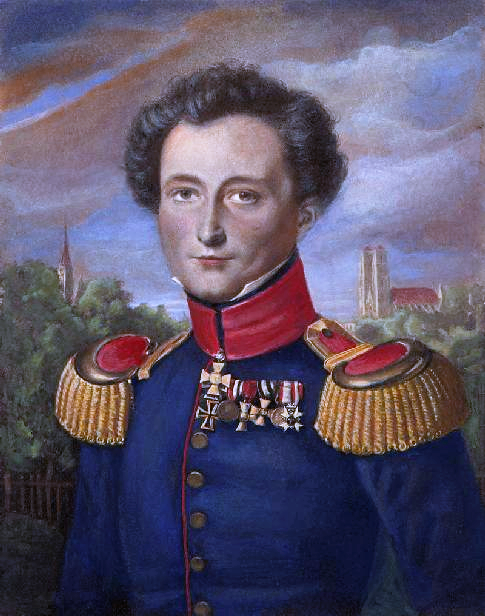
Carl von Clausewitz

- January 13 – Pierre Jean Robiquet, French chemist (d. 1840)
- January 14 – Henry Baldwin, Associate Justice of the Supreme Court of the United States (d. 1844)
- February 1 – David Porter, American naval officer (d. 1843)
- February 2 – Johannes van den Bosch, Governor-General of the Dutch East Indies (d. 1844)
- February 3 – Mihail G. Boiagi, Aromanian grammarian and professor (d. uncertain)
- February 19 – Richard McCarty, American politician (d. 1844)
- February 25 – John Sumner, Archbishop of Canterbury (d. 1862)
- February 28 – Leonard du Bus de Gisignies, Governor-General of the Dutch East Indies (d. 1849)
- March 25 – Joseph Ritner, American politician (d. 1869)
- March 29 – Jørgen Jørgensen, Danish adventurer (d. 1841)
- April 7 – William Ellery Channing, influential American Unitarian theologian and minister (d. 1842)
- April 26 – Gotthilf Heinrich von Schubert, German naturalist (d. 1860)
- April 29 – Charles Nodier, French author (d. 1844)
- May 1 – John McKinley, American politician, Associate Justice of the Supreme Court of the United States (d. 1852)
- May 21 – Elizabeth Fry, British humanitarian (d. 1845)
- May 29 – Henri Braconnot, French chemist, pharmacist (d. 1855)
- June 1 – Carl von Clausewitz, Prussian military strategist (d. 1831)
- July 4 – Sofia Hjärne, Finnish baroness, writer (d. 1860)
- July 5 – François Carlo Antommarchi, French physician (d. 1838)
- July 15 – Emilie Petersen, Swedish philanthropist (d. 1859)
- July 27 – Anastasio Bustamante, 4th President of Mexico (d. 1853)
- August 29
  - Jean-Auguste-Dominique Ingres, French painter (d. 1867)
  - Richard Rush, United States Attorney General under James Madison, United States Secretary of the Treasury under President
- October 20 – Pauline Bonaparte, Italian noblewoman (d. 1825)
- October 28 – Ernst Anschütz, German teacher, organist, poet, and composer (d. 1861)
- November 13 – Ranjit Singh, Maharaja of The Punjab (Sikh Empire), (d. 1839)
- December 13 – Johann Wolfgang Döbereiner, German chemist (d. 1849)
- December 26 – Mary Fairfax Somerville, British mathematician (d. 1872)

=== Date unknown ===
- James Justinian Morier, British diplomat and novelist (d. 1849)
- Manuela Medina, Mexican national heroine (d. 1822)
- Elizabeth Philpot, British paleontologist (d. 1857)
- Jahonotin Uvaysiy, Uzbek Sufi poet (d. 1845)

== Deaths ==
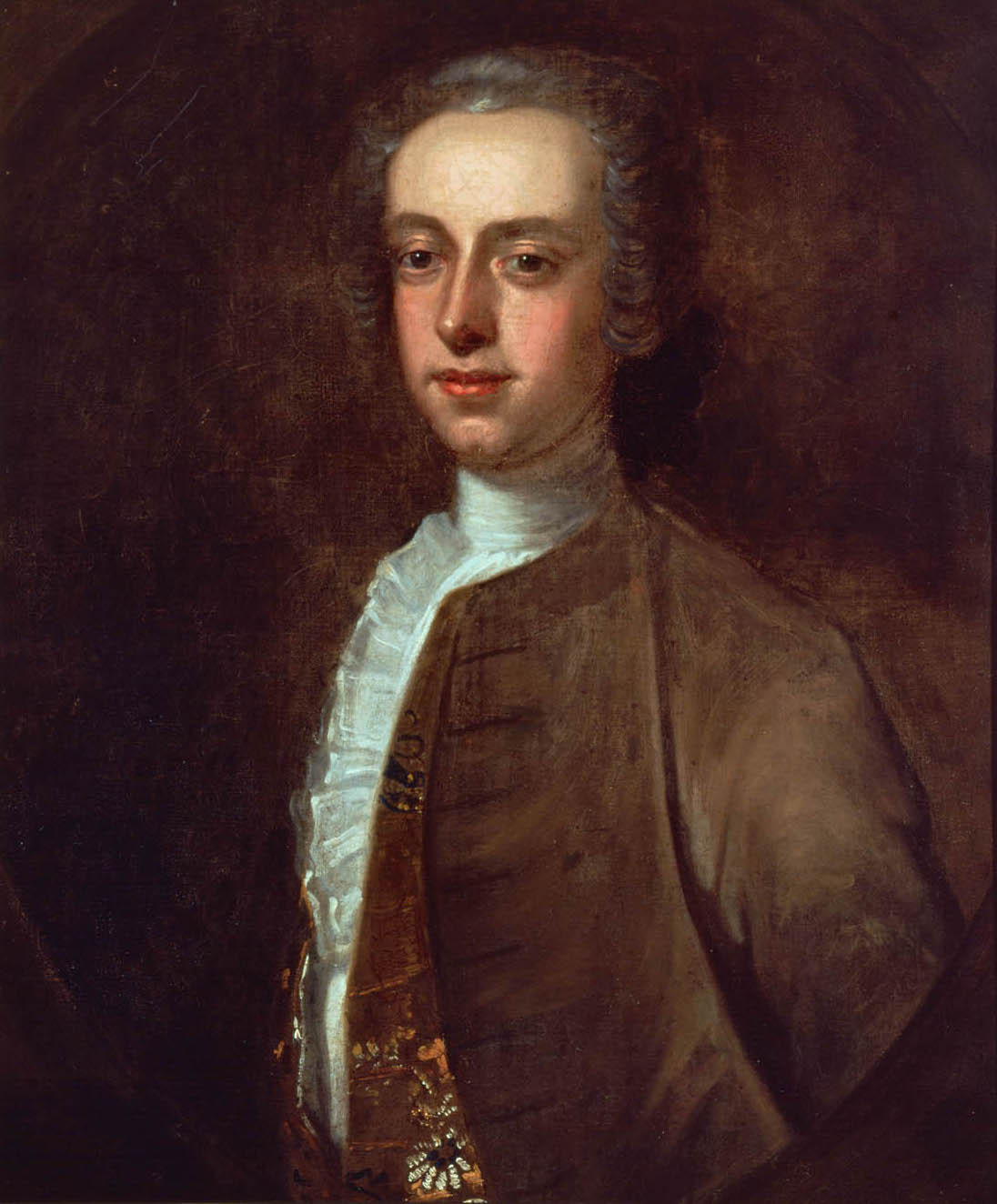
Thomas Hutchinson

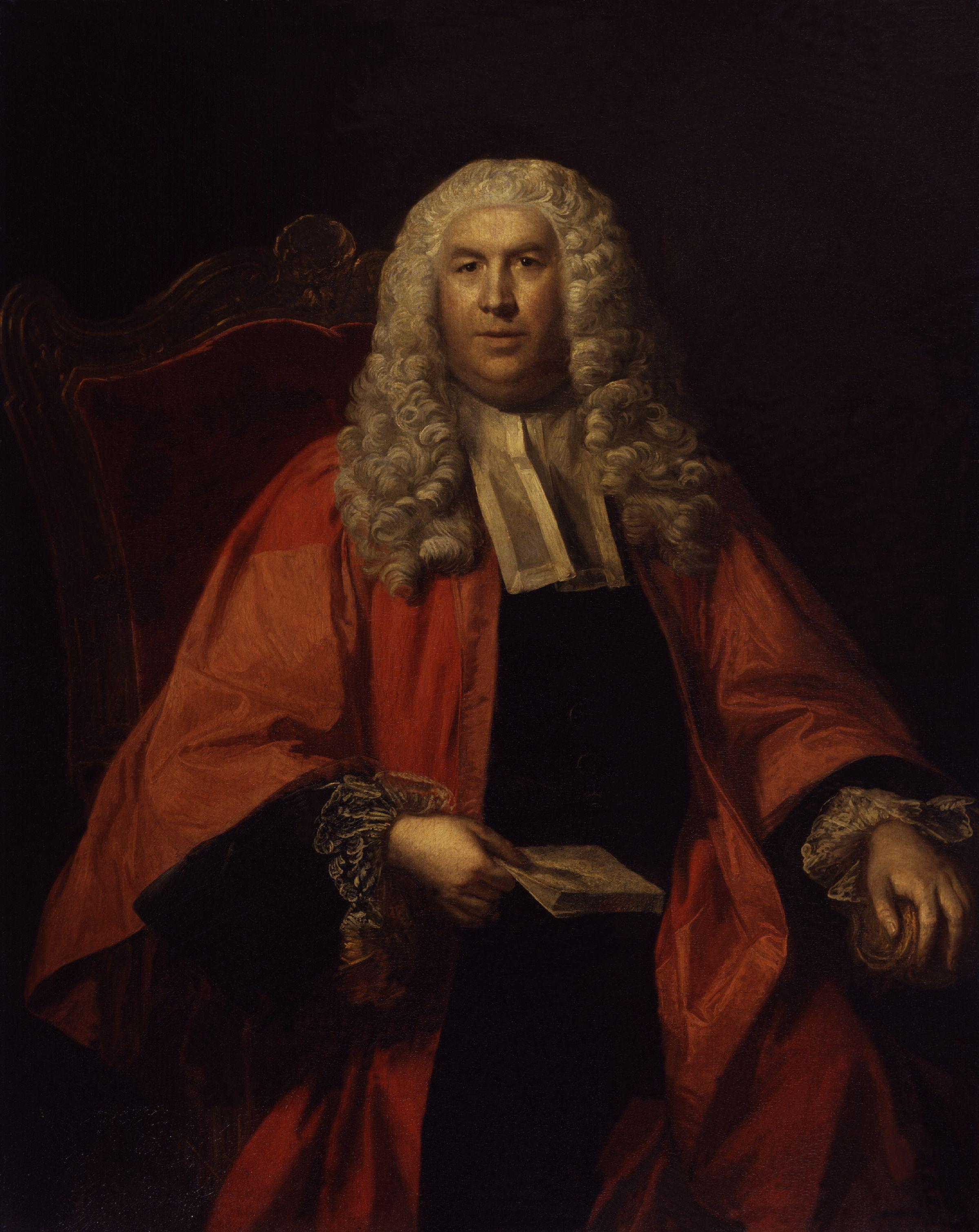
William Blackstone

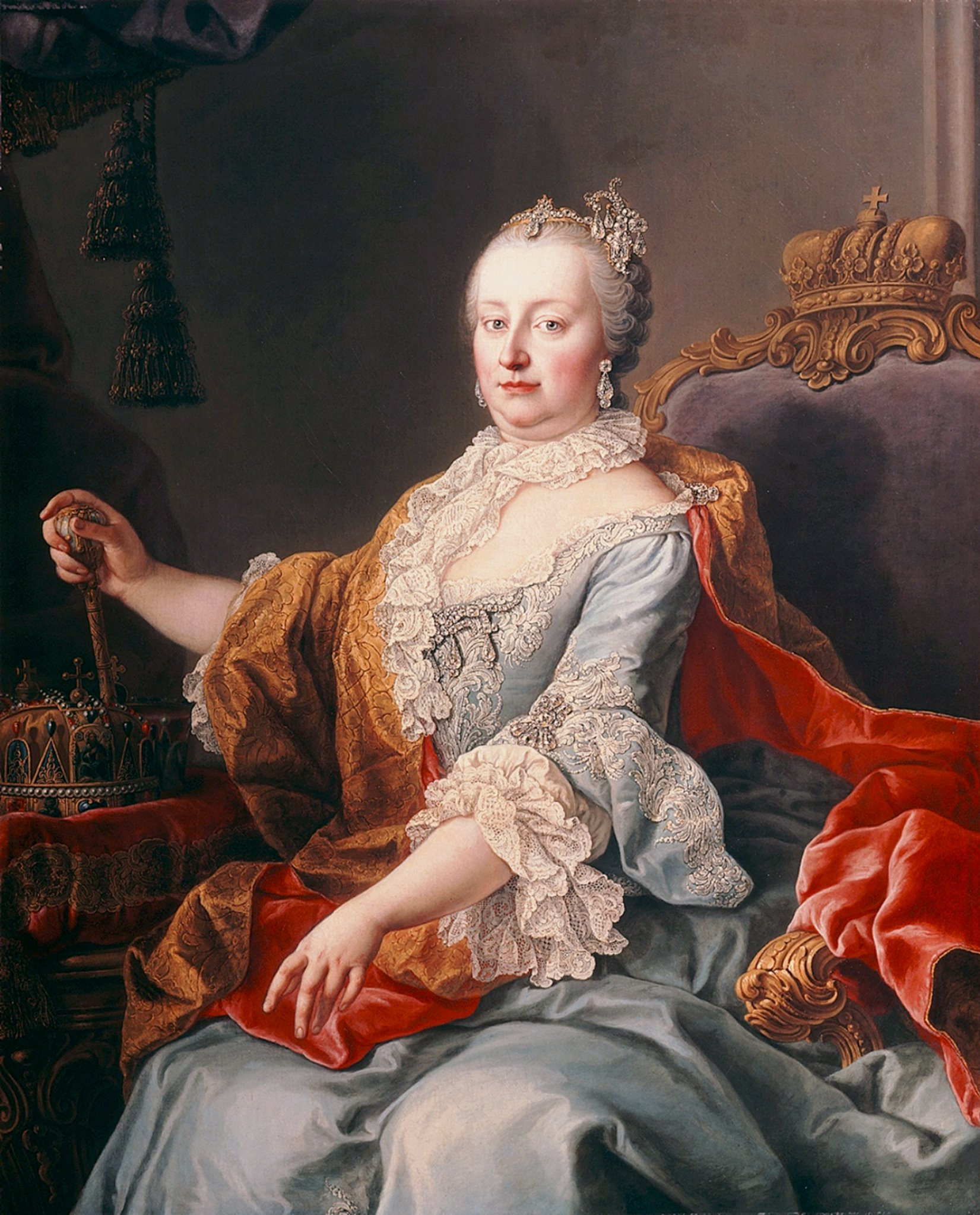
Empress Maria Theresa

- January 13 – Duchess Luise of Brunswick-Wolfenbüttel, Prussian princess (b. 1722)
- January 15 – Johann Rudolf Tschiffeli, Swiss agronomist (b. 1716)
- February 10 – Samuel Egerton, British Member of Parliament (b. 1711)
- February 14 – William Blackstone, English jurist (b. 1723)
- February 17 – Andreas Felix von Oefele, German historian, librarian (b. 1706)
- February 18 – Kristijonas Donelaitis, Lithuanian poet (b. 1714)
- March 17 – Elizabeth Butchill, English woman executed for the murder of her newborn child (b. c. 1758)
- March 26 – Charles I, Duke of Brunswick-Wolfenbüttel (b. 1713)
- April 5 – Ulrika Strömfelt, Swedish courtier (b. 1724)
- May 18 – Charles Hardy, British governor of Newfoundland (b. c. 1714)
- May 21 – Thomas Townshend (MP), British politician (b. 1701)
- June 3 – Thomas Hutchinson, American colonial governor of Massachusetts (b. 1711)
- July 4 – Prince Charles Alexander of Lorraine, Austrian military leader (b. 1712)
- July 14 – Charles Batteux, French philosopher (b. 1713)
- July 18 – Gerhard Schøning, Norwegian historian (b. 1722)
- July 21 – Louis Legrand, French Sulpician priest and theologian (b. 1711)
- August 3 – Étienne Bonnot de Condillac, French philosopher (b. 1715)
- August 19 – Johann de Kalb, Bavarian-French military officer who served as a major general in the Continental Army during the American Revolutionary War (b. 1721)
- August 29 – Jacques-Germain Soufflot, French architect (b. 1713)
- September 1 – Reynier de Klerck, Dutch colonial governor (b. 1710)
- September 4 – John Fielding, English magistrate, social reformer (b. 1721)
- September 6 – Françoise Basseporte, French painter (b. 1701)
- September 8
  - Enoch Poor, American Revolutionary general (b. 1736)
  - Jeanne-Marie Leprince de Beaumont, French writer (b. 1711)
- September 15 – Jacob Rodrigues Pereira, academic, first teacher of deaf-mutes in France (b. 1715)
- September 19 – James Cecil, 6th Earl of Salisbury, England (b. 1713)
- September 23 – Marie Anne de Vichy-Chamrond, marquise du Deffand, French salon holder (b. 1697)
- October 2 – John André, British Army officer of the American Revolutionary War (executed) (b. 1750)
- October 17 – William Cookworthy, English chemist (b. 1705)
- November 26 – Sir James Steuart, Scottish economist (b. 1712)
- November 29 – Empress Maria Theresa of Austria (b. 1717)
- December 12 – Jakab Fellner, Hungarian architect (b. 1722)
- December 26 – John Fothergill, English physician (b. 1712)
- date unknown – Thomas Dilworth, British cleric and writer
