= Admiral Bille =

Admiral Bille may refer to:

- Bendix Lasson Bille (1723–1784), Royal Danish Navy rear admiral
- Daniel Ernst Bille (1711–1790), Royal Danish Navy rear admiral
- Michael Bille (1680–1756) (1680–1756), Royal Danish Navy vice admiral
- Michael Johannes Petronius Bille (born 1769), Royal Danish Navy vice admiral
- Steen Andersen Bille (1751–1833) (1751–1833), Royal Danish Navy admiral
- Steen Andersen Bille (1797–1883) (1797–1883), Royal Danish Navy vice admiral
