= HDMS Printz Friderich =

HDMS Printz Friderich is the name of the following ships of the Royal Danish Navy:

- HDMS Printz Friderich (1727), a 78-gun ship of the line designed by Rasmus Krag
- HDMS Printz Friderich (1764), a 70-gun ship of the line designed by Frederik Michael Krabbe, wrecked at Kobbergrund in 1780
