= Steen Andersen Bille =

The name of Steen Andersen Bille is closely associated with one extended Bille family of Danish naval officers over several generations.

In a direct line from one Vice-Commandant of the City of Copenhagen in the later 17th century, a long list of distinguished Danish naval officers emerged – including six admirals, two commanders and six captains. Many of these had the same name as their progenitor.

== Progenitor ==
Colonel and Vice-Commandant of Copenhagen, Steen Andersen Bille (1624–1698).

== Family tree ==
Karen née Mandixsen (1635–1681)

Colonel Steen Andersen Bille (1624–1698)

Rebekka Elisabeth Poppe (?–1698)

Captain Just Bille (1670–1749)

Catherine née Maule (1672–1756)

First Marriage Mette Glud (1699–1720)

Admiral Michael Bille (1680-1756)

Second marriage to Karen née Lasson (1703–1779)

Rear Admiral Daniel Ernst Bille (1711–1790)

Johanne Sophie Amalie née Stibolt (1717–1788)

Rear Admiral Bendix Lasson Bille (1723–1784)

Lieutenant Steen Andersen Bille (1725–1748)

Adolphine Christine née Friedenreich (1740–1771)

Captain Mathias Bille (1736–1782)

Anna Rebekka née Bredahl (1754–1847)

Commander Just Bille (1744–1802)

Admiral Steen Andersen Bille (1751–1833)

Frederikke Wilhelmina Charlotte née Borneman (1770–1851)

Charlotte Margrette Bille (1739–1804)

Captain Anders Bille (1730–1782) (no direct blood relation)

Rear Admiral Michael Johannes Petronius Bille (1769–1845)

Captain Søren Adolph Bille (1775–1819)

Lieutenant Ernst Wilhelm Bille (1795–1821)

Vice Admiral Steen Andersen Bille (1797–1883)

Caroline Christiane Sophie Fredericke von Bülow (1808–1887)

Captain Daniel Ernst Bille (1770–1807)

Captain Steen Andersen Bille (1830–1905)

== List ==
- Bendix Lasson Bille (23 November 1723 – 5 October 1784), rear admiral.
- Daniel Ernst Bille (7 April 1711 – 25 February 1790), rear admiral.
- Daniel Ernst Bille (22 September 1770 – 24 February 1807), captain.
- Ernst Wilhelm Bille (9 September 1795 – 15 March 1821), senior lieutenant; unmarried.
- Just Bille (1670–1749), captain. (Note: Captain Just Bille may have been an army captain, as he left a debt to the Bornholm Infantry regiment. He does not have his own section in the Topsøe-Jensen book on naval officers)
- Just Bille (13 March 1744 – 17 January 1802), commander; no issue.
- Mathias Bille (17 February 1736 – 17 March 1782), captain (Note: Mathias Bille died after a hurricane on Ireland’s NW coast.)
- Michael Bille (14 May 1680 – 2 May 1756), admiral.
- Michael Johannes Petronius Bille (8 November 1769 – 27 March 1845), rear admiral.
- Steen Andersen Bille (1624–1698), colonel.
- Steen Andersen Bille (27 March 1725 – 23 September 1748), junior lieutenant; unmarried.
- Steen Andersen Bille (23 August 1751 – 15 April 1833), admiral; actions: Action of 16 May 1797, Battle of Copenhagen, Gunboat War.
- Steen Andersen Bille (5 December 1797 – 2 May 1883), vice admiral.
- Steen Andersen Bille (24 July 1830 – 3 June 1905), captain.
- Søren Adolph Bille (4 June 1775 – 12 September 1819), captain. (Note: Søren Bille was with the brig Lougen in 1793-4 in the Danish West Indies. In 1801 he was second-in-command of the blockship Cronborg when he was wounded in the Battle of Copenhagen, but still assumed command after the death of the captain. He recaptured Allart on 10 August 1809. In 1814, when Norway and Denmark separated, he joined the Norwegian navy.)

Others (Note: A further seven Danish naval officers with the surname Bille, but apparently unrelated to Steen Andersen Bille, are listed by Topsøe-Jensen. These are Anders, Christian Lodberg, Gabriel, Gerhardt Sivert, Hans Martin, Jørgen, and Lars.)

== Family burial plot ==
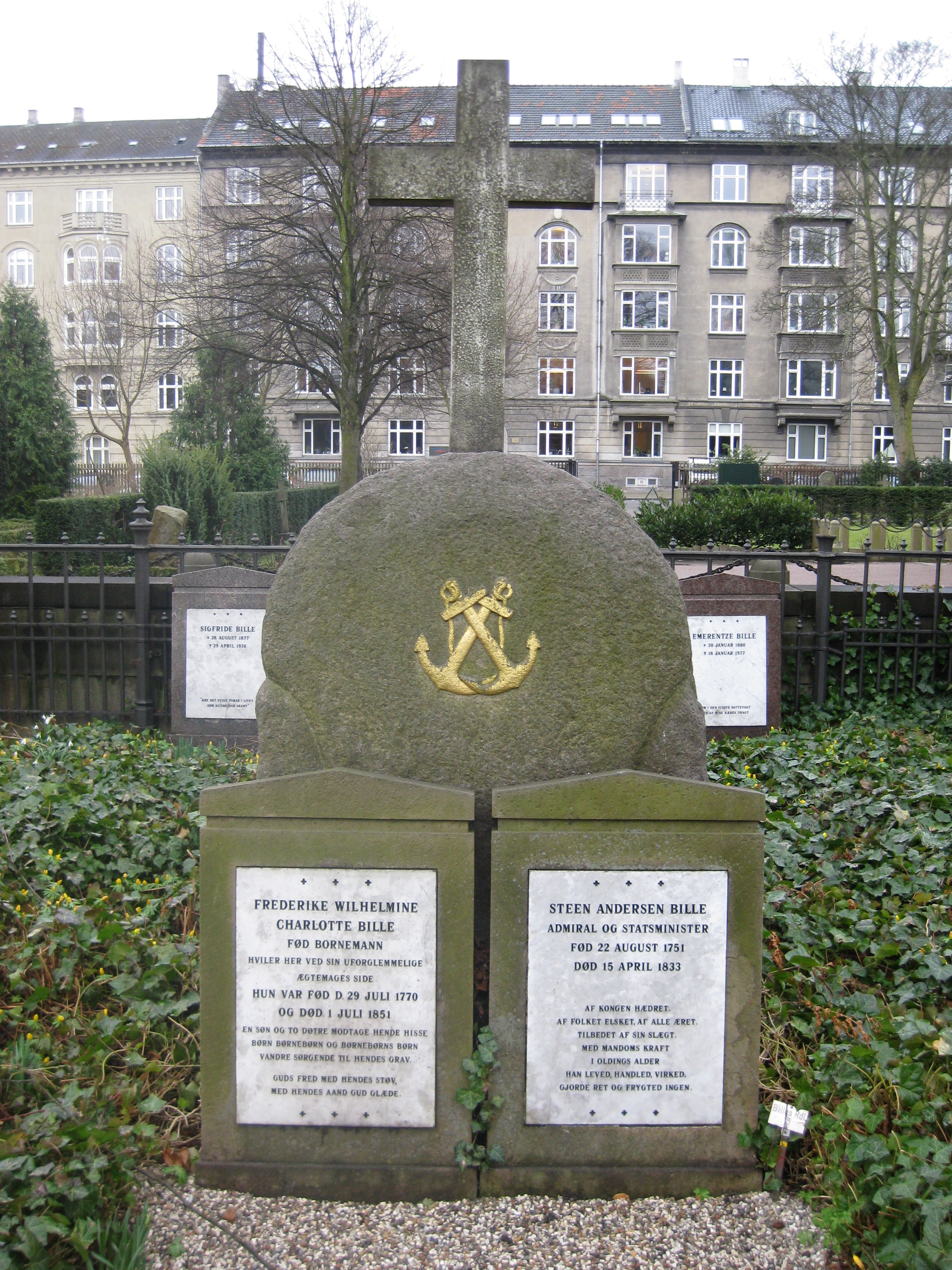
Many descendants from Steen Andersen Bille (1751–1833) are buried in the Cemetery of Holmen

Many members of the Bille family from Steen Andersen Bille (1751–1833) and his wife onwards are buried at the Cemetery of Holmen (Danish: Holmens Kirkegård) in Copenhagen.

== Bille ==
Two ships have been named Bille in relatively recent times in the Royal Danish Navy:

- Bille (1946) a torpedo boat with a speed of 29 knots. Decommissioned 1959
- Bille (1976) a Willemoes-class torpedo boat, later fitted with two harpoon missiles. Named after Admiral S A Bille (1751–1833)

== Citations ==
- (in Danish)T. A. Topsøe-Jensen og Emil Marquard (1935) “Officerer i den dansk-norske Søetat 1660-1814 og den danske Søetat 1814-1932“. Volume 1 and Volume 2
- Balsved - Danish Naval History website
