= Michael Bille =

Michael Bille may refer to:

- Michael Bille (1680–1756), Danish naval officer
- Michael Johannes Petronius Bille (1769–1845), Danish naval officer
