= Naval Blockade of Reval (1726) =

1726 military conflict in Estonia during Great Northern War

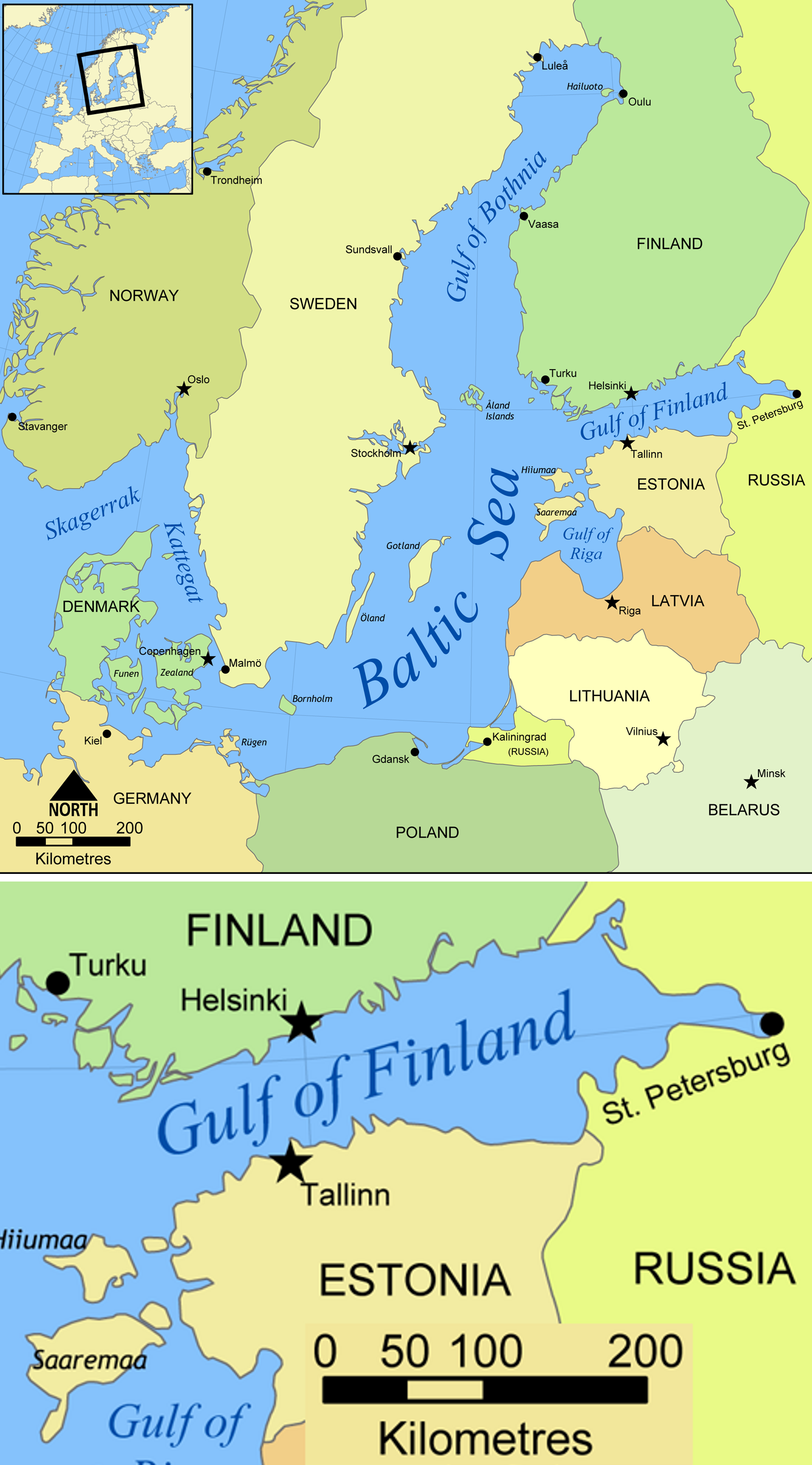

The Naval Blockade of Reval was a blockade of the Russian fleet in the harbour of Reval (today's Tallinn, in Estonia) in the summer of 1726 by a joint force of British and Danish ships.

== The British account ==
In 1725, Spain and Austria signed a series of Treaties which included terms to require the restoration Gibraltar and Minorca to Spain, and later in the year, began to negotiate with Russia. As a response, the Royal Navy despatched a fleet of 20 ships of the line to the Baltic with Admiral Charles Wager and Rear Admiral George Walton, to deter Russian intervention, while a second force of nine ships of the line under Admiral John Jennings to deter Spanish action, while a third force was sent to the Caribbean to stop Spain from sending silver from its American colonies back to Europe. (Note: According to Clowes, Jennings' fleet patrolled off Spain, while Rodger has it off Ostend.) Wager's force sailed from the Nore on 17 April 1726, joining up with a Danish squadron in May and proceeding to the Gulf of Finland. The deployment ended in the Autumn of 1726, Wager's fleet returning to England on 1 November that year.

1726

The British fleet was at Copenhagen on 23 April 1726 for two days of a diplomatic consultation on the Russian threat and cooperation. By 8 May, they were at anchor off Stockholm where the Admiral Wager delivered a copy of the letter from the British monarch written to the Czarina of Russia. The Danish fleet meanwhile, had sailed from Copenhagen on 14 May, initially for Bornholm. Arriving off Reval (Note: In contemporary papers, the British spell the name with "REVEL") (Note: Incomplete list of British ships in the squadron: Bedford, Grafton, Nassau, Northumberland, Port Mahon, Preston, Torbay (flag), Weymouth) the diplomatic letter from King George I was copied to the Russian port admiral, the original being sent onwards in HMS Port Mahon up the Gulf of Finland to Cronflot for the Czarina. (The full text of the letter is at.) The admiral also sent word to the Danish squadron off Bornholm NOT to come. (although they did eventually arrive) Throughout the tense military/naval standoff of the summer of 1726, trade by British and Swedish ships with the Russians at Petersbourg continued, such that the British could gather intelligence of the Russian preparations at the head of the Gulf of Finland. HMS Preston interviewed one such trading ship on 17 July, confirming that the Russian fleet of some eighteen sail ("possibly fifteen ships-of-the-line, and two frigates") were at Cronflot prepared for defence. One of those ships had been struck by lightning, killing five of the crew. Some 200 galleys were also reported combat-ready. The Russian Prince Menzikoff arrived at Reval from Riga on 17 July when more diplomatic activity was pursued. A letter from the British Admiral was delivered by Captain Haddock and the prince invited those British and Danish officers who were ashore to dine with him. The prince then departed for Petersbourg. On September 9 a passing ship reported that the Russian galleys at Petersburg and Cronflot had already been hauled up into winter quarters, and that the Russian men-of-war were provisioned for only five days at a time - which was to continue until the British and Danish squadrons had sailed away from Reval. The British admiral Sir Charles Wager reported on 4 October from on board the flagship that the fleet had departed the Bay of Reval with fair wind, but that all changed and there had been bad weather ever since. The British ships had kept company with the Danes as far as Gotland where the latter anchored. The British chose to continue however and eventually anchored off the island of Hanö (thirty miles west of Karlskrona) with very little damage to any of the ships.

1727

In 1727, a new British squadron commanded by Sir John Norris came to Copenhagen on 12 May as a precaution against possible aggression by Russia. Still, the reason for this deployment disappeared with the death of the Czarina later that month.

== The Danish account ==
The end of the Great Northern War meant the end of nearly 200 years Danish-Swedish rivalry for the control of the Baltic. A third naval power, Russia, with borders on the Baltic, became a player. Nearly 13 years of war had taken its toll on the navy and the Danish national treasury. In 1725 many of the Danish fleet's ships-of-the-line were laid up by order of the Danish Admiralty, as it was perceived that all danger of war had receded.

Danish ships at Reval (1726) (Note: Danish ships-of-the-line Beskiermeren, Delmenhorst, Ebenetzer, Fyen, Island, Laaland, Nordstiernen (flag), Slesvig and Wenden (of these, two did not reach Reval and three got separated from the fleet on retreat from Reval. One arrived at Reval after the blockade had begun). Danish frigates Høyenhald, Søridderen and two more names not recorded, plus lesser support ships.)

On 25 May 1726 Rear Admiral Michael Bille sailed from Copenhagen under sealed orders with a fleet of eight ships-of-the-line and four frigates. His flagship was Nordstiernen and many of his fleet were in poor condition, and leaky. On 13 June the admiral ordered ship-of-the-line Laaland back to Copenhagen as the ship was severely dilapidated. He thought this would not be the last such ship to be retired from his fleet. The Danish squadron reported arriving off Reval on 26 June, one month after the reported arrival of the British squadron. off Dars (west of Rügen) the joint fleet arrived off Reval on 26 June 1726 and instituted a blockade of the part of the Russian fleet in Reval (modern day Tallinn) from 7 July. (Note: There is no report in the Danish reference of the British instruction not to come to Reval.) Ship-of-the-line Ebenetzer had sprung a leak near the island of Gulland (modern name Gotland) and was escorted back to Denmark by the frigate Søridderen. On the approaches to Reval harbour ship-of-the-line Beskiermeren ran aground and would have become a wreck but for the timely intervention of the British admiral. She was refloated without damage. The frigates Høyenhald and Søridderen were both reported leaky, the former more so. On 14 July the ship-of-the-line Fyen arrived to join the blockading fleet. With her there was a cargo ship of provisions.

Withdrawal

Reports. dated 22 October, of the withdrawal of the blockaders were sent to Copenhagen after the flagship arrived in Danzig harbour. The combined fleet had lifted the blockade on 1 October, sailing westward with a good wind but on the 2 October storm, bad weather and contrary winds forced the Danish ships, which could not keep up with the British squadron, to seek shelter in the lee of Gulland (Gotland). Many ships were short of water, which they sought to replenish at Slyte harbour north of that island. As they left Gotland, further storms ravaged the Danish ships in the second week of October. Three ships - Beskiermeren, Island and Slesvig lost all contact with the flagship; the rest of the fleet was also scattered but managed to regain contact after two days. Fyen and Delmenhorst were leaking badly, and such was the damage to most of the ships that food could not be prepared. The reduced squadron limped into Danzig on 19 October and proceeded with making repairs. The crews were also in poor shape - scurvy and pneumonias in the four ships with the flagship had accounted for 110 dead and 130 too ill for duty. One of the dead was Andreas Henrik Stiboldt The squadron arrived back in Copenhagen on 19 November and was disbanded. The investigation by the Danish Admiralty into all the accidents and poor management of the 1726 campaign were to reverberate for the next three years.

Aftermath
1726

Immediately on the Danish fleet's return to Copenhagen, the Danish Admiralty began demanding explanations for

- the grounding of HDMS Beskiermeren
- the provisioning of the taskforce, about which there had been many complaints
- the offence and arrest of Lieutenant Wegersløff, junior lieutenant on the flagship (who misunderstood his orders regarding issuance of rations)
- why the Danish squadron became separated from the British
- the separation of some of the squadron's ships from the flagship, namely three ships-of-the-line and two frigates, without orders.
- and all else that had come to pass during the campaign.

1727

A planned taskforce of eight ships-of-the-line and five frigates and a number of smaller ships was to have left Copenhagen in June 1727 to continue observations of the Russian fleet in the Baltic in cooperation with a British squadron, but this was cancelled because of the death of the British monarch

1728 - 1729

On 20 December 1728 a commission of inquiry (Note: comprising Admiral Frants Trojel, Vice Admiral Schindel, Rear Admiral Vosbein, and Legal Advisers Dreesen and Johnsen) was appointed to investigate the case. Michael Bille was given the terms of reference of this commission in February 1729 and gave his response in defence on 14 June. The investigation was abandoned in September 1729 when Michael Bille was appointed head of the Copenhagen naval base of Holmen - a post which he held for the next six years. 215 men had died on the Reval expedition.

== The Russian account ==
Estonia and Latvia had fallen to the Russians under Peter the Great in 1710. After Tsar Peter died in 1725, he was succeeded by his wife Catherine I. Catherine supported the claims of her son-in-law, the Duke of Holstein-Gottorp, both to the throne of Sweden and to his ducal possessions in Holstein, which had remained occupied by Denmark after 1720.

1726

The Czarina was in Hamburg during May 1726 and planned to return via Riga in June, together with the Duke of Holstein.

Reports reached Stockholm on 1 June that "The Czarina's Court was under the greatest Uneasiness and Consternation at the News of the British Fleet's advancing that Way", and had immediately given Orders for reinforcing the garrisons of Wibourg, Cronflot, Reval, and Riga. Orders were given to unrig the warships in Reval, empty them of ammunition and provisions, and haul them as high in the harbour as possible which was done quickly. Three or four regiments also reinforced the garrison of Reval. Count Rabutin at the Russian court argued forcibly that no agreements should be made with the British under duress, and ensured that a high state of readiness was maintained in case of precipitate action by the British/Danish forces. A new defensive battery was built at Reval.

In addition to removing naval targets as much as possible from the Baltic harbours and reinforcing the landward defences, the Czarina sought to calm the situation by ordering the citizens of Reval to supply the foreign squadrons with all necessary provisions, which they did. She also issued a "Declaration to British Merchants" on 21 June urging them to continue trading as normal and assuring them of full Russian support despite the provocation of British warships in her waters.

The Czarina's reply, (Note: The Czarina's reply was conveyed to Sir Charles Wager by Lieutenant M Sweroff in the 56-gun Russian ship Raphael from St Petersburg) dated 19 July 1726 at St Petersburgh (sic), (full text at reference) (to His Britannic Majesty's letter) to Sir Charles Wager proclaimed her Imperial Majesty's desire to preserve the peace and tranquillity of the north. He pondered on the propriety of other monarchs questioning her armaments program. The Czarina took great exception to the arrival of the Danish squadron in the Bay of Reval, as the Danish commander had not announced his arrival in her territory to the Russian court. She questioned if the Danes wished to be considered as enemies if they did not honour the custom and equity of so reporting.

1727

Czarina Catherine died on 17 May 1727, and with her death the Russian support for the claims of Charles Frederick, Duke of Holstein-Gottorp went into abeyance. (Note: Charles Frederick's son, the future Tsar Peter III, would resurrect claims against Denmark. Charles Frederick's first cousin, Adolph Frederick, would become King of Sweden in 1751)

== The Swedish account ==
1726

On 9 June the Swedish monarch accompanied by Field Marshal Count Ducker, Lieutenant Genera Cronstedt, and some other officers inspected a new fortification at the Castle of Waxholm, on the river approaches to Stockholm. News from Reval and the Gulf of Finland was readily available in Stockholm from the numerous merchant ship movements and the normal Finnish Mail.

== Citations and references ==
=== Cited sources ===
- D. D. Aldridge (1964) The victualling of the British naval expeditions to the Baltic Sea between 1715 and 1727, Scandinavian Economic History Review, 12:1, 1-25, DOI: 10.1080/03585522.1964.10407632
- Clowes, William Laird (1898). The Royal Navy: A History From the Earliest Times to the Present: Volume III. Sampson Low, Marston and Company.
- Rodger, N. A. M. (2006). The Command of the Ocean: A Naval History of Britain, 1649–1815. Penguin. ISBN 978-0-141-02690-9.
- Royal Danish Naval Museum website - Danish ships
- The Historical Register: Containing an Impartial Relation to All Transactions Foreign and Domestick with a Chronological Diary..., Volume 11 (H Meere 1726 Europe)
- Topsøe-Jensen, T. A.; Marquard, Emil (1935a). Officerer i den dansk-norske Søetat 1660–1814 og den danske Søetat 1814–1932: Første Bind: Aalborg–Klog [Officers of the Danish-Norwegian Søetat 1660-1814 and The Danish Søetat 1814-1932 : Volume I: Aalborg–Klog] (PDF) (in Danish). Copenhagen: H. Hagerup.
- Topsøe-Jensen, T. A.; Marquard, Emil (1935b). Officerer i den dansk-norske Søetat 1660–1814 og den danske Søetat 1814–1932: Andet Bind: Kloppenborg–Ørsted [Officers of the Danish-Norwegian Søetat 1660-1814 and The Danish Søetat 1814-1932: Volume II: Kloppenborg–Ørsted] (PDF) (in Danish). Copenhagen: H. Hagerup.
