= Andreas Lous =

Royal Dano-Norwegian Navy officer

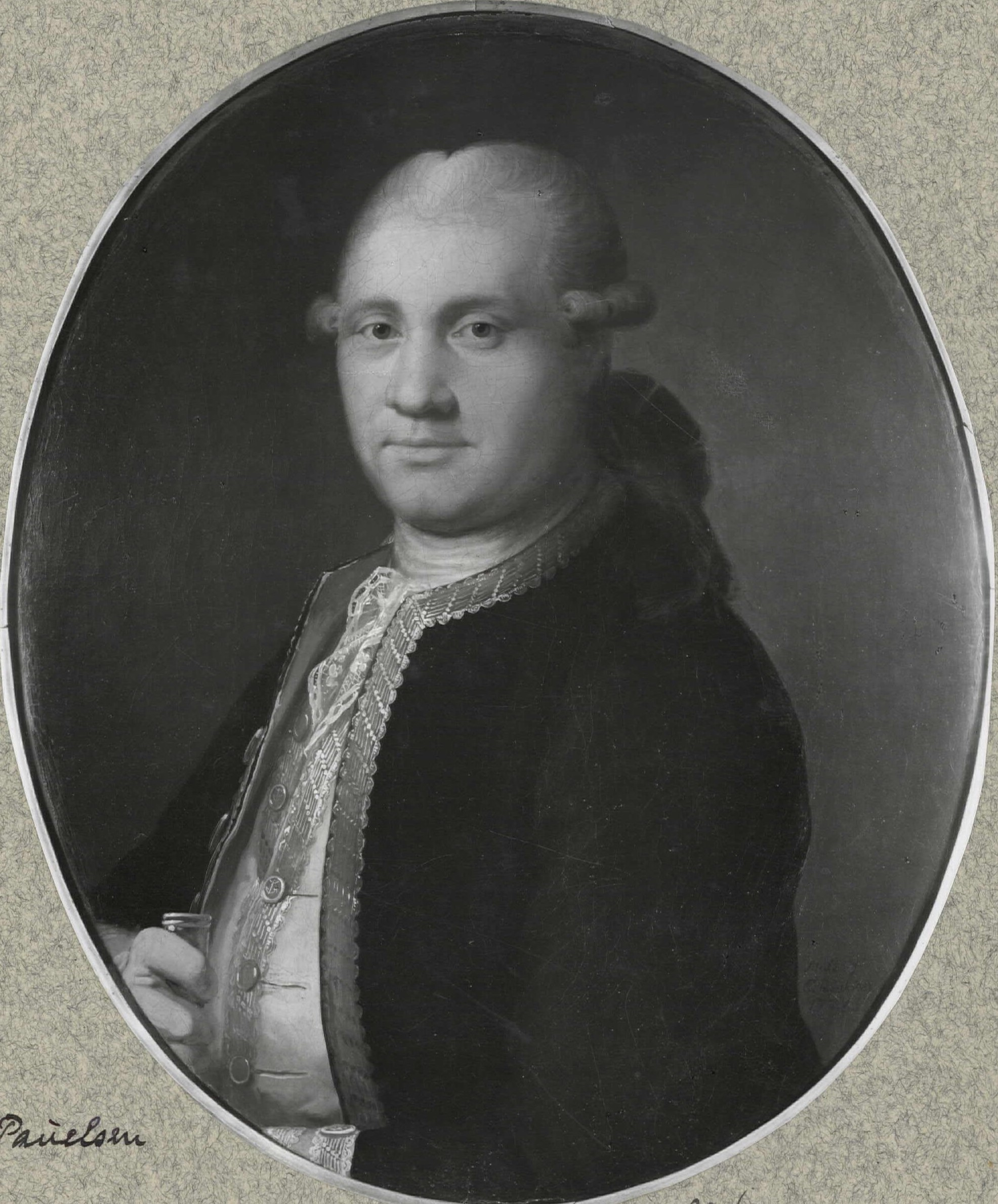
Andreas Lous painted by Erik Pauelsen.

Vice-Admiral Andreas Lous (3 October 1728 – 17 July 1797) was a Royal Dano-Norwegian Navy officer responsible for early navigational charts of Danish waters and the dredging of harbours, in addition to sea-time on various Danish warships. He was captain of the ship-of-the-line HDMS Printz Friderich when she ran aground in 1780 near Læsø and was a total loss. (Note: This ship is not to be confused with one of similar name, operated by the Danish Asiatic Company, that ran aground elsewhere in 1760.)

== Personal Details ==
Born 3 October 1728 in Copenhagen, his father Lorentz Lous was director of navigation there. Andreas married twice. His first wife was Christine Weggersløff, the daughter of a senior clergyman. He married her in 1763 and she died in 1777. His second wife was Dorothea Jensenius, the daughter of a state counsellor. Andreas died 17 July 1797.

== Career ==
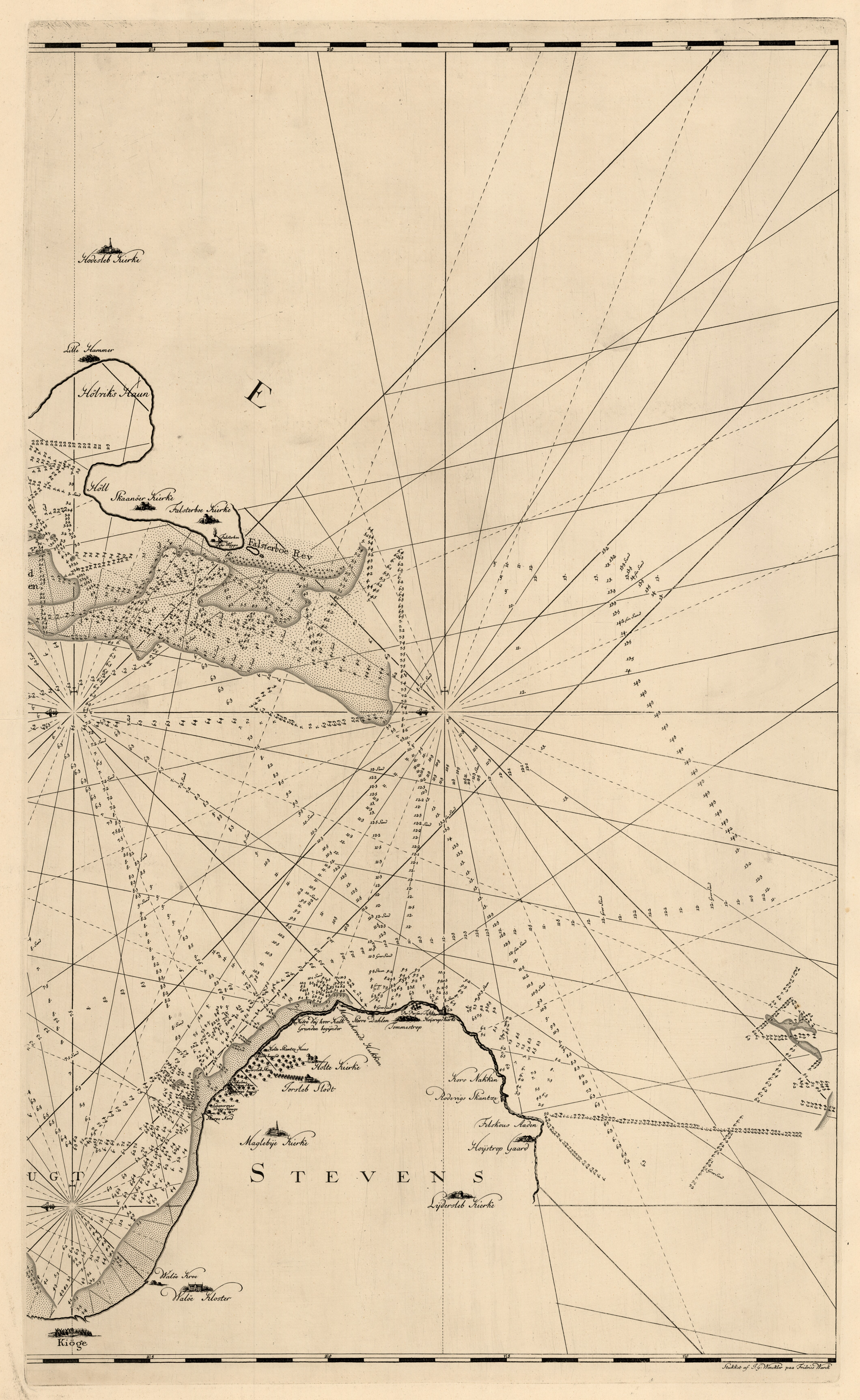
Naval chart by Lous of the waters off Kronborg, 1775.

Andreas Lous joined the Royal Dano-Norwegian Navy as a cadet in 1740. He was commissioned as a junior lieutenant in 1749 and rose steadily through the ranks until he became a counter admiral in 1790. He retired in poor health in 1796 with the rank of vice admiral.

Early in his career Lous served in the frigate Hekla, and from 1751 to 1753 he served in the frigate Docquen in the Mediterranean and at Morocco. He later sailed (1755-56) to the West Indies in Docquen as First Lieutenant under Captain H L Fisker. Later in 1756 he was given some responsibility for dock workings but was soon back at sea in Danish waters in Sejeren and again to the West Indies in Møen. Some 66% of Møen's crew died, reason unrecorded, and Lous captained her back to Denmark. For having brought Møen home in difficult circumstances, Lous was awarded a monetary bonus of 500 Rigsdollars.

In 1760 Andreas Lous was chief pilot for the waters immediately south of Copenhagen (Dragør and Dvalegrunden). While captain of the troop transport Læsø, this and several transport ships were lost in an October storm near Landskrona - although the crew was saved, his ship was a total loss. In various ships —Wenden, Jylland and Saltholm- serving largely in Øresund in the 1760s he began the survey and measurement of the Sound from Helsingør to Dragør and then further south around the island of Møen. Survey work continued, and in 1769 he was instrumental in the placing of a lighthouse at Nakkehoved at the north of the sound and two years later another lighthouse at Kronborg. Andreas Lous, together with his older brother (Note: Christian Carl Lous (1724 -1804)), was a Professor and, like his father before him, Director of Navigation at Copenhagen.) Professor C C Lous delivered a scathing critique of the then existing (1769) charts for the Kattegat and generated better charts for that area of water - charts for which he was awarded, from 1771, royalty payments that continued until his death. He was also busy charting Denmark's southern waters. Further improvements in the quality and quantity of charts and pilotage instructions would be made some twenty years later by Poul de Løvenørn.

In addition to his pilotage and seagoing duties Andreas Lous had responsibilities for docks (1756) and worked for the Danish Customs Service (1776). In 1785 he supervised the dredging of Kalundborg Harbour on the Great Belt. (Note: This was two years after Henrik Gerner had perfected his horse-powered dredging machine, which was a great improvement on the labour intensive methods used previously.) Lous also served for two years on the Helsingør Harbour Commission.

One of the four ships-of-the-line that he commanded was Printz Friderich, (Note: This ship is recorded as Prins Frederik in the Danish Wikipedia article - spelling can be awkward at times!) which ran aground and was lost on Kobbergrund in the Kattegat in September 1780. The court of inquiry into the ship's loss exonerated Captain Lous, but found against three more junior officers.
