= List of shipwrecks in September 1840 =

The list of shipwrecks in September 1840 includes ships sunk, foundered, wrecked, grounded, or otherwise lost during September 1840.

== 1 September ==
List of shipwrecks: 1 September 1840
Ship	State	Description
Lord Ravenswood	United Kingdom	The ship was wrecked on the Hendon Rock, off the coast of County Durham. Her crew were rescued.

== 2 September ==
List of shipwrecks: 2 September 1840
Ship	State	Description
Caledonia	Flag unknown	The ship was driven ashore in Mobile Bay. She was on a voyage from Mobile, Alabama, United States to Havre de Grâce, Seine-Inférieure, France. Caledonia was later refloated.
Minna	United Kingdom	The ship was in collision with a barque off Varberg, Sweden and sank. Five of her ten crew reached Anholt, Denmark in a boat. She was on a voyage from a Scottish port to Königsberg, Prussia. The barque was also abandoned, and presumed to have foundered.

== 3 September ==
List of shipwrecks: 3 September 1840
Ship	State	Description
Lee	United Kingdom	The paddle steamer was disabled in the Irish Sea due to defects with both engines. Her crew were taken off by Echo (United Kingdom). Lee was on a voyage from Cork to Liverpool, Lancashire. The tow parted in Carnarvon Bay, leaving a crew member of Echo on board. He was rescued the next day by Elizabeth (United Kingdom) before Lee foundered 10 nautical miles (19 km) north of New Quay Head, Cardiganshire.
Helens	United Kingdom	The ship ran aground and capsized at Portsmouth, Hampshire.

== 4 September ==
List of shipwrecks: 4 September 1840
Ship	State	Description
HMS Alecto	Royal Navy	The ship ran aground at Cephalonia, United States of the Ionian Islands. She was refloated with assistance from HMS Weazel (Royal Navy).
Alert	United Kingdom	The schooner was driven ashore in Algoa Bay.
Glengary	United Kingdom	The ship was abandoned in the Atlantic Ocean. Her crew were rescued by the schooner Vigilant (United Kingdom).

== 6 September ==
List of shipwrecks: 6 September 1840
Ship	State	Description
Baron Stieglitz	Russian Empire	The ship ran aground on the Kobbergrund, off Læsø, Denmark. She was on a voyage from Riga to an English port. Baron Stieglitz was refloated and resumed her voyage.

== 7 September ==
List of shipwrecks: 7 September 1840
Ship	State	Description
Katherine	United States	The ship foundered in the Atlantic Ocean. All on board were rescued by Commodore Warrington (United States), Katherine was on a voyage from New York to Saint Vincent, Virgin Islands.
Skiron	United Kingdom	The ship was wrecked on Scatarie Island, Nova Scotia, British North America. Her crew were rescued. She was on a voyage from London to Quebec City, Lower Canada, British North America.

== 8 September ==
List of shipwrecks: 8 September 1840
Ship	State	Description
Hosten	Norway	The ship was wrecked on the Estonian coast of Russia. Her crew were rescued.
St Andrew	United Kingdom	The ship was driven ashore and wrecked at Peterhead, Aberdeenshire.

== 9 September ==
List of shipwrecks: 9 September 1840
Ship	State	Description
Bruce	United Kingdom	The barque was driven ashore on Anholt, Denmark and was abandoned. She was on a voyage from Saint Petersburg, Russian Empire to Liverpool, Lancashire. Bruce later floated off and drifted into the Kattegat. She subsequently came ashore on the Swedish coast and was wrecked.
Concordia	United Kingdom	The ship departed from Sunderland, County Durham for Altona. No further trace, presumed foundered in the North Sea with the loss of all hands.
Sainte Fleur	France	The chasse-marée was run down and sunk in the English Channel off the Isle of Wight, United Kingdom by HDMS Bellona (Royal Danish Navy) with the loss of four of her eight crew. Survivors were rescued by HDMS Bellona. Sainte Fleur was on a voyage from Sunderland, County Durham, United Kingdom to Bordeaux, Gironde.
Sally	United Kingdom	The brig was driven ashore at Ayr. She was refloated on 20 September.
Wave	United Kingdom	The ship ran aground and was wrecked off the Tusket Islands, Nova Scotia, British North America. She was on a voyage from Saint John, New Brunswick, British North America to Cork.

== 11 September ==
List of shipwrecks: 11 September 1840
Ship	State	Description
Afrique	France	The ship was driven ashore in the Bay of Bengal.
Asia	France	The ship was driven ashore in the Ganges. She was on a voyage from Havre de Grâce, Seine-Inférieure to Madras, India.
Friede	Bremen	The ship sank in the Weser. She was on a voyage from Bremen to Guardbridge, Fife, United Kingdom.
Helen	United Kingdom	The ship was wrecked on Düne, Heligoland. Her crew were rescued. She was on a voyage from Newcastle upon Tyne, Northumberland to Hamburg.
Nightingale	United Kingdom	The ship was lost 40 nautical miles (74 km) east of "Brassa". Her crew were rescued.
Robert and George	United Kingdom	The ship capsized at Newcastle upon Tyne, Northumberland, damaging Conquest (United Kingdom) and sinking a keelboat. All on board survived.
Village	United States	The ship ran aground and was wrecked at St. Shott's, Newfoundland, British North America. Her crew were rescued. She was on a voyage from Boston, Massachusetts to a port in Newfoundland.

== 12 September ==
List of shipwrecks: 12 September 1840
Ship	State	Description
Helen	United Kingdom	The ship was wrecked on Heligoland. Her crew were rescued. She was on a voyage from Newcastle upon Tyne, Northumberland to Hamburg.
Intrepid	United Kingdom	The brig departed from Sierra Leone for London. No further trace, presumed foundered with the loss of all hands.

== 13 September ==
List of shipwrecks: 13 September 1840
Ship	State	Description
Brothers	United Kingdom	The ship was driven ashore near Helsingør, Denmark. She was on a voyage from Saint Petersburg, Russia to Liverpool, Lancashire.
Catherine	United Kingdom	The ship capsized in the Atlantic Ocean. She was on a voyage from New York, United States to Saint Vincent, Virgin Islands.
Falloden	United Kingdom	The ship was driven ashore and wrecked on Prince Edward Island, British North America. Her crew were rescued. She was on a voyage from London to Miramichi, New Brunswick, British North America.
Svea	Sweden	The ship was abandoned off Cape St. Vincent, Portugal. Her crew were rescued. She was on a voyage from Kalmar to Málaga, Spain.

== 14 September ==
List of shipwrecks: 14 September 1840
Ship	State	Description
Argus	United Kingdom	The ship foundered off Heligoland. She was on a voyage from Hamburg to London.
Witham	United Kingdom	The brig was driven ashore at Deal, Kent. She was on a voyage from Saint Petersburg, Russia to Bideford, Devon. Witham was refloated and put into Dover, Kent for repairs.

== 15 September ==
List of shipwrecks: 15 September 1840
Ship	State	Description
Evelina	United Kingdom	The ship ran aground in the River Foyle. She was on a voyage from Whitehaven, Cumberland to Londonderry.
Francis	United Kingdom	The ship was wrecked on Harry's Furlong, off the coast of Anglesey. Her crew were rescued. She was on a voyage from Newport, Gwent, Monmouthshire to Liverpool, Lancashire.
Liberty	United Kingdom	The ship was driven ashore at Ramsey, Isle of Man. She was on a voyage from Tarbert, Argyllshire to Ramsey.
Mary and Janet	United Kingdom	The ship foundered whilst on a voyage from Strangford, County Antrim to Ardrossan, Ayrshire. Her crew were rescued.
Sisters	United Kingdom	The sloop foundered off St. Ives, Cornwall with the loss of all hands.

== 16 September ==
List of shipwrecks: 16 September 1840
Ship	State	Description
Aimable Mere	France	The ship was wrecked on Goguelvane Point. Her crew were rescued. She was on a voyage from Rouen, Seine-Inférieure to Newport, Monmouthshire, United Kingdom.
Frolic	United Kingdom	The ship was driven ashore and severely damaged at Cardiff, Glamorgan.
HM hired armed ship Kite	Royal Navy	The hired armed transport was wrecked in the Yangtze with the loss of at least one life. Survivors were taken prisoner by the Chinese.
Maria Sophia	Norway	The ship foundered in the North Sea. Her crew were rescued by Christine (United Kingdom).
Mary	United Kingdom	The ship was wrecked on the Gore Sands, in the Bristol Channel with the loss of all hands. she was on a voyage from Newport, Monmouthshire to Bridgwater, Somerset.
Queen Victoria	United Kingdom	The ship was driven ashore on Stroma, Caithness. she was on a voyage from Shippegan, New Brunswick, British North America to Dundee, Forfarshire. Queen Victoria was refloated and resumed her voyage.
Riviere	United Kingdom	The ship capsized at Cardiff, Glamorgan and was severely damaged. She was righted the next day.
Valiant	United Kingdom	The ship was driven ashore at Newport, Monmouthshire. She was refloated on 27 September and sailed for Troon, Ayrshire.

== 17 September ==
List of shipwrecks: 17 September 1840
Ship	State	Description
Alfred	United Kingdom	The ship was driven ashore at Tourlaville, Manche, France Her crew were rescued.
Bengal	United Kingdom	The ship was driven ashore and wrecked in Table Bay. She was on a voyage from Calcutta, India to London.
Concordia	Flag unknown	The ship was driven ashore at Start Point, Devon. Her crew survived. She was on a voyage from Narva, Russia to Bordeaux, Gironde, France.

== 18 September ==
List of shipwrecks: 18 September 1840
Ship	State	Description
Dwina	United Kingdom	The ship was driven ashore north of Aberdeen.
Lucy Ann	United States	The brig ran aground on the Goodwin Sands, Kent, United Kingdom. She was on a voyage from Hull, Yorkshire, United Kingdom to New York. Lucy Ann was refloated with assistance from HMS Boxer (Royal Navy) and resumed her voyage.
Richard and Ann	United Kingdom	The ship was driven ashore between Hemsby and Winterton-on-Sea, Norfolk. Her crew were rescued. Richard and Ann was refloated on 24 September and taken into Great Yarmouth, Norfolk.

== 19 September ==
List of shipwrecks: 19 September 1840
Ship	State	Description
Catherine	United Kingdom	The barque was driven ashore and wrecked at Manilla Point, Cape Colony. Her crew were rescued. She was on a voyage from Batavia, Netherlands East Indies to London.
Henry Burness	United Kingdom	The ship was driven ashore on Dragør, Denmark. She was on a voyagte from Riga, Russia to Leith, Lothian. Henry Burness was refloated on 22 September and resumed her voyage.
Horatio	United Kingdom	The ship sprang a leak and was abandoned off Carlingford, County Louth. She was on a voyage from Troon, Ayrshire to Waterford.
Jacoba	Belgium	The ship was damaged by fire at Trieste.
Isabella	United Kingdom	The ship was wrecked on the Kentish Knock with the loss of two of the seven people on board. Her captain was reported missing in a jolly boat. Four surviving crew were rescued by a boat from the Kentish Knock Lightship ( Trinity House) and transferred to HMRC Desmond ( Board of Customs). Isabella was on a voyage from Hartlepool, County Durham to Weymouth, Dorset.
Oscar	United Kingdom	The ship was driven ashore and wrecked at Boulogne, Pas-de-Calais, France. Her crew were rescued. She was on a voyage from Newcastle upon Tyne, Northumberland to Étaples, Pas-de-Calais.
Robert and Ann	United Kingdom	The ship capsized and sank at South Shields, County Durham.
Sir David Ogilby	(United Kingdom of Great Britain and Ireland) New South Wales	The schooner was wrecked at Newcastle. She was on a voyage from Newcastle to Sydney.

== 20 September ==
List of shipwrecks: 20 September 1840
Ship	State	Description
Apollo	United States	The brig was driven ashore and wrecked at New Inlet, Long Island, New York. All four crew survived. She was on a voyage from Savannah, Georgia to an English port.
Elbing Packet	Netherlands	The ship departed from Ventava, Courland Governorate for the Meuse (Dutch: Maas). No further trace, presumed foundered with the loss of all hands.
St. Pierre	France	The ship was destroyed by fire in the Indian Ocean. Her crew were rescued.

== 21 September ==
List of shipwrecks: 21 September 1840
Ship	State	Description
Lord of the Isles	United Kingdom	The ship was wrecked on the "Isle of St. Peter" She was on a voyage from Londonderry to Quebec City, Lower Canada, British North America.
Sarah	United Kingdom	The smack struck a rock at St. John's Point, County Donegal and was wrecked. Her five crew were rescued by the Coast Guard. She was on a voyage from Swansea, Glamorgan to Greenock, Renfrewshire.

== 22 September ==
List of shipwrecks: 22 September 1840
Ship	State	Description
Gute Heinrick	Stettin	The ship collided with Voyager and foundered in the North Sea. She was on avoyage from Hull, Yorkshire, United Kingdom to Stettin.
Loyalist	United Kingdom	The barque was wrecked at St John's Point, County Donegal. Her crew survived. She was on a voyage from Saint John, New Brunswick, British North America to Sligo.

== 23 September ==
List of shipwrecks: 23 September 1840
Ship	State	Description
Ann Temple	United Kingdom	The ship was driven ashore at Sligo. She was on a voyage from Sligo to Liverpool, Lancashire. Ann Temple was refloated on 26 September and resumed her voyage.
Europe	United Kingdom	The ship ran aground in the River Mersey. She was on a voyage from Liverpool to New York, United States.
Johannes	Hamburg	The ship ran aground in the Eider. She was on a voyage from Hamburg to Riga, Russia. Johannes was refloated and put into Tønning, Duchy of Holstein.
Laurel	United Kingdom	The ship was driven ashore at Sligo. She was on a voyage from Sligo to London. Laurel was refloated on 26 September.
Olive Branch	United Kingdom	The ship was driven ashore at Sligo. She was refloated on 26 September.
Walter	United Kingdom	The ship ran aground at Aberdeen, caught fire and was severely damaged. She was on a voyage from Sunderland, County Durham to Aberdeen.

== 24 September ==
List of shipwrecks: 24 September 1840
Ship	State	Description
Golconda	United Kingdom	The East Indiaman was wrecked near south of the Penangatan Atoll, Spanish East Indies. All on board, her crew and 350 soldiers of the 37th Madras Native Infantry, were lost.
Hutton	United Kingdom	The ship was driven ashore at Fort Cumberland, Hampshire. She was on a voyage from Spithead to Langstone.

== 25 September ==
List of shipwrecks: 25 September 1840
Ship	State	Description
Bella Clara	Spain	The schooner ran aground on the Gunfleet Sand, in the North Sea off the coast of Essex, United Kingdom. She was on a voyage from Trondheim, Norway to Barcelona. Bella Clara was refloated with assistance from HMRC Desmond ( Board of Customs) and put into The Downs and was subsequently taken into Ramsgate, Kent, United Kingdom.
Mary	(United Kingdom of Great Britain and Ireland) New South Wales	The barque was wrecked at Port Fairy.

== 26 September ==
List of shipwrecks: 26 September 1840
Ship	State	Description
Mary Ann	United Kingdom	The ship struck the Hendon Rock, off the coast of County Durham, and sank. Her crew were rescued.

== 27 September ==
List of shipwrecks: 27 September 1840
Ship	State	Description
HMS Imogene	Royal Navy	The decommissioned Conway-class corvette was destroyed by fire at Plymouth, Devon.

== 28 September ==
List of shipwrecks: 28 September 1840
Ship	State	Description
Frithiof	Norway	The ship was lost 16 nautical miles (30 km) off Texel, North Holland, Netherlands. Her crew were rescued by Lady Paula (Kingdom of Hanover). Frithiof was on a voyage from Porsgrund to Jersey, Channel Islands.
James Lewis	United Kingdom	The ship was driven ashore at the Point of Sallachan, Argyllshire and was abandoned by her crew. She was later refloated. She was refloated on 14 October.
Lancier	(United Kingdom of Great Britain and Ireland) New South Wales	The ship was wrecked 12 nautical miles (22 km) from Fremantle, Swan River Colony. Her crew were rescued.
Mary	United Kingdom	The ship was driven ashore on Inch Island, County Donegal. She was on a voyage from Dublin to Ardrossan, Ayrshire. She was refloated on 1 October and taken into Troon, Ayrshire.
Pomona	United Kingdom	The barque was abandoned in the Atlantic Ocean. She was driven ashore in the Orkney Islands in late November.

== 29 September ==
List of shipwrecks: 29 September 1840
Ship	State	Description
Albion	United Kingdom	The ship was wrecked in Sheephaven Bay.
Antina	Netherlands	The ship was sighted in the Vlie whilst on a voyage from Amsterdam, North Holland to Stettin. No further trace, presumed foundered with the loss of all hands.
James Pattison	United Kingdom	The East Indiaman, a full-rigged ship, was destroyed by fire at sea. Her crew were rescued. She was on a voyage from Sydney, New South Wales to Bombay, India, Saint Helena and London.

== 30 September ==
List of shipwrecks: 30 September 1840
Ship	State	Description
Argo	United Kingdom	The ship was run down and sunk east of "Eckholm". Her crew were rescued. She was on a voyage from Hartlepool, County Durham to Riga, Russia.
Forest	United States	The ship ran aground on the Long Sand, in the North Sea off the coast of Essex, United Kingdom. She was on a voyage from Bremen to New York. Forest was refloated and towed into Harwich, Essex for repairs.
Henrietta	United Kingdom	The ship was driven ashore and wrecked at Southport, Lancashire with the loss of two of her crew. She was on a voyage from Madras, India to Liverpool, Lancashire.
Henriette	United Kingdom	The ship was wrecked on the Horse Bank, at the mouth of the River Ribble with the loss of two of her eight crew. She was on a voyage from Liverpool to Reval, Russia.
Homer	United Kingdom	The ship ran aground off Leander's Tower, Üsküdar, Ottoman Empire. She was on a voyage from Odesa to London. Homer was refloated and resumed her voyage.
James Pattison	United Kingdom	The ship was abandoned in the Atlantic Ocean off the Azores. Her crew were rescued by Norval (flag unknown).
Johns	United Kingdom	The ship was wrecked at Villequier, Seine-Inférieure, France. Her crew were rescued. She was on a voyage from Sunderland, County Durham to Rouen, Seine-Inférieure.

== Unknown date ==
List of shipwrecks: Unknown date in September 1840
Ship	State	Description
Casket	United Kingdom	The ship was driven ashore on the coast of Cuba. She was on a voyage from Jamaica to the Clyde. Casket was later refloated and taken into Key West, Florida Territory.
Clara and Emma	United Kingdom	The barque was driven ashore in Lower Canada, British North America before 12 September and caught fire. She was subsequently taken into Quebec City for repairs.
Forrester	United States	The schooner ran aground on the Longsand, in the North Sea off the coast of Essex. She was refloated with assistance from HMRC Scout ( Board of Customs) and the cruiser Flying Fish (United Kingdom).
Harry Bewis	United Kingdom	The ship was abandoned in the North Sea before 1 October. She was on a voyage from Riga, Russia to Leith, Lothian. Harry Bewis was towed into Calais, France on 13 October.
Hope	United Kingdom	The ship was wrecked near Bayonne, Basses-Pyrénées, France. She was on a voyage from a Spanish port to Bristol, Gloucestershire.
July	United Kingdom	The ship foundered in the Atlantic Ocean before 2 September.
Kara	United Kingdom	The ship was driven ashore at Messina, Sicily. She was on a voyage from London to Messina. Kara was later refloated and taken into Messina.
Prince Albert	(United Kingdom of Great Britain and Ireland) New South Wales	The cutter was wrecked between Point Nepean and Cape Shank with the loss of all four crew.
Quebec	United Kingdom	The ship ran aground on the Manichougan Shoals. She was later refloated and put back to New York, United States.
United Kingdom	United Kingdom	The ship was driven ashore and damaged in Lower Canada before 12 September. She was later refloated and taken into the Cul de Sac.
