= Frederik Michael Krabbe =

Danish autobiographer

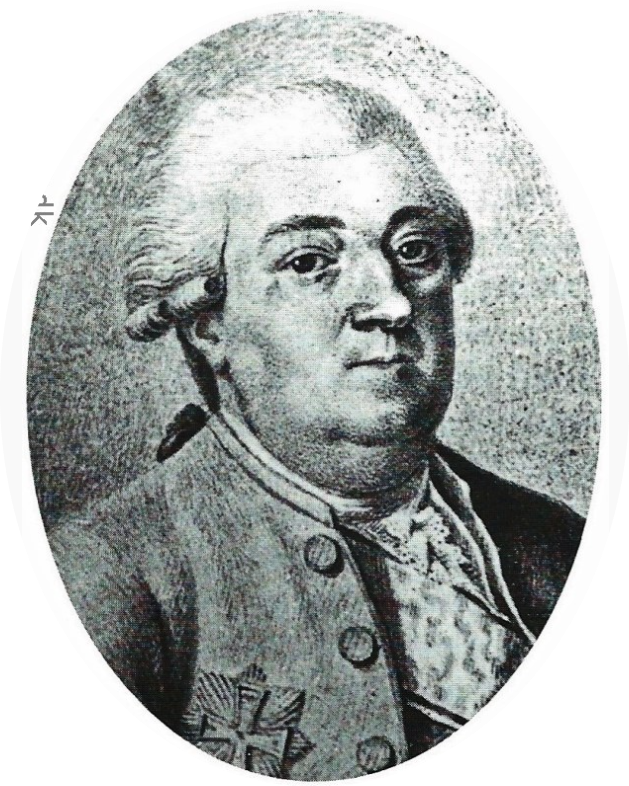

Fabriksmester of Orlægsværftet
- In office 7 September 1758 – 6 July 1772
- Monarchs: Frederick V (until 1766), Christian VII
- Preceded by: Diderich de Thurah
- Succeeded by: Henrik Gerner

Personal details
- Born: 28 May 1725 Esrum, Denmark
- Died: 25 October 1796 (aged 71) Skælskør, Denmark

Frederik Michael Krabbe (28 May 1725 – 25 October 1796) was a Danish naval officer and master shipbuilder (fabrikmester).

== Personal ==
Born at Esrum, some 22 miles north of Copenhagen, on 28 May 1725, Krabbe was the son of a regimental quartermaster. His first marriage, to Cæcilie Andrea Bille (whose father was rear admiral Daniel Ernst Bille)at the naval church at Holmen, established links with two important Danish naval families - the Billes and the Stibolts through his bride's parentage. He had three marriages altogether (1759, 1766 and 1772) which all ended with his wives' deaths. His second wife was Christiane Charlotte Charisius(1738-1771), daughter of Constantin Augustus Charisius of Constantinborg and Kirsten baronesse Gyldenkrone. His third wife was Edel Margrethe Sehested (1749-1827), daughter of Anders Sehested of Stamhuset BroholmWibeke Marie von Pultz.

== Career ==
He joined the navy in 1741 as a very junior cadet, and in 1746 saw service in Sydermanland which was with the squadron off Algiers. Promoted to junior Lieutenant in 1749, he was granted, in 1750, leave of six months to stay at Bornholm. In September of that year he started as an apprentice at the Construction Commission and embarked two years later together with Lieutenant F. C. Kaas on a study tour to Britain, France and Holland to learn their methods of shipbuilding. This tour took four years and included England, Brest, Rochefort, Toulon, Italy, Pisa, Venice, Naples, Marseilles and Amsterdam. He returned in November 1756 and was appointed a full member of the Construction Commission.
In a very short time he became responsible, together with Lt. Kaas, for the building of a chebek (Note: n.b. Danish spelling.) to an Italian design, and the joint design of the frigate Christianborg. When Kaas was posted to the ship-of-the-line Neptunus, Krabbe alone supervised the building of this frigate. Late in 1757, using the best of French frigates as his inspiration, Krabbe produced designs for a new frigate which resulted in two new ships being built - Søe Ridderen (1758) and Langeland (1758).
In September 1758 Krabbe was officially appointed as Fabrikmester, master shipbuilder to the Royal Danish Navy and his first ship-of-the-line was designed. In 1761 he was appointed as an advisor to the committee for the construction of Helsingør harbor. In 1768 he reported on the condition of the harbour at Christiansø, with recommendations for improvements. In July 1772 he retired as fabrikmester.

== Krabbe's ships ==
In 1766 complaints about the cost of Krabbe-designed ships were made by Dannesjold-Samsøe of the Construction Committee. Although the ships were broader than earlier designs, their lower deck batteries were no more efficient, and more costly for a 50 gun ship than the proven 60-gun ships previously built.
The following ships are attributed to Krabbe

Ships-of-the-line

- Jylland (1760)
- Mars (1762)
- Prindcesse Sophia Magdalena (1763)
- Prindsesse Wilhelmine Caroline (1764)
- Printz Friderich (1764)
- Norske Løve (1765)
- Dronning Caroline Mathilde (1766) renamed Øresund
- Christian den Syvende (1767)
- Dronningen (1768) renamed Den Ptrægtige
- Holsteen (1772)
- Wagrien (1773)

Frigates

- Christiansborg (1758)
- Langeland (1758)
- Søe Ridderne (1758)
- Falster (1760)
- Havfruen (1760)
- Alsen (1763)
- Tranqvebar (1762)
- Christiansøe (1766)
- Samsøe (1770)
- Perlen (1773)
- Christiania (1774)
- Cronborg (1776)
- Færøe (1766)
- and one unnamed frigate designed 1770.

Lesser ships.

== Citations ==
- Project Runeberg:C With on Frederik Christian Kaas in Danish Biographical Lexikon Vol 9 page 55
- T. A. Topsøe-Jensen og Emil Marquard (1935) “Officerer i den dansk-norske Søetat 1660-1814 og den danske Søetat 1814-1932“ (Danish Naval Officers)
- Royal Danish Naval Museum website for Database > Avancerede > Set Konstructør to Krabbe > Søg (This works only if the language is set to Danish)
- Royal Danish Naval Museum - List of Danish Warships
- Royal Danish Naval Museum - Skibregister for individual ships record cards where they exist.
