= HDMS Den Prægtige =

Danish naval vessel

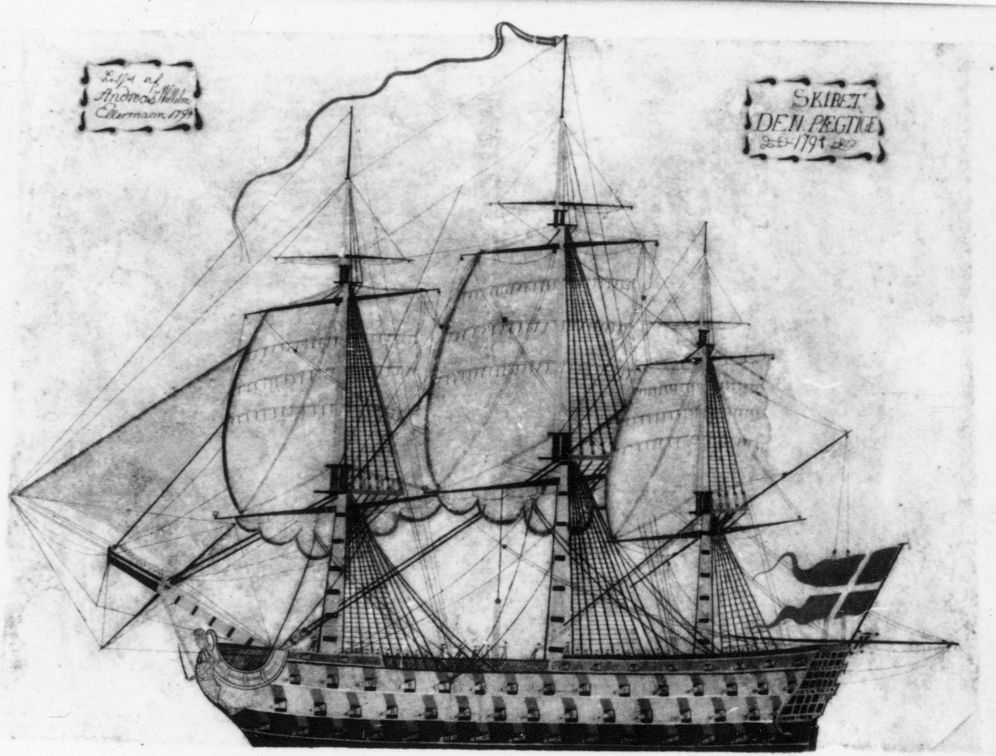

History
- Name: Dronningen
- Builder: Frederik Michael Krabbe, Nyholm, Copenhagen
- Laid down: 15 March 1768
- Launched: 22 November 1768
- Renamed: Den Prægtige (29 July 1772)

General characteristics
- Type: Ship of the line
- Length: 180 ft (55 m)
- Beam: 47 ft (14 m)
- Sail plan: Full-rigged ship
- Complement: 818
- Armament: 80 × 37-pounder guns

HDMS Den Prægtige (prior to 20 July 1772. HDMS Dronningen) was a ship of the line of the Royal Dano-Norwegian Navy, launched in 1768.

== Construction and design ==
Sronningen was constructed at Nyholm Dockyard to a design by Frederik Michael Krabbe. She was laid down on 15 March 1768, launched on 22 November 1768 and the construction was completed in May 1772.

Dronningen was 180 ft (55 m) long with a beam of 47 ft (14 m) and a draught of 20 ft (6.1 m). Her complement was 818 men. Her armament was 80 36-pounder guns.

== Career ==
On 20 July 1772, following Christian VII's divorce from Queen Caroline Matilda, Dronnibngen was renamed Den Prægtige.

In 1794, she was under the command of Johan Peter Wleugel. In 1789, she was under the command of Steen Andersen Bille, flag captain to Conrad von Schindel, as part of an escadre.

She was decommissioned in 1799.
