= Prussian Naval Academy =

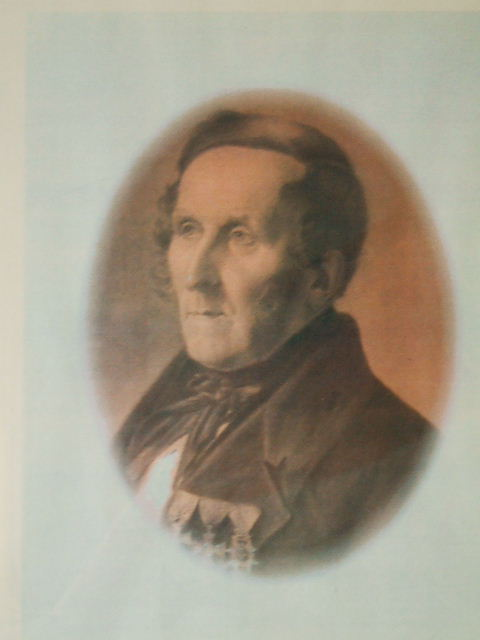
Captain Johann Diedrich Longé.

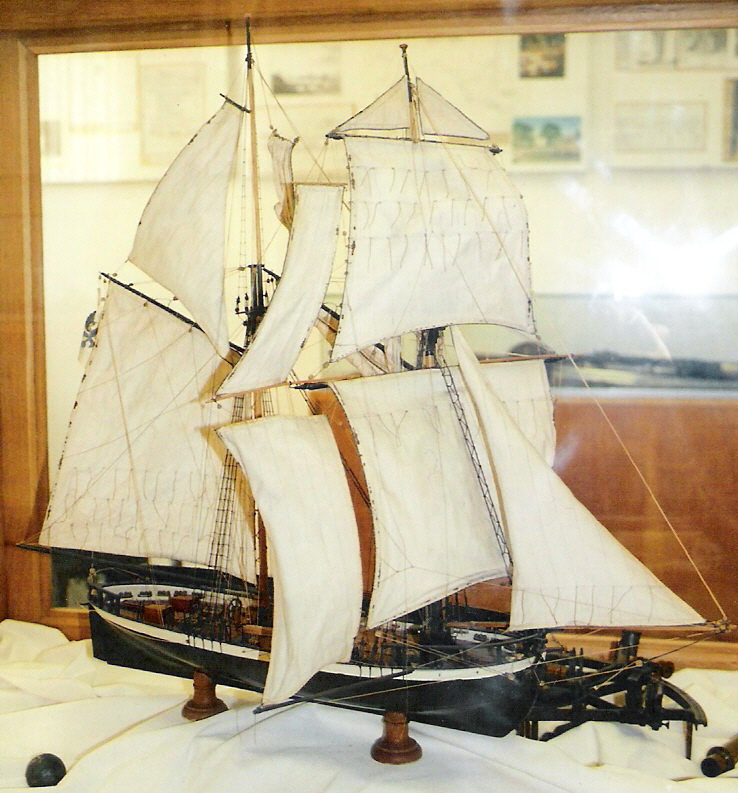
Model of Longé's Schooner Stralsund in the Dänholm Naval Museum, at Strelasund just east of Stralsund.

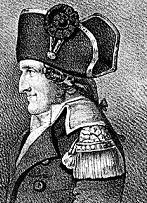
Rear Admiral Michael Bille

The Prussian Naval Academy was the naval academy of the Prussian Navy.

== Foundation ==
The training of officers for the Prussian Navy started with the foundation of the Navigationsschulen in Danzig in 1817, although there were other similar schools in the first half of the nineteenth century at Memel, Königsberg, Stettin and Stralsund.

Under the leadership of King Wilhelm III, and the Minister of Finance Hans von Bülow, the Prussian Cabinet ordered on 20 June 1817 the creation of a navigation school for the building and training of officers for seagoing vessels. This first Prussian school of this kind started in Danzig (today Gdansk in Poland) at the St. Jacob Church, where a tower was built as an observatory.

The maintenance of the school came from the revenues of the port of Danzig, and it was supervised by a group of merchants, ship owners and ship captains (such as Johann Diedrich Longé) under the city senate.

The first director was a Dr. Tobiesen, who proved capable but only stayed a few years. Already in the first year there were 40 students who mainly studied navigation but also did occasional "military maneuvers" on the schooner of war Stralsund - under Captain Longé.

== Michael Bille ==
To succeed Tobiesen a director was sought from one of the neighboring countries with a more developed naval tradition than Prussia. An excellent candidate was found in nearby Denmark: Michael Bille (Miohaei John Petroniue Bille).

Michael Bille was from a noble family which had produced and would produce Danish admirals. He served actively in the Napoleonic Wars and then was pilot inspector in Elsinore. He taught mathematics and astronomy at the Danish Naval School (Dansk Søværnets Officersskole).

In 1821 he began a very fruitful career as director of the Navigationsschule in Danzig. After three years he moved the school into a building that lay outside Danzig at the mouth of the Radaune River because the St. Jacob Church was inadequate. The school was then assigned to the war schooner Stralsund commanded by Longé. The number of students increased from 40 in 1827 to 115-120 in 1831.

From 1825 the school also had the "lagoon" gunboat Danzig which was driven by sails and paddles. Bille and the two vessels were under the authority of the Ministry of War in Berlin. This can be seen as the beginning of the modern Prussian Navy.

Bille resigned from Prussian service on 3 May 1838 because he had become a Rear Admiral in the Danish Navy. He had performed excellently and was well remembered: "A better leader for this branch of navigation at that time would have been difficult can be found. The Danish origin was not an obstacle to him, his official duties with pleasure and zeal." In 1840 he published a book on navigation Tankar om och i navigationen.
