= Manuela Medina =

Mexican woman soldier (1780–1822)

María Manuela Molina
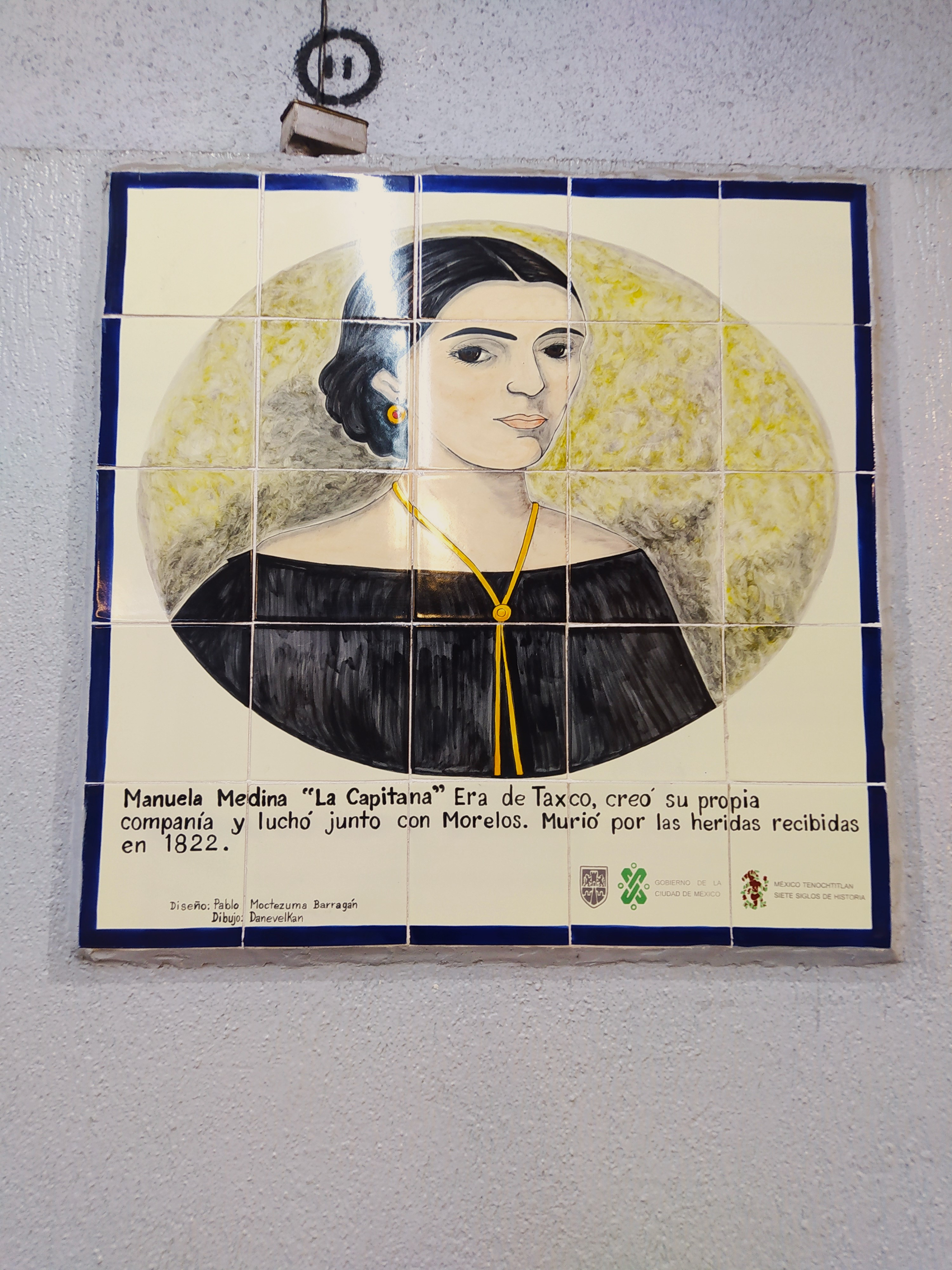
- Mosaic of Manuela Medina in Mexico City
- Born: 1780; Taxco
- Died: 2 March 1822 (aged 42); Texcoco, State of Mexico
- Other name: La Capitana
- Occupation: Insurgent

Manuela Medina (1780- 2 March 1822) was a woman who fought on the forefront of combat during the Mexican War of Independence. She was a Native American from Texcoco. Medina served under the patriot leader and priest José María Morelos initially as a recruiter but later leading troops into battle. She fought in actions throughout 1812 and 1813 and continued to fight even after the capture and execution of Morelos. She was wounded in action in 1820; paralysed, she eventually died of these wounds in 1822.

== Biography ==
Manuela Medina, also known as Maria Manuela Molina, was a Native American from Texcoco who was born in 1780. She served in the Mexican War of Independence under the command of the former priest José María Morelos. She initially served as a recruiter to the patriot cause before becoming an officer.

Medina was the first captain of the rebel forces to lead her troops into royalist fire and succeeded against the royalist soldiers. She participated in the occupation of Acapulco and the Siege of Cuautla. She also saw action at Guerrero, Michoacan, Tixtla and in Spring 1812 fought at Citlalli, Tehuacan, Orizaba and Oaxaca. On 13 April 1813 she participated in the second battle of Acapulco and went on to serve ain the Battle of San Diego on 20 August. Medina was at Valladolid from winter 1813 and served in the 24 February 1814 action at Rancho de las Animas. She continued to serve after Morelos was captured in November 1815 and executed by the Spanish. She was wounded in the back and stomach by lances in September 1820 and was paralysed. Medina eventually died of these wounds on 2 March 1822 at the age of 42.

== Legacy ==
Medina is mentioned in Mexican elementary school textbooks issued by the Secretariat of Education (SEP) as a heroine of the independence movement.
