= Elizabeth Butchill =

Elizabeth Butchill (ca. 1758–1780) was an English woman who was tried and executed for the murder of her illegitimate new-born child.

== Life ==
Little of Butchill's early life is known except that she came from Saffron Walden, Essex. In about 1777, Butchill—unmarried—moved to Cambridge to live with her uncle and aunt, William and Esther Hall. Like her aunt, she worked as a college bed maker at Trinity College. On 6 January 1780 Butchill spent the day in bed groaning and complaining of colic. She was tended to by her aunt in the morning and later in the evening. On 7 January the body of a new-born girl was found in the river near the Halls' home on the grounds of the college. At an inquest, the coroner—Mr Bond—determined that the baby had died of a fractured skull. William Hall believed that the infant was Butchill's and arranged for a surgeon to examine her. On examination, she admitted that she had given birth to the baby. She said that the child was born alive and that she had thrown her down a "necessary" (toilet) into the river and buried the placenta.

Butchill was charged by the coroner's jury with wilful murder. Unusually for an unmarried woman, she was not charged as the mother, that is, under the Concealment of Birth of Bastards Act 1623 (21 Jas. 1. c. 27). Under this act, it was a capital offence for a mother to conceal the birth of a child. Butchill was simply tried for murder, and convicted. Despite pleading for mercy, she was sentenced to death and her body was to be anatomized. She was executed on 17 March 1780 at Cambridge. According to The Newgate Calendar, on the day of her death, she was "firm, resigned, and exemplary ... reconciled to her fate".
