= Daniel Ernst Bille =

Royal Dano-Norwegian Navy officer

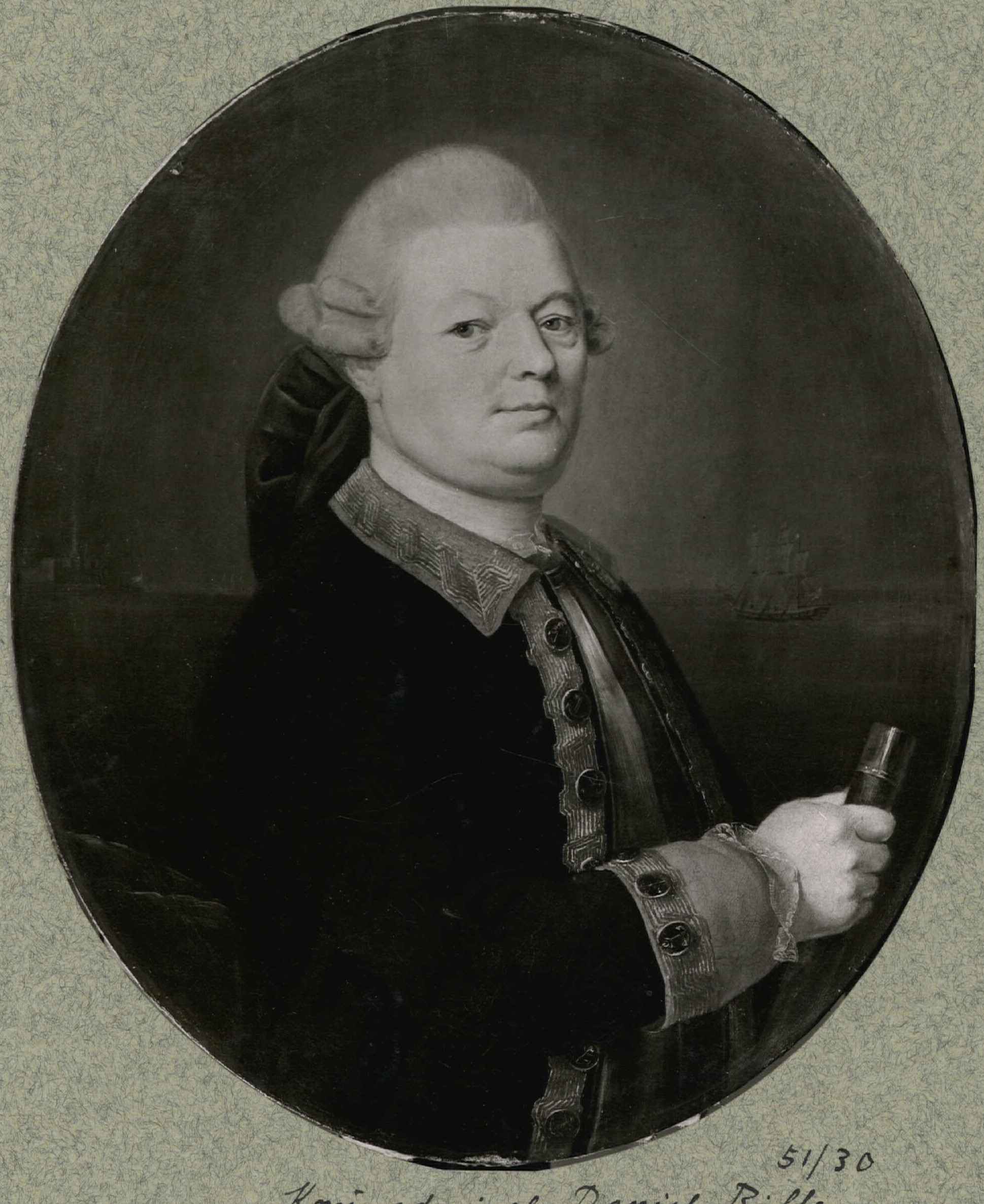
- Daniel Bille by Andreas Brünniche.
- Born: Daniel Ernst Bille; 7 April 1711
- Died: 25 February 1790 (aged 78); Copenhagen
- Occupation: Naval officer
- Spouse: Johanne Sophie Amale Stibolt
- Children: 6, including Steen
- Relatives: nephew of Michael Bille (1680-1756), father-in-law to Frederik Michael Krabbe

Counter-Admiral Daniel Ernst Bille (7 April 1711 – 25 February 1790) was a Royal Dano-Norwegian Navy officer.

== Personal ==
Bille was born on 7 April 1711, the son of captain Just Bille (Note: a member of the junior line of the Danish noble family - see da: Bille (adelsslægt)) and Catherine Maule. He was a nephew of admiral Michel Bille.

On 8 July 1738, he was married in the naval church in Copenhagen to Johanne Sophie Amalie Stibolt (of the Christiansø Stibolt family) They lived in a now demolished building at Dronningens Tværgade No. 340 (later Dronningens Tværgade 40, now part of Prinsessegården) at the time of the 1787 census. They lived there with their daughters Vathrine and Charlotte Bille, their sons Just and Steen Andersen Bille, his wife's niece, Sophie Bille, and the widow, Mette Anders Datter Munch. His entire adult life was a period of relative peace for Denmark.

== Career ==
As a naval cadet, Bille was given permission to sail with the Danish Asiatic Company ship Cronprintzen to Tranquebar on the Coromandel Coast, a voyage that lasted two years and during which he was commissioned as a junior lieutenant. In 1735, he sailed again with the Asiatic company, this time to China returning in 1738.

As a senior lieutenant (from early 1740) he held the post of recruitment officer for Assens District on the island of Funen. In 1746, he sailed with the ship-of-the-line Delmenhorst to Algeria, being promoted further on his return in October that year.

In 1755, seeking a station close to his large family in Nyborg, he was granted this as captain of the snow Æro which was the guard ship for the Great Belt, and the following year as captain of the frigate Christiansø off Copenhagen.

Bille captained the frigate Bornholm in the fleet during 1758 before moving to the ship-of-the-line Delmenhorst in 1759 and 1760, employed in convoy duties to Lisbon and Marseille which included the delivery of hunting falcons to the king of Portugal. In 1761, he was an official observer on the sea trials of the new frigate Falster (designed and built by his son-in-law Frederik Michael Krabbe) and in the following years acted as assessor in various courts martial. In March 1766, he refused to consider repaying a debt which his long dead father, Just Bille, had incurred to the Bornholm Infantry Regiment.

He commanded, in 1769, the ship-of-the-line Norske Løve, the best sailing ship in Admiral le Sage de Fontenay’s squadron. Newly promoted to commodore, he spent most of 1769 in charge of the refitting and commissioning of some ships that were laid up in Norway. With Rear Admiral rank from 1784, he held responsibility for the naval defence of Copenhagen.

== Death ==
Daniel Bille died on 25 February 1790, aged 78, in Copenhagen and is buried in the naval cemetery of Holmen.

== Citations ==
- (in Danish)Project Runeberg: C With on Daniel Ernst Bille in Dansk Biografisk Lexikon Vol 2 page 223
- (in Danish)T. A. Topsøe-Jensen og Emil Marquard (1935) “Officerer i den dansk-norske Søetat 1660–1814 og den danske Søetat 1814–1932" (Danish Naval Officers). Two volumes Volume 1 and Volume 2.
- Royal Danish Naval Museum List of Danish Ships
