= Sofia Hjärne =

Finnish baroness, writer and salon holder (1780–1860)

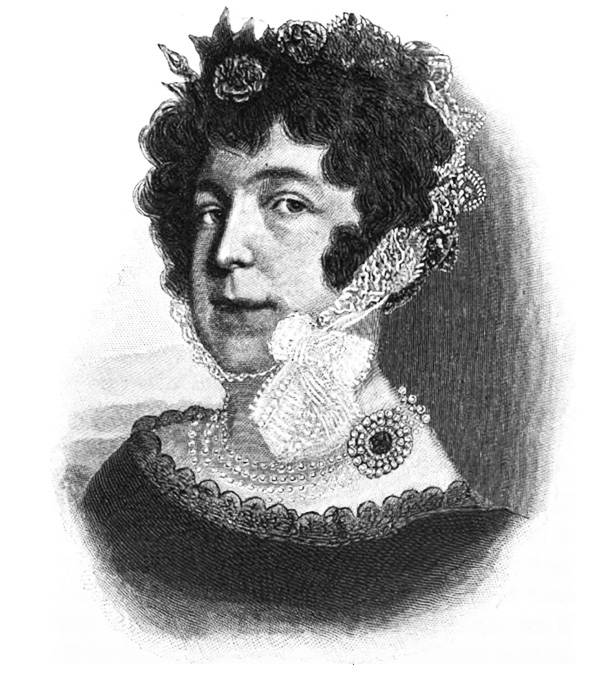
Drawing of Gustafva Sofia Hjärne

Gustafva Sofia Hjärne (4 July 1780 – 6 March 1860), was a Finnish baroness, writer and salon holder.

== Biography ==
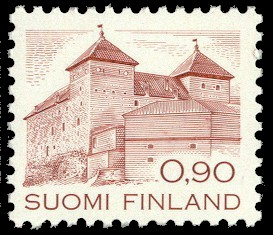
Häme Castle in Hämeenlinna

Gustafva Sofia Rosenborg was born in Sweden, the daughter of Anders Rosenborg and Christina Charlotta Funck. In 1801 Sofia Rosenborg married Captain Gustaf Hjärne. Her husband was later the governor in Hämeenlinna and was elected a member of the Senate of Finland. They were the parents of four children: Beata Sofia Johanna (b. 1802), Gustaf Adolf (b. 1805), Alexandra (b. 1821) and Hedvig (b. 1821).

Sofia Hjärne was the central figure in one of Finland's earliest literary salons. According to certain sources, during the Finnish War, Sofia Hjärne was instrumental in averting a battle by achieving the peaceful handover of the stronghold of Sveaborg near Helsinki to Russians forces during the Siege of Sveaborg in early 1808.

She translated two plays and wrote poems for almanacs and newspapers anonymously. In 1831, she published the Swedish language novel Tavastehus slott, en romans från Birger Jarls af Bjelbo tidehvarf (Helsinki 1837). The romantic novel centered on the medieval Häme Castle (Finnish: Hämeen linna; Swedish: Tavastehus slott). Based on local legend, it featured the sister of Swedish statesman Birger Jarl and her unhappy love for a Finnish chieftain.
