= Bendix Lasson Bille =

- Born: 23 November 1723
- Died: 5 October 1784 (aged 60); Copenhagen
- Burial place: Copenhagen
- Relatives: father Admiral Michael Bille, nephew Counter-Admiral Michael Johannes Petronius Bille
- Military career
- Allegiance: Denmark
- Branch: Royal Danish Navy
- Service years: 1733–1784
- Rank: Counter-Admiral
- Conflicts: Dano–Algerian War

Counter-Admiral Bendix Lasson Bille (23 November 1723 – 5 October 1784) was a Royal Dano-Norwegian Navy officer.

== Personal ==
Born on 23 November 1723, the son of Admiral Michael Bille and Karen Lasson, Bille married the widow of a medical doctor in Glückstadt while on extended leave there in 1762 but separated three years later. The marriage was childless.

== Career ==
Starting as a cadet in 1733, Bille was commissioned as a junior lieutenant in 1741. He served on the ship-of-the-line Oldenborg in the Danish squadron off Algiers in 1746 (Note: In a show of strength, and eventual bombardment of Algiers, to force the Bey of Algiers into a peace treaty. The squadron was commanded by Count Ulrich Adolf Danneskiold-Samsøe) and three years later as a senior lieutenant in command of the galley Achilles. During a year as recruitment officer in Helsingør, he was further promoted in August 1754 and sailed as second-in-command of the ship-of-the-line Ditmarsken in 1756. Promoted to captain in 1758, Bille was in command of the Turensen-designed frigate Hvide Ørn (1753) convoying to and from the Danish West Indies. A series of reports sent by him to Copenhagen dealt with the Spanish seizure and plundering of a smaller royal ship which had called at Puerto Rico for fresh water. (Note: Bille’s second-in-command from Hvide Ørn, captain-lieutenant Frederik Grodtschilling, was on board this royal barque – but as the ship had been carrying contraband, compensation could not be pursued! The losses were repaid by the Danish monarch.) The commissariat noted that captain Bille was a good manager of his ship's expenses.
In 1762 he captained the frigate Falster and was head of naval supplies at Glückstadt. He was further promoted in 1767 and in command of the ship-of-the-line Prinsesse Wilhelmine Caroline in 1771 when this ship was sent to reinforce the Danish squadron (under Counter-Admiral Hooglant (Note: See Danish wikipedia da:Simon Hooglant)) in the Mediterranean during the Danish–Algerian War. On 30 January 1772 in Gibraltar harbour during a severe winter storm his ship dragged its anchor, colliding with the bow of HMS Trident before running aground. The ship was warped off when the storm subsided, with only minor damage.

In 1774 and 1775 Bille was in command of the ships laid up but ready for active service in Trosvig, Fredrikstad from where he delivered ship-of-the-line Neptunus to Copenhagen. In December 1775. He was promoted to the rank of commodore and posted to Trondheim as head of recruitment and chief pilot for Trondheim district, positions he held until his death.

In 1781 Bille achieved flag rank as counter admiral.

== Death ==
Bille died in Frederik's hospital in Copenhagen on 5 October 1784. He is buried near the entrance to the chapel of the Church of Holmen

== Citations ==
- (in Danish) Project Runeberg: C With on Bendix Lasson Bille in Danish Biographical Lexicon Vol 2 page 211
- (in Danish) T. A. Topsøe-Jensen og Emil Marquard (1935) “Officerer i den dansk-norske Søetat 1660-1814 og den danske Søetat 1814-1932“. Two volumes. Downloadable at Volume 1 and Volume 2
