= James Pattison (1828 ship) =

English merchant, migrant, and convict sailing ship

History

United Kingdom
- Name: James Pattison
- Owner: Thomas Ward (1828)
- Builder: Adam Gordon, Deptford
- Launched: 28 April 1828
- Fate: Burnt 1840

General characteristics
- Tons burthen: 513, or 5134/94 (bm)
- Length: 121 ft 9 in (37.1 m)
- Beam: 30 ft 7 in (9.3 m)
- Propulsion: Sail

James Pattison was a merchant sailing ship built in 1828, upon the River Thames, England. She made one voyage for the British East India Company (EIC), and two transporting convicts to New South Wales. She also made several voyages carrying immigrants. She burnt to the waterline after her cargo ignited en route from Sydney to England in 1840.

== Career ==
EIC voyage (1828–1829): Captain Joseph Grote sailed from Portsmouth on 20 June 1828, bound for Bengal. James Pattison reached Calcutta on 25 November. Homeward bound, she was at Vizagapatam on 26 January 1829, and Madras on 5 February. She reached the Cape of Good Hope on 12 April, and arrived at The Downs on 16 June.

Emigrant voyage: On 28 April 1835, James Pattison carried 238 free women emigrating from Ireland to New South Wales under the auspices of the Committee for Promoting the Emigration of Single Women (the London Emigration Commission). She arrived at Port Jackson on 2 February 1836. A year later, some 82 remained without employment.

First convict voyage (1829–1830): Under the command of Joseph Grote and surgeon James Gilchrist, she sailed from Dublin, Ireland on 2 October 1829, and arrived at Port Jackson, Australia on 20 January 1830. She had embarked 200 male convicts; one convict died on the voyage. James Pattison sailed from Port Jackson on 13 March 1830, with passengers and cargo for Madras and Bengal, via Hobart Town.

James Pattison transported Governor Sir James Stirling, arriving at the Swan River Colony on 19 August 1834.

Second convict voyage (1837): James Pattison was under the command of James Cromarty and surgeon Thomas Robertson. She sailed from Portsmouth, England on 16 July 1837, and arrived at Port Jackson on 25 October. She had embarked 270 male convicts, none of whom died on the voyage.

Emigrant voyages: James Pattison, Cromarty, master, arrived in Port Jackson from England on 11 December 1838, with 300 emigrants in good health. There were five births and 11 deaths among the children. During the voyage, James Pattison at one point became becalmed and it was necessary for her to sail round Van Dieman's Land rather than through the Bass Strait.

James Pattison sailed from Gravesend on 8 November 1839, and arrived at Port Jackson in February 1840, with 187 immigrants.

After she departed Sydney she sailed to Bombay, where she loaded a cargo of cotton. She left Bombay 27 June 1840.

== Fate ==
On 29 September, the crew detected smoke and found that the cargo had spontaneously ignited. As the flames reached her rigging the crew abandoned ship in the Atlantic on 30 September, off the Azores. Norval, which was passing on her way to Leghorn, saved the crew and landed them in Lisbon.
