= Johann Diedrich Longé =

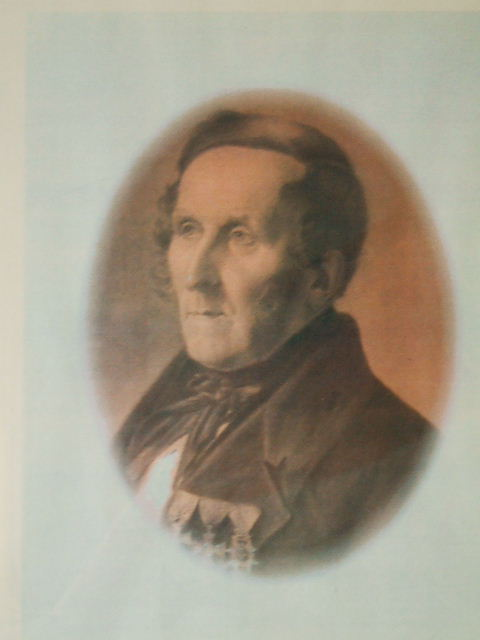
Johann Diedrich Longé

Johann Diedrich Longé (5 December 1779; 10 May 1863, Stralsund, Mecklenburg, Germany) was a Swedish and Prussian naval officer. He was instrumental in building the Prussian Navy.

Longé was born in what was then Swedish Finland. In 1794 he joined an infantry regiment and in 1799 moved to the navy. On 23 May 1801 he passed the examination as a naval officer served until 1805 in the Swedish Navy. In 1805 he was exempted from service in order to serve with English merchant and naval ships. During this period he was a prisoner of war of both Russia and France.

Longé was serving in the Swedish navy in Swedish Pomerania when that province was transferred to Prussia on 15 August 1815. He then transferred from the Swedish Navy to the Prussian Navy. The Prussian king confirmed the transfer on 2 April 1816 and appointed him captain. He then was deployed in Stralsund, which was a fortress at this time.

In Stralsund Longé prompted the construction of the schooner Stralsund. This may be considered the birth of the Prussian Navy. He was also involved in the formation of the first Prussian Naval Academy, the Navigationsschule, opened in Danzig in 1817. As commander of the Stralsund he took the students on training cruises.

On 10 July 1820 he submitted a plan which called for the gradual development of the Prussian navy. On 17 August 1827 he became chairman Royal naval depot on Dänholm island at Stralsund. He was involved with the development of a fleet plan in 1836. In 1848 he became chairman of the Marine Committee in Stralsund, prompting the construction of the rowing gunboat Strela-Sund. After the Prussian king rejected his request for reactivation he resigned from the Marine Committee.

He died on 10 May 1863 and was buried at Stralsund.
