= HDMS Printz Friderich (1764) =

Danish ship-of-the-line (1764-1780)

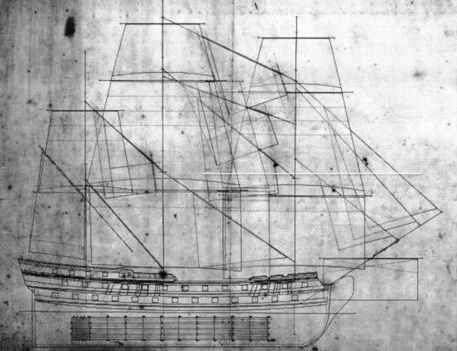
- Original plans of the Printz Friederich

History

Kingdom of Denmark
- Name: HDMS Printz Friderich
- Builder: F. M. Krabbe, Nyeholm, Copenhagen
- Laid down: 1761
- Launched: 1764
- Fate: Wrecked 29 September 1780

General characteristics
- Complement: 667
- Armament: 70 guns

HDMS Printz Friderich was a ship-of-the-line launched in 1764, to a design by Frederik Michael Krabbe, a naval officer and leading ship designer of that period. (Note: The spelling of the ship's name in records has varied slightly over the years eg Printz, Prinds, Prinz and several variations of Friderich, Frederich. The title used for this article is the name as on the design plans.) Two other ships — Norske Løve and Øresund — were constructed to the same design. Little is known of her service history beyond that she received a new keel in 1775. She was lost in 1780. Her wreck was rediscovered in 2018 by Kim Schmidt/Undervandsgruppen

== Service ==
In 1770–1771, the ship was part of a squadron under Admiral F. C. Kaas active off Algiers. During this time, on 1 October 1770 the ship ran aground at the entrance to Port Mahon
In September 1774, Printz Friderich returned to Denmark from the West Indies.

== Loss ==
On 29 September 1780, Printz Friderich was under the command of Andreas Lous, a well respected naval officer and chart maker of the period. She ran aground on the shoal Kobbergrund southeast of the island of Læsø in the Kattegat and was a total loss. The vast majority of the crew were rescued and landed on Læsø - only eight or ten men were drowned. Supplies were quickly sent to Læsø for the survivors. The court martial of Captain Lous and his officers for the loss of the ship exonerated Lous (who had been ill and confined to his cabin for three days), but considered three lower-ranking officers (Lars Kinck, Stibolt (Note: This was Andreas P. Stibolt. Three members of the extended Stibolt family served in HDMS Printz Friderich at various times.) and Fleischer) culpable.

Almost a month later the Danish frigate Kiel under Claus Frandsen Tønder also ran aground near Læsø but escaped without damage having jettisoned eight cannons. She then took on board one hundred of the Printz Friderich's crew from the island.

== Wreck ==
All sign of the ship disappeared from view, and almost from memory. In 2018 a specialist Underwater Group, using several forms of modern survey equipment eventually found the wreck largely intact. (Note: A similar search for HMS Belette, which in 1812 too was lost off Læsø, has so far proven unsuccessful.)

== See also ==
- article no:«Printz Friderich» (1761) on Norwegian wikipedia
- U-tube video of the wreck
