= Stibolt =

The family name Stibolt (alternative spelling Stiboldt) was closely associated with the Danish-Norwegian navy of the 18th century and with the island of Christiansø from the time that Hans Anderson Stibolt was appointed commandant of those most easterly islands of Denmark. His three sons all held naval officer rank, as did many of the subsequent generations, serving with a varied amount of success. Three generations held the post of Commandant on Christiansø. Caspar Henrik Stibolt (1692–1779),2nd-generation Commandant on Christiansø, was admitted to the Danish nobility by naturalization on 24 September 1777, claiming to belong to a German nobility, and his coat-of-arms confirmed.[4][Note 2]. He fathered eight future Danish naval officers, including Andreas Henrik Stibolt and Ernst Wilhelm Stibolt.

== P1 Progenitor ==
- Hans Andersen Stibolt (1660–1717), Lieutenant Colonel ( in the marine regiment) and Commandant on Christiansø. He had been raised in Jutland, but his father is believed to have come from Lübeck. (Note: The father's origins in Schleswig-Holstein thus did not automatically award him Danish citizenship, as the Dutchies were not a formal part of Denmark. This was rectified by Hans Anderson's son, Caspar -see below) He married Sophie Amalie Westerwald (1665–1746) from Bornholm.

== F1 Generation ==
- Andreas Henrik Stiboldt (1686–1726) Captain. He was skipper of the snow Snarensvend in 1718 when this ship was forced aground by enemy action, and burnt by his crew to prevent capture. For this he faced a court martial but was exonerated. Died on the voyage home from action at Reval. Five children.
- Caspar Henrik Stibolt (1692–1779) Commander. – Commandant on Christiansø He was admitted to the Danish nobility by naturalization on September 24, 1777, claiming to belong to a German nobility, and his coat-of-arms confirmed. (Note: Caveat: The article on Danish Wikipedia da:Stibolt is doubtful on this claim to nobility!)
  He fathered eight future Danish naval officers.
- Tyge Friderich Stibolt (or Stiboldt) (1695–1771), Captain. Served in various ships, including with the Danish West India Company to the Caribbean and land-based posts from Møen to Stavanger. As a junior lieutenant he was on board ship-of-the-line HDMS Wenden in the combined Danish-English fleet to Reval under admiral Michael Bille in 1726. No offspring recorded.

== F2 Generation – Andreas, plus adopted (step) children ==
- 1708–1764 Peter Lorentzen Stibolt, captain was the son of Lorentz Petersen Riis and Sidsel Margrethe Tønnesdatter. When his mother was widowed she then married Andreas Henrik Stibolt (in 1715), and the surname Stibolt so adopted by her two children. Peter Lorentzen Stibolt married Anna Cathrine Hesselberg and became the progenitor of the Norwegian Stibolts.

F3 – The Norwegian Branch of the Stibolts

  - Friderich Stibolt (1750–1787), senior lieutenant – unmarried. West Indies trade with Printz Friderich
  - 18 July 1743 – 1788 Lorentz Peter Stibolt, kptltnt. (Note: The Danish rank of kaptajnløjtnant is equivalent to the most senior lieutenant in the British royal navy – see Ranks and insignia of NATO navies' officers)
  - 15 March 1744 – 1813 (?) Andreas Petersen Stibolt as Lieutenant-Commander on HDMS Prins Friderich when wrecked, cashiered then reinstated with demotion and loss of seniority to the rank of senior lieutenant. Unmarried. (Note: Caveat – the dates of birth of these two brothers as reported by the references in Topsøe-Jensen cannot both be correct, both being in 1744 four months apart. The Geni website separates them more believably.)

== F2 Generation – Caspar ==
By Caspar Henrik Stibolt and his first wife Charlotte Hedevig Becher, who died 1776.

  - Thiel Erich Stibolt, commander (1726–1790)

By his second wife Catharina von Harasoffsky

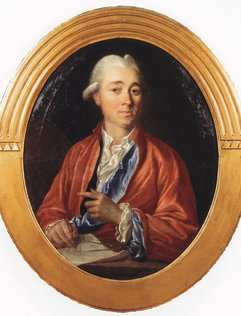
Andreas Henrik Stibolt (1759-1821)

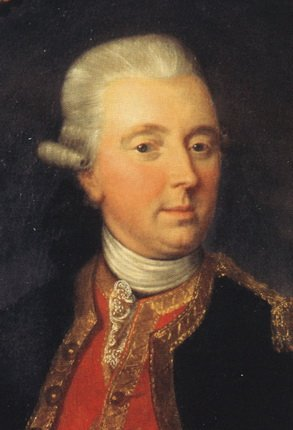
Hans Henrich Stibolt (1735-1793)

  - Andreas Henrik Stibolt (the second) (1739–1821). He saw service in the Mediterranean on board HDMS Delmenhorst and HDMS Sejeren and in 1770–71 with HDMS Prins Friderich in the squadron ordered to Algiers. Although highly commended by his senior officers, his later career as commander, and member of several naval committees in Copenhagen, was blighted by a court martial concerning the supply of masts to the navy.
    - (Grandson to Caspar) Jens Peter Stibolt 1774–1860 Viceadmiral
  - Christopher Stibolt (1747–1772), junior lieutenant on Grønland in Mediterranean, where he died off Algiers.
  - Ernst Wilhelm Stibolt(1741–1796) shipbuilder
  - Friderich Michael Stibolt (1756–1773), junior lieutenant. unmarried
  - Hans Henrich Stibolt (1735–1793), commander. Tranquebar and Mediterranean. unmarried.
  - Niels Madsen Stibolt (1728–1752), junior lieutenant died in East Indies on board HDMS Bornholm. unmarried.
  - Thomas Christian Stibolt(1744–1816). captain. From 1760 to 1764 he made various voyages with the Danish East India company. In 1765 he sat the lieutenants entrance exam for a naval commission, in which he was judged "well qualified, but no genius". He suffered from pleurisy, and had a long convalescence on Christiansø. He served on HDMS Wagrien to the East Indies in 1782 and reported fully on the commercial usefulness of the Nicobar Islands. In June 1783 he became the third generation Stibolt to be commandant of Christiansø. In 1784 a court martial convicted him of taking bribes three years earlier in one of his official posts.

== Citations ==
- Project Runeberg – Dansk biografisk Lexikon / XVI. Bind. Skarpenberg – Sveistrup /
- (in Danish)T. A. Topsøe-Jensen og Emil Marquard (1935) “Officerer i den dansk-norske Søetat 1660-1814 og den danske Søetat 1814-1932“. Two volumes. Download here.
