= Michael Johannes Petronius Bille =

Danish naval officer (1769–1845)

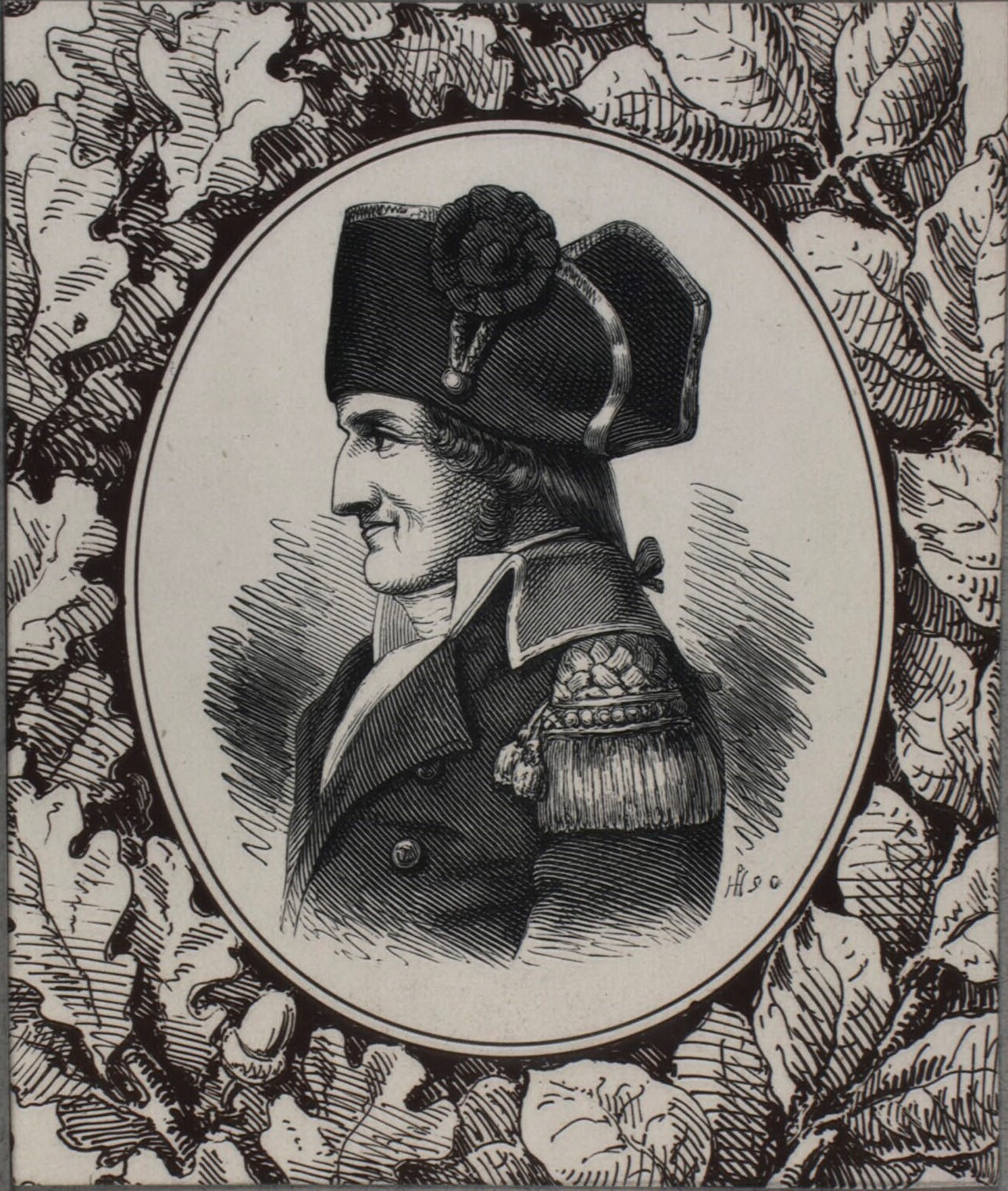
- Born: 8 November 1769; Stege, Denmark
- Died: 27 March 1845 (aged 75); Copenhagen, Denmark
- Burial place: Holmens Cemetery
- Relatives: Steen Andersen Bille; Michael Bille (1680–1756)
- Military career
- Allegiance: Denmark–Norway; Denmark; Prussia
- Branch: (Denmark) Royal Dano-Norwegian Navy; Royal Danish Navy; Prussian Naval Academy
- Service years: Denmark: 1789–1838; Prussia: 1821–1838
- Rank: Counter-Admiral
- Conflicts: Battle of Copenhagen

Counter-Admiral Michael Johannes Petronius Bille (8 November 1769 – 27 March 1845) was a Danish naval officer. Born in Stege on the island of Møn into a naval family, he served in the French Revolutionary and Napoleonic Wars.

== Career ==
He was sailing on the Danish frigate Bornholm (captained by his father Mathias) when it was caught in a hurricane off the Danish West Indies Islands. After days of struggle, the ship ran aground off Newport, County Mayo, Ireland on 17 March 1782. Mathias died in the affair. Bille became an officer in the Danish-Norwegian Navy in 1789 and participated in the Battle of Copenhagen on 2 April 1801, where he commanded the lower battery of the Prøvesteenen which fired the first shot at the British.

Over fifteen years, he also served as a teacher of mathematics and astronomy at the Seekadettenakademiet (Dansk Søværnets Officersskole). From 1807-11, he served as a captain stationed in Kristiansand in charge of the gunboat squadron (Roflotillen). In 1812-1813 he commanded a French warship in the Scheldt. From 1815 he served as pilot inspector in Helsingør until he entered Prussian service in 1820.

In 1821, he began a very fruitful career as director of the Prussian Navigationsschule in Danzig. After three years he moved the school into a building that lay outside Danzig at the mouth of the Radaune River because the St. Jacob Church was inadequate. The school was then assigned to the war schooner Stralsund commanded by Longé. From 1825 the school also had the gunboat Danzig. Bille and the vessels were under the authority of the Ministry of War in Berlin. This may be seen as the beginning of the Prussian Navy. The number of students increased from 40 in 1827, to 115-120 in 1831.

He resigned from Prussian service 3 May 1838 because he had become a counter admiral in the Danish Navy, which was also his resignation from the Danish navy. He had performed excellently and was still well remembered in 1897: “A better leader for this branch of navigation at that time would have been difficult to find. The Danish origin was not an obstacle to him while fulfilling his official duties with pleasure and zeal."

As counter admiral, from 1838, he busied himself with writing and research in natural sciences. In 1840, he published a book on navigation Tankar om och i navigationen. He died in Copenhagen 27 March 1845.

== Writings ==
Bille, Michael von (1840). Tankar om och i navigationen. Carl Deleen.

== Sources ==
- Halvorsen, J.B., ed. (1884). Norsk forfatter-lexikon, 1814-1880. Paa grundlag af J. E. Krafts og Chr. Langes 'Norsk forfatter-lexikon 1814-1856' (in Norwegian). Vol. 1. Kristiania: Den Norske Forlagsforening. p. 254.
