= Kobbergrund =

Shoal in the Kattegat

Kobbergrund is a shoal in the Kattegat 11 kilometers (7 miles) East South East of the Danish island of Læsø, lying close to the main shipping lanes from the south.

== Shipwrecks ==
It is the site of several shipwrecks, including the Russian ship Baron Stieglitz in 1840 and the earlier Printz Friderich, a Danish ship-of-the-line in 1780. The wreck of the latter was newly discovered in 2018 by a team using modern survey equipment. The shoal was known in English as "Kobber Ground".

== Survey ==
The survey of Danish coasts and waters begun in 1791, and restarted after a hiatus in 1827, saw the first general chart for the Kattegat published in 1844.
On 20 November 1853 the Danish government anchored a lightvessel on the Ground at 57°8′30″N 11°20′30″E. The vessel was schooner-rigged, painted with a white cross on each site, and carried three lights on her mast.

== Lightships ==
The Danish government stationed lightships at Kobbergrund from 1853 to 1908.

Lightship	When stationed	Launch year	Shipyard	Length	Breadth
Fyrskib No. V	1853–1854; 1880–1896	1853	Naval shipyard	22m	5.6m
Fyrskib No. VI	1854-1857	1854	Naval shipyard	22m	5.7m
Fyrskib No. VII	1862, 1867, 1872, & 1882-1895	1867	Naval shipyard	22m	5.7m
Fyrskib No. IV	1896-1908	1851	Nyholms Shipyard	22m	5.6m
