= Michael Bille (1680–1756) =

Royal Dano-Norwegian Navy officer (1680–1756)

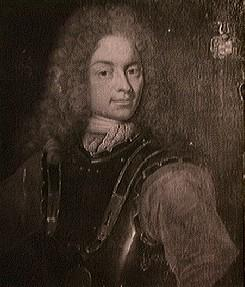
Michael Bille

Vice-Admiral Michael Bille (14 May 1680 – 2 May 1756) was a Royal Dano-Norwegian Navy officer who served in the Great Northern War. He was commissioned as a junior lieutenant in 1699, advancing steadily to become Vice Admiral when he retired in 1737.

== Family ==
Born 14 May 1680, the younger son of Colonel Steen Andersen Bille and brother to Just Anderson Bille, Michael (Mikkel or Michel) Bille was uncle to one Danish admiral—Rear Admiral Daniel Ernst Bille (1711–1790)—and father and grandfather to two more, viz Rear Admiral Bendix Lasson Bille (1723–1784) and Rear Admiral Michael Johannes Petronius Bille (1769–1845).

== Career ==
As a cadet at the age of 14 Michael Bille was given permission to sail with the Danish East India Company to the far east, a voyage of about two years duration. In 1699 he joined the crew of the ship-of-the-line Nellebladet and was promoted to junior lieutenant. In 1700 he was on board the frigate Blaaheyren.

In 1702–1703 he served in the Dutch navy and in 1705–1706 was recruiting officer for West Jutland. With further promotion in 1707 he was given the responsibility of moving and improving the lighthouse on the island of Anholt. In 1708 Bille was again in the service of the Royal Dutch Navy for a short while. On his journey to Holland his vessel had been “visited” by pirates who took whatsoever they wanted. (Note: Caveat: The reference Project Runeberg has Bille serving in the British navy, with no mention of Holland. Topsøe Jensen is more detailed.)

On return, after serving on the 50-gun Stiernen, Bille became captain of the frigate Ørnen in the Baltic on whose cruise he reported in September 1709. Operating near the island of Bornholm he took several prizes in the Great Northern War with Sweden.

Promoted again in March 1710, he commanded the ship-of-the-line Oldenborg in the fleet of Gyldenløve. 1711 found him back as recruitment officer in West Jutland, then as second in command of the ship-of-the-line Fridericus Quartus until the middle of August when the ship was severely damaged by a fire that claimed the lives of three men.

In 1712 in command of the ship-of-the-line Delmenhorst, he served in Gyldenløve's fleet, and later under Admiral Raben at the action of 30 September near Rügen. (Note: One of several naval engagements between the Danes and the Swedes that year in the tussle for Stralsund. More details in German Wikipedia at de:Seeschlacht vor Rügen (1712) and in Norwegian Wikipedia at no:Rügen-affæren) During the battle one of his ship's cannons exploded killing and wounding some of his crew (an event which was to recur on the same ship a few years later). Convoy duties with Delmenhorst in 1713 were followed by a land appointment in 1714 as head of recruitment in East Jutland.

In 1715, once more on Delmenhorst, he again fought the Swedish fleet, this time at the Battle of Fehmarn (1715), after which battle he was promoted to commodore and awarded a gold medal. Later, on 8 August 1715, off Jasmund on Rügen he was again in action during the Battle of Rügen, engaging three Swedish ships in quick succession, until he had used all the ship's gunpowder. It was in this action that another of Delmenhorst’s cannons exploded, killing one crew member and injuring three. Transferred to command the ship-of-the-line Havfruen (the mermaid) in the Baltic fleet Bille was then ordered, in January 1716, to take charge of the sea batteries off Copenhagen.

== Flag rank ==
On Christmas Eve 1717, Bille was promoted to Rear Admiral and appointed Deputy in the Danish admiralty. In 1718, in the ship-of-the-line Wenden he commanded a squadron under admiral Raben, and from July an independent squadron operating in the Baltic. 1720 saw Bille with orders to go to Pomerania (esp. Stralsund) his main task was to remove the timber and other materials for shipbuilding, and to prepare transport for repatriation of the Danish troops as the Swedes approached. He sought advice on how to pay for this. (Note: Rügen and Stralsund were occupied and administered by the Danes from early 1716, but returned to Sweden by the treaty of Frederiksborg of July 1720. See Swedish Pomerania.)

In 1721, Bille was sent with the Snow Hummeren (the lobster) to Danzig and Riga to buy and load a cargo of hemp for the fleet. In consideration of the many extra expenses he incurred on this voyage in the monarch’s interest, he was awarded a special daily allowance plus the services of a personal secretary and a servant.

In 1723, Bille flew his flag in Nordstiernen with a squadron of seven ships-of-the-line and a number of lesser ships. In 1725, he complained to the king about “the secret commission” - a whispering campaign against him in the royal court. Such complaints of dishonourable conduct were dismissed as unfounded. In the same year, he commanded a squadron of ten ships-of-the-line until it was recalled and the ships laid up on the grounds that the danger of war was past.

The following year (1726), he sailed with eight ships-of-the-line and four frigates, again flying his flag in Nordstiernen, under sealed orders. Many of the fleet were in poor condition, dilapidated and leaky. Together with a similar sized British squadron they instituted a blockade of the Russian fleet in Reval (modern day Tallinn). One of his ships, HDMS Ebenetzer sprang a leak and was sent home with the frigate Søridderen, whilst his former command HDMS Beskiermeren ran aground at the approaches to Reval and was rescued only by the timely attention of the English admiral. The blockade of Reval began on 7 July 1726 until the approach of winter demanded withdrawal. October storms ravaged the fleet and separated many of the ships from each other. When they reached Danzig for repairs before sailing on to Copenhagen there was much sickness aboard (scurvy and pneumonias). The investigations by the Danish Admiralty into all the accidents and poor management of the 1726 campaign were to reverberate for the next three years.

From 1729 to 1735, he was head of the naval shipyard at Holmen. It was after this period that the head of the Danish navy, Count F Danneskjold-Samsøe instituted the court martial process against fabrikmester Knud Benstrup in relation to the building of HDMS Christianus Sixtus, during which Bille was found to have been negligent in the performance of his duties and lost the confidence of the Danish King, Christian VI. In consideration of Bille's previous good service, court martial proceedings were not called for against him, but the monarch took a strong interest in the case and, in 1737, had Bille retired from the service with the rank and pension of Vice Admiral.

== Retirement ==
Bille retired quietly to Holbæk where he died on 2 May 1756, twelve days before his 76th birthday. His body was transferred to the chapel of the naval Church of Holmen on 29 May that year.

== Citations ==
- (in Danish) Project Runeberg : C F Bricka on Mikkel Bille in Danish Biographical Dictionary
- Royal Danish Naval Museum website - Danish ships
- Royal Danish Naval Museum - Menu - Skibregister for record cards where these exist.
- (in Danish) T. A. Topsøe-Jensen og Emil Marquard (1935) “Officerer i den dansk-norske Søetat 1660–1814 og den danske Søetat 1814–1932" (Danish Naval Officers). Two volumes (Volume 1 and Volume 2).
