= HDMS Justitia (1707) =

Ship

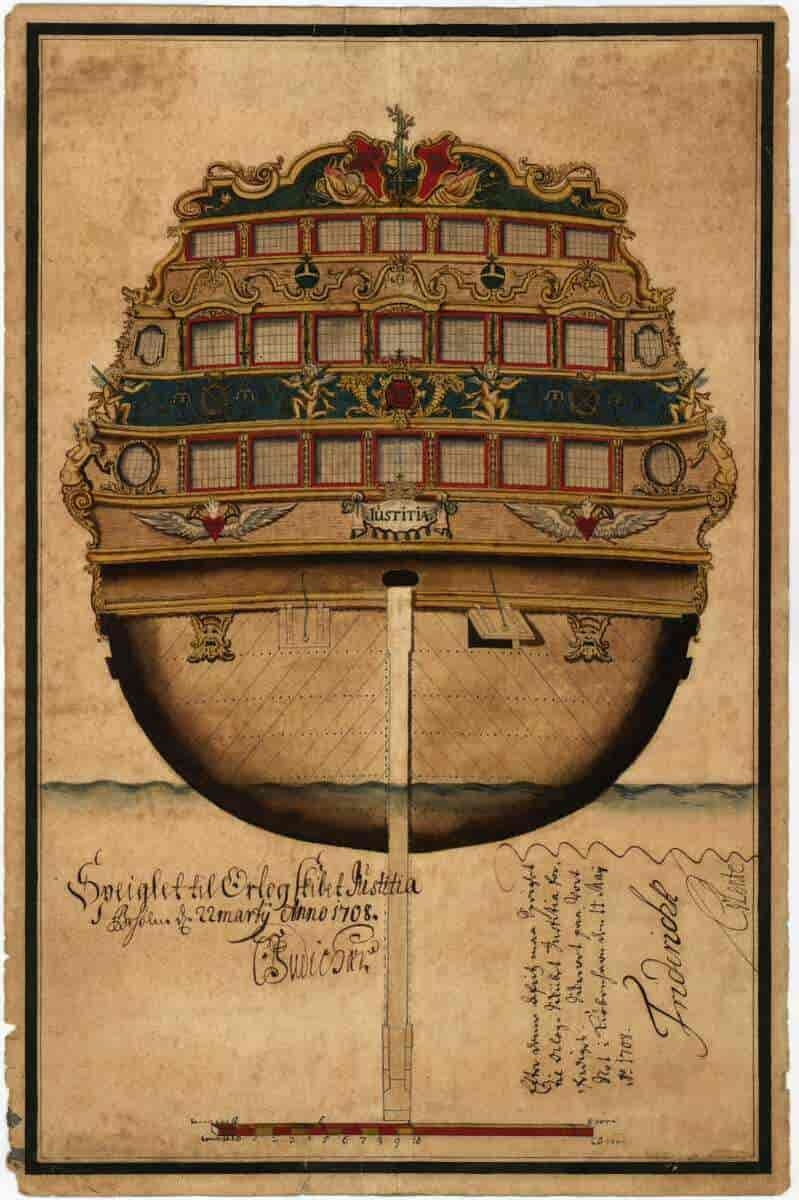

History

Denmark-Norway
- Name: Justitia
- Namesake: Justitia
- Builder: Judichaer at Nyholm, Copenhagen
- Launched: 1707
- Commissioned: 1708
- Decommissioned: 1751
- Honours and awards: Great Northern War
- Fate: Broken up in 1751

General characteristics
- Type: Ship-of-the-line
- Length: 168 ft 0 in (51.21 m) (Danish)
- Beam: 44 ft 6 in (13.56 m) (Danish)
- Draught: 18 ft 0 in (5.49 m)(forward); 21 ft 0 in (6.40 m)(aft) - Danish
- Sail plan: Full-rigged ship
- Complement: 725, later 662 or 654
- Armament: 24 × 24-pounder guns; 24 × 18-pounder guns; 18 × 12-pounder guns; 20 × 8-pounder guns

HDMS Justitia was a ship-of-the-line designed by Ole Judichaer built at Nyholm, Copenhagen for the Royal Danish-Norwegian Navy.

== Construction and design ==
Justitia was constructed at Nyholm Dockyard to a design by Ole Judichær. She was launched on 1 December 1703. She was 168 ft 0 in (51.21 m) long with a beam of 44 ft 6 in (13.56 m) and a draught of 18 ft 0 in (5.49 m)(forward). Her complement was 725 men. Her armament was 70 to 86 guns.

== Career ==
=== 1710–1720 ===
In the long ongoing Great Northern War Sweden had finally lost the Baltic States to Russia in 1710, and sought to maintain its hold on the southern Baltic coast of Pomerania at Stralsund. Denmark determined to thwart Sweden's intentions. From March 1710 Justitia was the flagship of Vice Admiral Niels Lavritzen Barfoed, whose squadron formed part of General Admiral Gyldenløve's Danish fleet which established a blockade of Stralsund in 1711. Her captain at this time was Lauritz Valkendorf. The town and area of Stralsund was also under siege from the land by Danish and Russian, Saxon and Prussian forces.

After Gyldenløve retired ashore in December 1711, Barfoed assumed command of the fleet which retired to Copenhagen in January 1712 due to the freezing winter weather. Sailing again in his flagship Justitia at the head of a fleet of ten ships-of-the-line, four frigates and a number of lesser craft Barfoed returned to the blockade in 1712 but was too timid in the face of the Swedish fleet which reinforced Stralsund. (Barfoed was court-martialled for his lack of action, but proceedings were later abandoned).

Justitia, captained by Lauritz Christopher Ulfeldt, was again the flagship in 1713, this time under Vice Admiral Knud Reedtz, but again the Swedes managed to resupply Stralsund and later orders from Copenhagen to seek out the enemy fleet and bring them to battle appear to have achieved nothing. During this year Rudolf Cruys, son of the Norwegian Dutch admiral in Russian service Cornelius Cruys, served aboard Justitia. In 1714 Cornelius Blichfeldt, newly promoted to the rank of captain, was second in command of ship-of-the-line Justitia. His superior on Justitia was Rasmus Krag, who the following year observed the Battle of Rügen on Admiral Raben's flagship Elephanten with the admiral's staff.

Vice Admiral Christen Thomesen Sehested flew his flag from Justitia as commander of the vanguard of Raben's fleet which was sent on 9 July 1715 to Pomerania to ensure passage of troop transports of 6,000 men to the forces besieging Stralsund. When the Swedish fleet appeared in overwhelming force, Admiral Raben withdrew the main part of the Danish fleet to the Øresund to gather reinforcements leaving Justitia and her squadron to occupy the Swedes' attention without actually engaging. As Admiral Raben returned with the requisite reinforcements, Sehested was removed from Justitia and Vice Admiral Just Juel, who had been active on several ships since 1712 in the fleet blockading Stralsund, took over. Justitia was now the flagship of the rear guard as the Swedish fleet was engaged on 8 August 1715, off Jasmund (North East Rügen). Among of the many dead in the engagement was Admiral Juel. Christian Koningh, whose conduct during the August battle as captain of the Danish ship Nellebladet was subjected to an investigation, was appointed captain of Justitia in August the following year. For part of 1715 Knud Nielsen Benstrup, the future fabrikmester at Holmen, served as a junior lieutenant on Justitia and again in 1716.

In 1716 Jacob Dos was flag captain to Admiral Raben in Justitia. 1717 saw two separate captains of Justitia, Søren Hansen Lange until the end of May 1717, succeeded by Henrik Petersen Ørck. In 1718 Vice Admiral Ulrich Kaas commanded a squadron from Justitia in Admiral Raben's Baltic fleet. Floris Friess was flag captain to Admiral Kaas.

=== 1720–1725 ===
Nearly 13 years of war had taken its toll on both the navy and the Danish national treasury. In 1725 many of the Danish fleet's ships-of-the-line were laid up by order of the Danish Admiralty, as it was perceived that all danger of war had receded. In 1723 Lieutenant-Captain Gaspard Frédéric le Sage de Fontenay, fresh from observing the Russian fleet movements off Reval (Tallinn), served for a while in Justitia (Note: Carl Friderich de Fontenay, the son of Admiral Gaspard Frédéric le Sage de Fontenay (who had served on this ship-of-the-line in 1723) became a vice admiral in his own right and flew his flag in the later HDMS Justitia (1777)) under captain Wolter Jansen. In 1724 Captain Albert Danielsen (Daniel) was the subject of a complaint from one of his lieutenants that, contrary to regulations, his wife handled the monthly payments due to the lower ranks of the company of soldiers now serving on Justitia. The ensuing court martial found against captain Danielsen but allowed him to take voluntary retirement with promotion in 1726.

Germund Jensen Lund (after a two-year voyage with the Danish East India Company) was appointed captain of Justitia on 1 January 1725. Lund moved on to captain other ships in 1726, and Justitia appears to have been laid up (along with much of the Danish fleet dilapidated by war) for some fifteen years.

=== 1739–1751 ===
Plans for a deck cabin "of iron" (possibly a galley) were drawn up in 1739 by the new fabrikmester (chief naval architect) D Thura. and Justitia was brought back into service by 1743. Tensions were rising in the Baltic with the Swedish Dalecarlian rebellion (1743) and the Russo-Swedish War (1741–1743). Justitia acted as admiral Jens Rosenpalm's flagship with Johan Christopher Holst as flag captain in the summer of 1743. The entire Danish fleet was commanded by Lieutenant-admiral Frederik Danneskiold-Samsøe (son of Ulrich Christian Gyldenløve). This display of force was the last act of the ship, Justitia, which was decommissioned and broken up in 1751.

== The ship remembered ==
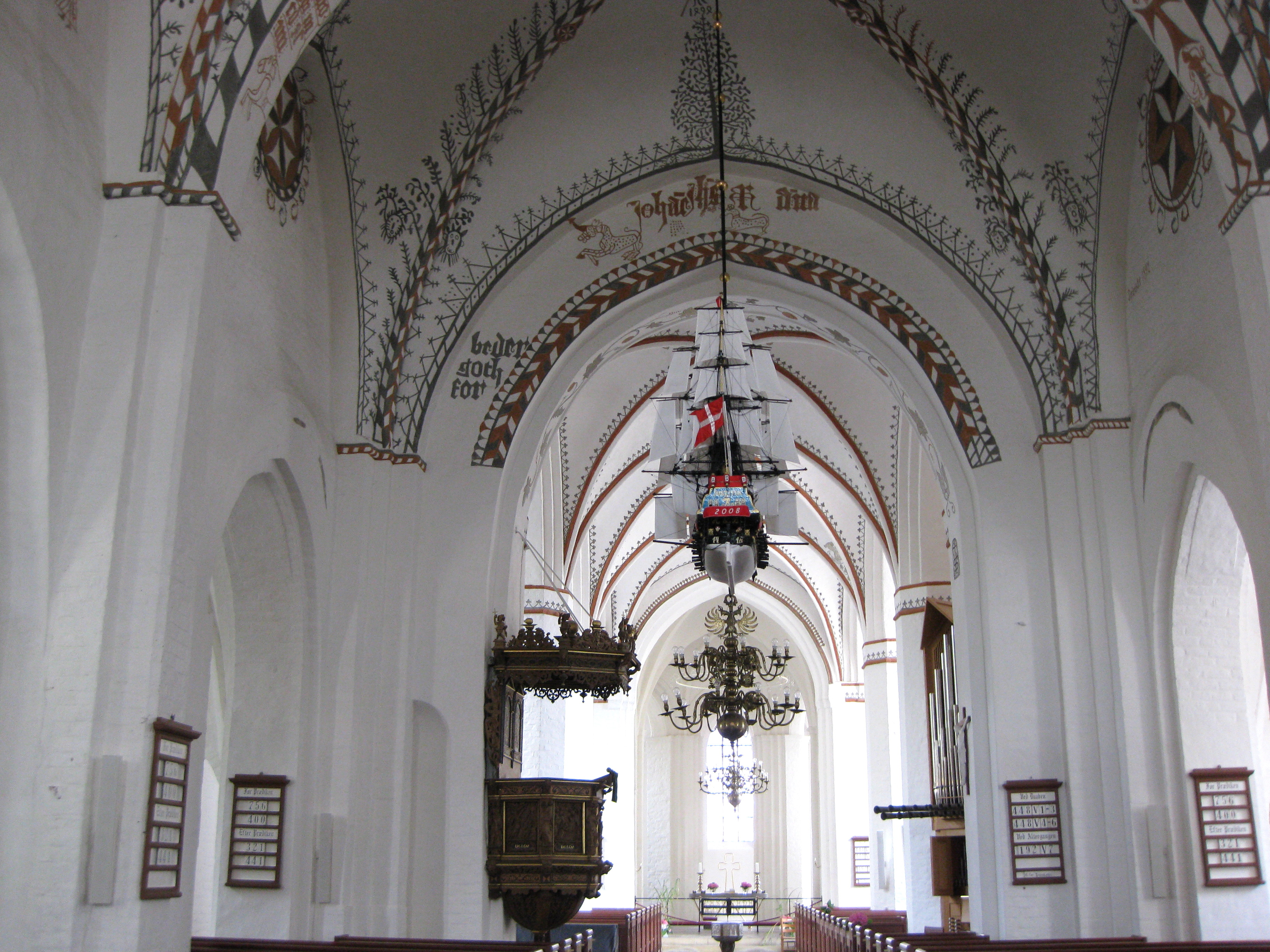
The ship model in Stege Church.

A model of HDMS Justitia has been adopted by Stege Kirke on Møn. The model, which was presented to the church in 1718, is taken down every ten years for cleaning and any necessary repairs.

== Sources ==
- Balsved, Johnny E. "The Navy Before 1801: The Birth of a Navy, the first Operations, and 200 years of Danish-Swedish War". Translated by Robert Rayce.
- "Søgeresultat - Justitia" (in Danish). Royal Danish Naval Museum. Archived from the original on 2005-11-01.
- "Justitia (1707)". Skibregister (in Danish). Archived from the original on 29 October 2005.
- "Danish Second Rate ship of the line 'Justitia' (1707)". Threedecks.org.
- Topsøe-Jensen, T. A.; Marquard, Emil (1935). Officerer i den dansk-norske Søetat 1660–1814 og den danske Søetat 1814–1932 (PDF) (in Danish). Vol. 1.
- Topsøe-Jensen, T. A.; Marquard, Emil (1935). Officerer i den dansk-norske Søetat 1660–1814 og den danske Søetat 1814–1932 (PDF) (in Danish). Vol. 2.
