= HDMS Elephanten (1703) =

18th-century Danish warship

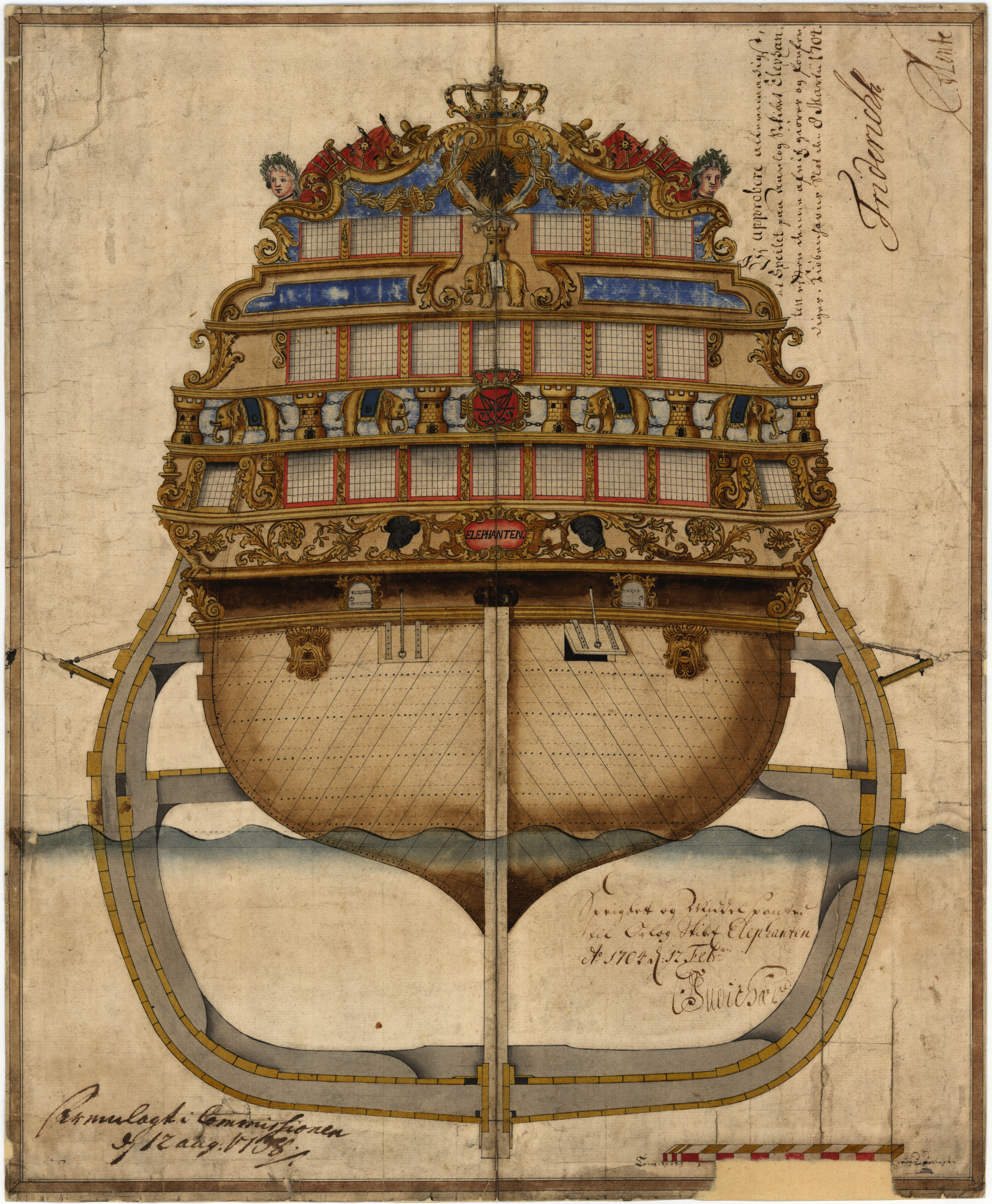
- Watercolor of HDMS Elephanten, view from aft showing midship cross-section

History

Denmark
- Name: Elephanten
- Namesake: The Order of the Elephant
- Builder: Judichær
- Laid down: 1702
- Launched: 14 April 1703
- In service: 1703
- Out of service: 1728
- Refit: 1726 (mismanaged, ship unserviceable)
- Fate: Scuttled to create artificial island Elefanten at Holmen, Copenhagen

General characteristics
- Type: Ship of the line
- Length: 169 feet 10 inches (51.77 m)
- Beam: 45 feet (14 m)
- Draught: 19 feet (5.8 m) (aft), 17 feet 9 inches (5.41 m) (fore)
- Decks: 3
- Sail plan: Full-rigged ship
- Complement: 824
- Armament: 90 guns
- Notes: The 90 guns were 26 each of 36 pd, 18 pd, and 12 pd and 12 of 6 pd.

HDMS Elephanten (transl. The elephant, from the Order of the Elephant) was a ship of the line of the Royal Dano-Norwegian Navy that served from 1703 to 1728. There were three other Danish ships-of-the line of the same name, dating from 1684, 1741 and 1773. The ship was sometimes referred to as Nye Elefant (transl. New Elephant) to differentiate from others of similar name. For much of her service career, which coincided with the Great Northern War, Elephanten was the flagship of the Danish fleet active in the Baltic Sea.

== Ship's career ==
In 1710 Elephanten participated in the Battle of Køge Bay, where she served as flagship for Admiral Ulrik Gyldenløve. Elephanten remained Gyldenløve's flagship until 1712 when the Danish fleet was heavily involved in the ongoing siege of Stralsund. Captain Otto Jacob Thambsen was the flag captain during 1711 and 1712.

In 1712 Jacob Dos had been flag captain to Vice Admiral Peter Raben on HDMS Wenden and (after a spell of sickness) was again Raben's flag captain when Raben commanded the Baltic fleet from Elephanten in 1714 and 1715. This was a period in which the fleet of 15 ships-of-the-line escorted a squadron and fleet of troop transports under Christen Thomesen Sehested to Pomerania and which included the successful Battle of Rügen. Dos was again flag captain to Admiral Raben on Elephanten in 1718.

In early October 1715 Gyldenløve again took command of Denmark's Baltic fleet, again flying his flag in Elephanten. For three weeks Ulrich Kaas was his flag captain before his own promotion to rear admiral, then Rasmus Krag took over.

Elephanten continued to lead the Danish fleet in the Baltic throughout 1716 and 1717 with Admiral Gyldenløve in command. Commodore (later Admiral) Wiglas von Schindel, was the flag captain in these later stages.

=== 1726 ===
By the end of the Great Northern War much of the Danish fleet was seriously dilapidated and in need of refitting and repair. The refitting of Elephanten at the Danish naval base of Holmen was mismanaged and expensive, resulting in a ship that was unfit for service, for which Ole Judichær was blamed. (Note: Another ship, HDMS Ebenetzer, had a poor refit at the same time and had to return early from its next mission leaking badly. See Naval Blockade of Reval (1726).)

== Fate ==
She was scuttled in 1728 to create the artificial island Elefanten at Holmen, Copenhagen.

The ship's former anchor was recovered from the Bay of Køge in 1979. In October the same year it was inaugurated as a local landmark in a donation from Sejlklubben Greve Strand in connection with the celebration of the harbour's 50 years' anniversary.

== Citations ==
- Royal Danish Naval Museum – List of Ships Names - for details of most ships which have served in the Royal Danish Navy
- Byvandring 6 - A guide to the area of Holmen, City of Copenhagen for walking or cycling (for Elefanten see section 6.6) - in Danish ISBN 9788761658494. Copyright forfatterne og Systime A/S 2019
- Royal Danish Naval Museum Skibregister for record cards where they exist
- Topsøe-Jensen, T.A.; Marquard, Emil, eds. (1935a). Officerer i Den dansk-norske Søetat 1660-1814 og Den danske Søetat 1814-1932 (in Danish). Vol. I. Copenhagen: Pedersen & Lefevre.
- Topsøe-Jensen, T.A.; Marquard, Emil, eds. (1935b). Officerer i Den dansk-norske Søetat 1660-1814 og Den danske Søetat 1814-1932 (in Danish). Vol. II. Copenhagen: Pedersen & Lefevre.
