= Admiral Kaas =

Admiral Kaas may refer to:

- Frederik Christian Kaas (1725–1803), Royal Dano-Norwegian Navy admiral
- Frederik Christian Kaas (1727–1804), Royal Dano-Norwegian Navy admiral
- Ulrich Kaas (1677–1746), Royal Dano-Norwegian Navy admiral
