= Frederik Kaas (1730 - 1759) =

Danish naval officer

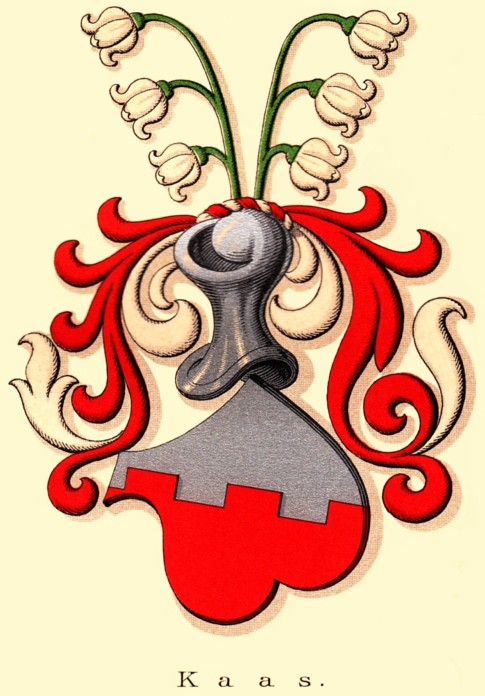
- Coat of arms of Kaas-af-Mur (af Mur refers to the wall or battlement on the shield)
- Born: 1730 (baptised 20 June); Copenhagen
- Died: 10 September 1759; Pondicherry, India
- Military career
- Allegiance: Denmark–Norway (1739-1759)
- Branch: (Denmark) Royal Dano-Norwegian Navy
- Service years: 1739 -1759
- Rank: Lieutenant
- Conflicts: Pondicherry

Frederik Kaas (1730 – 10 September 1759) was a Danish naval officer who also saw service with other navies. He died in the Battle of Pondicherry in a French warship.

== Personal life ==
As the son of Admiral Ulrich Kaas (1677 - 1746) and Mette Sørensdatter Mathiesen, Frederik Kaas was christened at Holmens Kirke on 20 June 1730. He had four older brothers who would also become Danish naval officers. He never married. His family was one of the ancient nobility of Denmark, the Mur-Kaas.

== Career ==
From the age of twelve Frederik Kaas was enrolled as a cadet in the Royal Danish navy (officially from 1747) and was commissioned as a Junior Lieutenant on 27 December 1749. In 1750 he joined the Construction Committee (Note: Frederik's older brother, Frederik Christian, also started training at the Construction Committee, but two years earlier. Neither went on to specialise in ship construction)

1751 -1754 he served on the ship-of-the-line Nellebladet in a voyage to the East Indies, at the end of which he was promoted to Senior Lieutenant and appointed adjutant to the head of the Holmen navy base, Admiral Suhm.

Early in 1776 promotion to captain gave him command of Hvide Ørn (1753) which was active in a joint Danish-Swedish squadron in the North Sea

In 1757 Frederik Kaas was permitted to seek service in the French navy. (Note: Service with foreign navies was a common occurrence for Danish officers to further their experience in times of peace for their home country) He reported that he had arrived too late at Brest to join the squadron of Bois de la Motte, but in August he was posted to a warship of 74 guns which was sailing to the East Indies.

== Fate ==
Frederik Kaas was killed in a battle with a British warship off Pondicherry on 10 September 1759.

== Citation ==
- Kronoskaf - Battle of Pondicherry
- (in Danish)T. A. Topsøe-Jensen og Emil Marquard (1935) “Officerer i den dansk-norske Søetat 1660-1814 og den danske Søetat 1814-1932“. Two volumes. Download here.
