= Knud Nielsen Benstrup =

Danish naval officer

- Born: 1692; Ebeltoft, Denmark
- Died: 26 February 1742 (aged 49–50) Ebeltoft
- Allegiance: Denmark
- Branch: Royal Danish Navy
- Service years: 1706–1739
- Rank: Kommandørkaptajn (Commander, Senior Grade)
- Known for: Senior officer (overfabrikmester) at the Royal Danish naval shipyards; Ship designs
- Conflicts: Great Northern War

Knud Nielsen Benstrup (1692 – 26 February 1742) was a Danish naval officer and the senior officer, overfabrikmester, at the Royal Danish naval shipyards, until his career was blighted by court martial and imprisonment.

== Personal ==
Benstrup was born in 1692 in the East Jutland town of Ebeltoft where his father was town clerk.

== Career ==
From his start as a cadet in 1706 Knud Benstrup was on active service throughout the Great Northern War, in 1715 as a junior lieutenant in the ships-of-the-line Justitia and then Ditmarsken under Admiral Christian Thomesen Sehested in the Pommeranian campaigns. In 1723, after the war, he served as adjutant to Admiral Andreas Rosenpalm in Norway. From here, he was ordered home and sent, in the spring of 1714, to France where he would study the theory and mathematics of ship design and the practice of shipbuilding at Brest which at that time was a centre of excellence.

From junior lieutenant in 1714, he was steadily promoted until his rank was commander, senior grade (kommandørkaptajn), in 1731.

From his study of shipbuilding in France, he visited Holland to learn about the handling of timber and briefly visited Britain before returning to Copenhagen in 1729 where he was appointed fabrikmester at the naval dockyards of Holmen, two years after Admiral Ole Judichær, who had led naval shipbuilding for many years, had been dismissed from that post following a court martial. Lieutenant Lauritz Bragenæs, who had been in England for the same period along with Diderich de Thurah, was appointed joint fabrikmester with Benstrup, but died shortly after. Thurah was then appointed in place of Bragenæs, but with the older Benstrup as his superior.

Benstrup's first job in the Danish shipyards was to take over responsibility for the building of a ship-of-the-line designed by Rasmus Krag. The latter was most annoyed at being replaced and became a fierce opponent of Benstrup through the rest of his career.

Benstrup's designs

In contrast with Ole Judichær's broad, slow sailing, unwieldy ships, Benstrup placed his main emphasis on ships with sharp, fine lines whereby the Danish fleet came to be in possession of various warships with good sailing qualities, and a much lower incidence of keel failure than previous ships. His system was not to the liking of all the fleet's officers, especially the older generation. The complaints about his construction methods should now be seen as without merit, as the Danish admiralty allocated smaller budgets per ship built, resulting in many smaller vessels rather than very large ships-of-the-line. In 1731, at the same time as his promotion to commander, he was named senior fabrikmester.

Benstrup's ships

The following ships-of-the-line are attributed to Benstrup's finer designs

- Christianus Sixtus (1733)
- Delmenhorst (1735)
- Dronning Lovisa (1744)
- Jylland (1739)
- Kiøbenhavn (1744)
- Markgrevinde Sophia Christine (1732)
- Norske Løve (1735)
- Ditmarschen Oldenburg (1732)
- Prindsesse Charlotte Amalie (1731)
- Prindsesse Lovise (1731)
- Prindsesse Sophia Hedevig (1731)
- Slesvig (1733)
- Svanen (1730)
- Tre Løver (1730)
- Wenden (1742)

Plus the frigate Blaa Heyren (1734) and the armed trading ship Kongen af Danmark (1735)

== Court martial and imprisonment ==
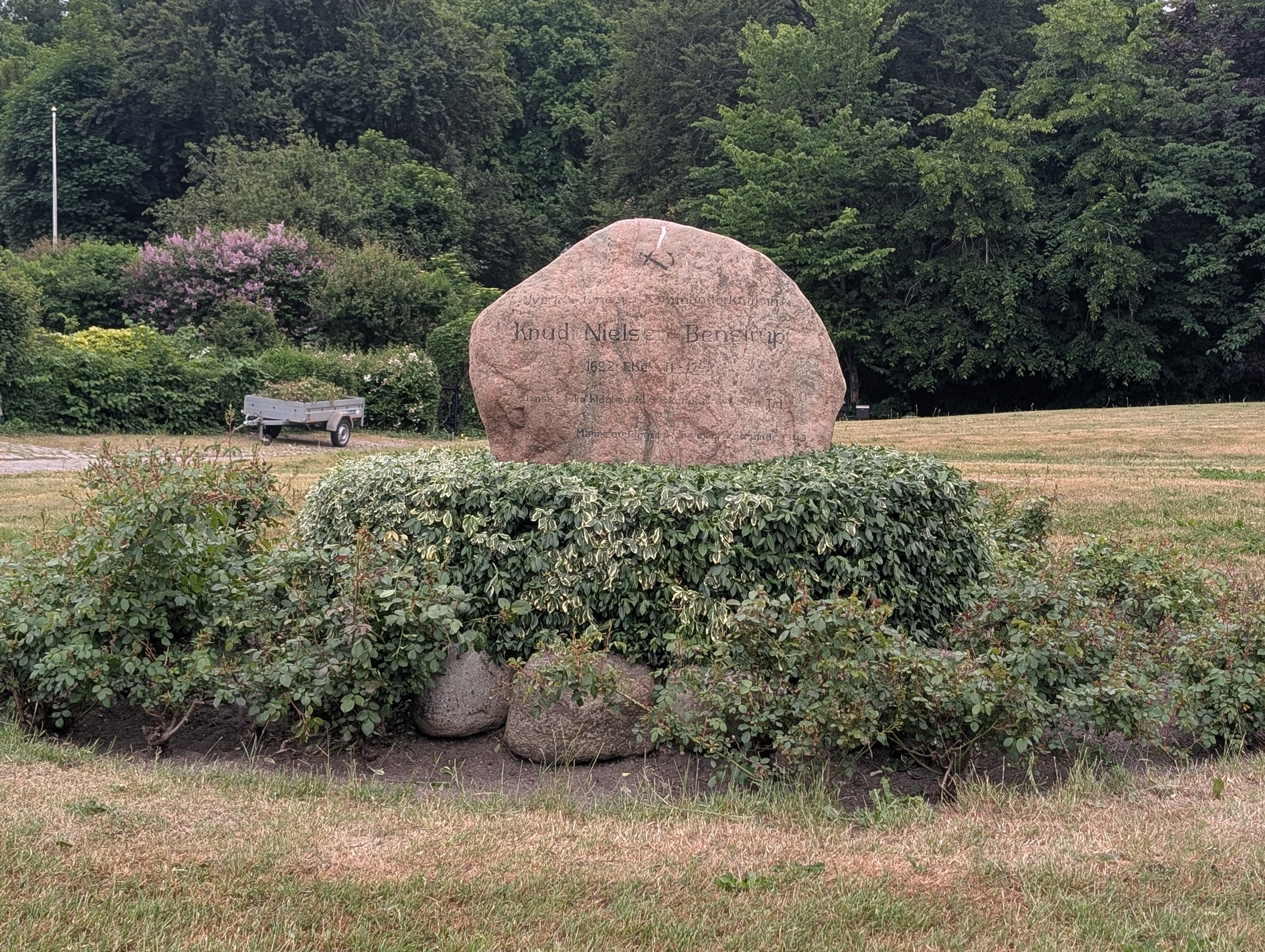
Knud Benstrup memorial stone in Ebeltoft

Problems began to mount for Benstrup with the launch of the ship-of-the-line Christianus Sixtus in 1733 , when it was discovered that the ship had a draught six inches deeper than planned. Diderich de Thurah had spotted and warned of the potential problem earlier, noticing that much of the timber used in the ship's construction had been insufficiently seasoned, and thus was heavier. The extra draught would not, of itself, have been fatal as there were other ships in the fleet with deeper draughts. Benstrup was ordered by Admiral M Bille to strip out excess timber without altering the integrity of the hull but in doing so he departed from the design plans that had had royal approval.

In 1734 a royal commission was established to investigate the problem. The commission (Note: comprising commanders Suhm, Krag, Neuspitzer and Coningh, and captains Thurah, Lütken og Lützow, many of whom had fallen out with Benstrup) decided by a majority and gave Benstrup a severe sentence - execution was suggested by Krag - which Lütken and Lützow took heavy objection to.

Here the characters of the main participants played a part. Benstrup was forceful, but honest and straightforward, but he had got on the wrong side of Count Frederik Danneskiold-Samsøe, (Note: Count Frederik Danneskiold-Samsøe was appointed head of the Danish navy in 1735 - see Balsved) who was known to be both capable and ruthless. Other senior officers sided with the Count.

To obtain clarity in the case, King Christian VI called them all in for a meeting where Lütken took the opportunity to express himself so boldly that he made enemies of both King Christian and Count Danneskiold. Benstrup himself got the opportunity later to present his defence against the accusations but did so without legal representation and in such a fierce and disrespectful manner that he was forced to face a court martial which deemed he had broken his terms of office and sentenced him to imprisonment in Kastellet, the military citadel and prison. Here he remained until 1739 when he was pardoned and released but banished from Copenhagen.

== Consequences ==
The "problem" ship Christianus Sixtus served for 35 years, being decommissioned in 1769.

With the removal of Benstrup, none of the remaining shipbuilders (Krag, Thuresen, and Thurah) proved up to the required standard, although Thurah retained the title and salary of fabrikmester for many years. Danneskiold prevailed on the newly formed Construction Committee to employ the Frenchman Laurent Barbé as the main shipwright to the Danish navy.

== Banishment and death ==
Forbidden to leave Denmark and banished from Copenhagen, but in possession of a pension, Benstrup chose to return to his home town of Ebeltoft where he lived until his death on 26 February 1742.

== Citations ==
Much of this article is translated from the Danish Wikipedia article da:Knud Nielsen Benstrup, checked and augmented against the in-line references cited.

- Nielsen E. - Danish Military History website - Major Danish Warships Built at the Holmen Shipyard 1692-1744
- Royal Danish Naval Museum website for all warships attributed to a named shipbuilder. From the website follow Database > Avancerede > Set Konstructør to Benstrup > Søg (This works only if the language is set to Danish). For particular types of ships, follow the same path, but set the filter accordingly.
- Royal Danish Naval Museum - List of Danish Warships
- Royal Danish Naval Museum - Skibregister for individual ship's record cards where they exist.
- Topsøe-Jensen Th.: Knud Benstrup in Danish Biographical Leksikon, 3. edition, Gyldendal 1979-84. accessed 27 August 2019
