= Ulrik Christian Kaas =

Danish Nobleman and Naval Officer

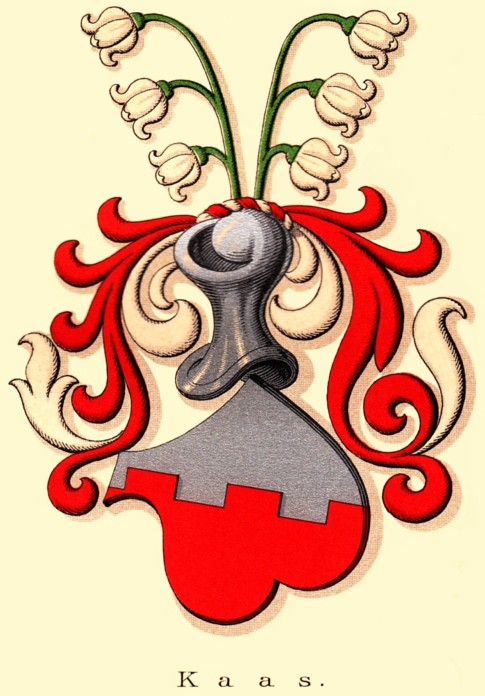
- Coat of arms of Kaas-af-Mur (af Mur refers to the wall or battlement on the shield)
- Born: 21 April 1729; Copenhagen
- Died: 22 March 1808 (aged 78); Copenhagen
- Burial place: Holmens Kirke, Copenhagen
- Military career
- Allegiance: Denmark–Norway (1742-1808)
- Branch: (Denmark) Royal Dano-Norwegian Navy
- Service years: 1742-1808
- Rank: Admiral
- Awards: Order of the Dannebrog

Ulrik Christian Kaas (21 April 1729 – 22 March 1808) was a Danish naval officer who rose to the rank of admiral. (Note: Confusion appears to reign concerning portraits of the various Admirals Kaas. An unreferenced comment from Danish Wikipedia da:Ulrik Christian Kaas records that a portrait of Ulrik Christian is really one of his brother Frederik Christian (1727). A similar comment appears in the reference Rosenkamp below)

== Personal life ==
Ulrik Christian Kaas was born 21 April 1729 in Copenhagen, died 22 March 1808, also in Copenhagen. He was the son of Ulrich Kaas
On 6 October 1766 at Ormslev, near Aarhus, he married Frederikke Amalie Charisius, daughter of Councillor (konferensråd) Constantin August Charisius and whose sister Frederikke Amalie Charisius had married Ulrik Kaas' older brother, Frederik Christian Kaas in 1765.
In 1780 he was appointed chamberlain at the court and from 1781 to 1783 (Note: The reference "Projekt Runeberg" differs from the other references by two years in the year of his marriage, and by ten years in the year he was appointed Adjutant General) he was Adjutant General to the monarch . In 1801 he was awarded the Order of the Dannebrog

== Career ==
Ulrik Christian Kaas was enrolled as a cadet in 1742 age 13 years (the normal age for enrollment ). In 1746 he sailed with ship-of-the-line Sydermanland in the squadron commanded by Ulrik Adolph Danneskiold-Samsøe :da: to Algiers.

Commissioned as Junior Lieutenant in 1749, Kaas was again in North Africa from 1751 to 1753 - this time with the frigate Docquen, principally in Morocco. On 3 June 1753 he happened to be visiting the frigate Falster in the harbour of Safi when that ship caught fire. He stayed on board to help fight the fire, and managed to get a sail set, but the ship exploded with the loss of many of her crew (see List of shipwrecks in 1753 ) and Kaas was only rescued by cadet Hans Schiønnebøl at the last minute. 31 March 1755 brought promotion to Senior Lieutenant and orders to the frigate Christiansborg on a voyage to the West Indies, returning in 1756. In December 1758 Kaas was further promoted to Lieutenant Captain and served on the ship-of-the-line Fyen on convoy duties to and from the Mediterranean.

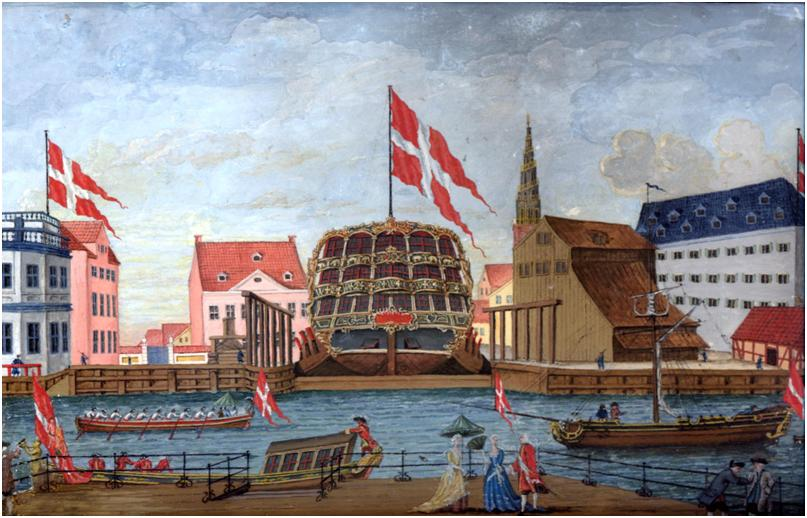
The Old Dry Dock

From April 1760 he was appointed interim supply officer for the dry dock at Christianshavn, Copenhagen, a position which may have continued even while he served in ships in home waters until 1765. In 1761 became second-in-command of the ship-of-the-line St Croix in the home squadron. In 1762 he captained the small sailing ship (hukkerten) Amager while she was acting as the watch ship in the Great Belt, and in 1763 was in command of the frigate Docquen on similar duties in Øresund. His promotion to full captain followed in August 1763 and two years in command of the cadet training ship Hvide Ørn.

From 3 September 1766 Ulrik Kaas was given leave of absence for a period which extended to five months for him to travel to Jutland, where he was to be married.

Promotion to commander came in March 1770 and with it the ship-of-the-line Mars which took part in the poorly planned expedition to Algiers. (Note: The expedition was commanded by Counter-Admiral Frederik Christian Kaas, but this was not Ulrik's brother of the same name. See hatnote above!) In escorting a convoy of Danish merchant ships from Port Mahon, the convoy called at Gibraltar to replenish water supplies and during the time in port a duel was fought between two officers of the Oldenborg regiment who were taking passage on his ship from Port Mahon. The survivor, one Captain Bezancene, fled over the border to Spain. Reports by Ulrik Kaas to Denmark on the poor condition of the ship received the response that he should forthwith return to the Mediterranean and inform Frederik Kaas. Mars, in company with Havfruen, was ordered back to Denmark in January 1772 but overwintered at Lisbon, eventually arriving in Danish waters at the end of May 1772. 1773 saw Kaas captaining the ship-of-the-line Ebenezer to the Baltic as part of the Danish home squadron. In 1776 he was an observer at the sea trials of the two frigates Kiel and Perlen

When on 11 May 1778 Commander Gerhard Christopher von Walterstorff took over as head of the naval base at Holmen head, Kaas became the Quartermaster General (ekvipagemester) at Nyholm in his place and at the same time admitted to membership of the Construction Committee.

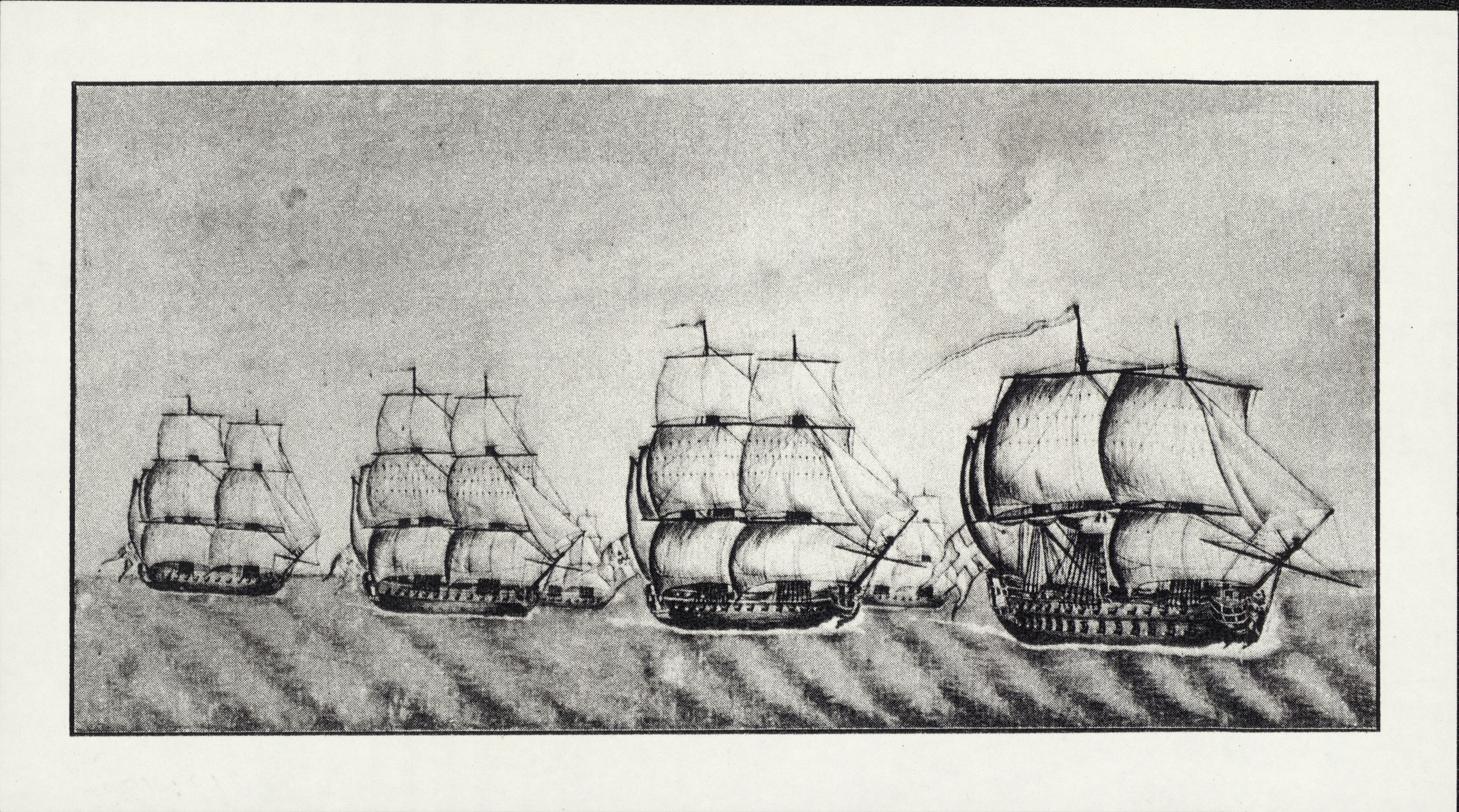
Holsteen escorting a convoy of three Chinamen and two East Indiamen back from the Cape of Good Hope.

In 1779 and 1780 Kaas captained Holsteen to the Cape of Good Hope to escort in convoy a number of homeward bound East India and Chinese trading ships, as well as carrying reinforcements for the Danish colonies in Guinea which had come into conflict with the Dutch. He reported from Lisbon on the outward voyage of severe storm damage and the loss of both fore mast and main mast. As the voyage continued 84 crew members were lost to scurvy and dysentery, which led (on his return to Denmark) to an investigation of Ulrik Kaas' management of the ship. Although Kaas was found blameless of mismanagement, the rations and treatment of the crews in the Royal Danish Navy improved noticeably. In the return from Cape Town, his crew's health restored, he convoyed a total of five merchant ships.

On the last day of 1781 Kaas was promoted to Commodore with some further commands at sea. In the Theatre War with Sweden, Kaas took command of the sea defences of the naval base at Copenhagen but left after a short period to his final posting as head of the Customs Service. Whilst in post at the Customs Service he achieved flag rank with promotion to counter admiral in 1790, vice admiral in 1797 and full admiral in 1804.

== Death ==
Ulrik Christian Kaas was still head of the Customs Service at the time of his death - 22 March 1808. He is buried in the chapel of the naval church in Copenhagen, Holmens Kirke.

== Citations (in Danish) ==
- Initially translated from the Danish Wikipedia da:Ulrik Christian Kaas, checked and augmented by the references cited
- Geni.com - Ulrik Christian Kaas af Mur
- Lex.dk - Dansk Biografisk Leksikon - Ulrik Christian Kaas
- Projekt Runeberg - Dansk Biografisk Lexikon - Ulrik Christian Kaas
- Rosenkamp -Dansk Biografisk Lexikon - Ulrik Christian Kaas
- T. A. Topsøe-Jensen og Emil Marquard (1935) “Officerer i den dansk-norske Søetat 1660-1814 og den danske Søetat 1814-1932“. Two volumes. Download here.
