= Rasmus Krag (1680–1755) =

Danish naval officer

Rasmus Krag (1680–1755) was a Danish naval officer who first became a junior lieutenant in 1700 and vice-admiral in 1736. He aspired to be a naval architect but his efforts proved unsatisfactory.

== Personal life ==
The son of a tailor, Rasmus Krag was born in Copenhagen about 1680 (or possibly 1677) (Note: The year of his birth is open to question. Two references give it as 1677, but his would mean Krag was 23 years old when he was first appointed as a junior lieutenant - unusually old for such an event. 1680 is more believable.)

== Early career ==
As a cadet in 1698 he served on a convoy with HDMS Hvide Falk to Portugal, and in 1699 to 1700 was in foreign service (which power not recorded), before being commissioned as a junior lieutenant on 30 January 1700. He later served on ships-of-the-line Prins Georg, and on promotion to senior lieutenant in 1703 in Prins Carl on the Danish royal tour of Norway.

In 1708 -1709 he served in the British Royal Navy. In his application to the Danish Admiralty to continue his studies abroad he vouchsafed that he had learnt much of mathematics and shipbuilding, under the patronage of U.C. Gyldenløve. From 1709 he captained steadily bigger ships and, was in command of the ship-of-the-line Nældebladet in the Battle of Køge Bay (1710), but complained in 1712 that he had been passed over for promotion before further promotion in 1713. Later in 1713, stationed in the Jutland town of Aabenraa to counter the smuggling of contraband, he was also in charge of the embarkation and repatriation of the Swedish troops under Stenbock after that country's defeat at the Siege of Tönning.

He served with admiral P Raben and took part in the Battle of Rügen (1715) in the continuing Great Northern War. In the same year he was on board HDMS Elephanten for which he became captain when this ship was Gyldenløve's flagship. 1717 Adjutant general to Admiral Raben. In 1720, Krag was sent to Marstrand to lead the raising and recovery of the Swedish warships sunk the previous year. Despite lack of skill, he had apparently managed to establish for himself good connections with leadership of the naval service. He was thus well connected with admiral C. Th. Sehested, who had had to leave the navy in 1718, but kept in touch with his old office.

== Ship building ==
Admiral Sehested had been critical of the French construction method used in the shipbuilding at Holmen, and in 1725 encouraged Krag to submit designs for a 72-gun ship characterised by the English construction to the much criticised fabrikmester Ole Judichær A further set of drawings was submitted in 1726 for a similar ship, recommended by Sehested, and approved. Krag was assigned the job of chief constructor for this ship. Plans for a 50-gun ship were also developed by Krag and submitted in 1727. A technical drawing which Krag. submitted to the king in 1728 of a furnace for steam treatment of timber was not well received by the Danish Admiralty. It quickly became apparent that Krag's knowledge of shipbuilding, in theory as well as in practice, was very limited. The 72-gun ship was completed as Printz Friderich, which turned out to be a mediocre ship, with such a weak longtitudinal structure that the keel breaking appeared fairly quickly after launch. This ship nevertheless was in commission for thirty years. (Note: Printz Friderich is the only ship attributed to Krag by the Royal Danish Naval Museum database)
In 1728, the construction of two ships according to Krag's drawings for a 50-gun ship was halted by the head of the naval dockyard of Holmen, as differences between the approved drawings and the model prepared from these were found. A team of engineering students, including Knud N. Benstrup, who had just returned from abroad, was asked to comment on Krag's designs. The considered opinion was very restrained but could not hide that the construction suffered from crucial weaknesses. Krag was then removed from the shipbuilding at Holmen.

== Later career ==
From 1728 to 1735 he captained several vessels. In 1735 he became a member of a commission to investigate dimensions of masts and round holes in naval ship construction, and was promoted to rear admiral and head of the Danish navy's second division – a promotion which took some by surprise. The following year he rose another degree and then sat on the commission to investigate a number of charges in the court martial of Knud Benstrup. In a minority of one, Krag here voted that Benstrup should receive the death penalty, which in view of the proportions of the case must be interpreted as an act of revenge on Krag's part.

Krag was characterized as an intriguing person with a dubious professional skill. He nevertheless managed to make influential connections and receive patronage, most importantly in his later career from Frederik Danneskiold-Samsøe under whom Krag served as squadron commander in 1746.

== Finale ==
After Frederik Danneskiold-Samsøe's fall from grace in 1746, Krag also left the service and retired at the end of that year to Slangerup northwest of Copenhagen, where he died on 6 October 1755.

== Citations ==
- (in Danish)Hans Christian Bjerg: Rasmus Krag in Dansk Biografisk Leksikon, 3 ed., Gyldendal 1979–84. accessed 7 February 2020
- "Rasmus Krag" (in Danish). Project Runeberg.
- (in Danish)T. A. Topsøe-Jensen og Emil Marquard (1935) “Officerer i den dansk-norske Søetat 1660-1814 og den danske Søetat 1814-1932 (PDF downloadable here (Feb 2020)).

== See also ==
- Danish Wikipedia article da:Rasmus Krag (søofficer)
- Danish Wikipedia article da:Frederik Danneskiold-Samsøe
