= HDMS Dronning Anna Sophia =

18th-century Danish–Norwegian ship

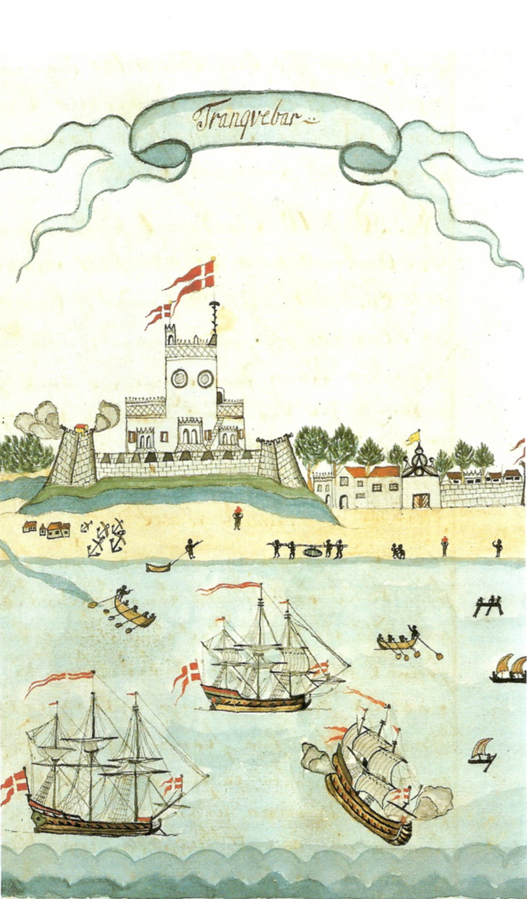
- Drawing from Niels Schmidt's diary from Dronning Anna Sopjias first expedition to India, dated 1723.

History

Denmark
- Name: Dronning Anna Sophia
- Launched: 1722
- Acquired: Danish East India Company

General characteristics
- Length: 170 ft (52 m)
- Beam: 45 ft (14 m)
- Draught: 20 ft 2 in (6.15 m)
- Complement: 663
- Armament: 90 guns

HDMS Dronning Anna Sophia was a ship-of-the-line designed by Ole Judichaer built at Nyholm, Copenhagen for the Royal Danish-Norwegian Navy. She spent the early part of her career in the service of the Danish East India Company, completing four expeditions to Tranquebar between 1722 and the early 1730s. She was decommissioned in 1752.

== Construction and design ==
Dronning Anna Sophia was constructed at Nyholm Dockyard to a design by Ole Judichær. She was launched in 1722.

She was 170 ft (52 m) long, with a beam of 45 ft (14 m) and a draught of 20 ft 2 in (6.15 m). Her complement was 663 men. Her armament was 90 to 86 guns.

== Career ==
In 1722, she was sold to the Danish East India Company. She completed four expeditions to Danish India. She was in Tranquebar in 1723.

Niels Hogmand was captain of the ship on the nenxt expedition in 1726. On the outbound journey, she ran a ground at Læsø but was able to continue, 1st Mate (overstyrmand) Niels Schmidt was on board the ship on the two first expeditions. His diary has survived. He completed a total of nine expeditions to Tranquebar. He would eventually go down with the Vendela.

The Danish East India Company in 1729. On 21 October, Diderich Miihlenfort was appointed as the new governor of Danish India (unlike the earlier governors whom the D.E.I.C. appointed). In November 1829, he departed from Copenhagen on board the Dronning Anna Sophia. On 22 January 1730, she called at Porto Praya, whose governor paid the ship a visit on 24 January. On 8 August, she reached Yranquebar. Former governor Morten Mortensen Færoe returned to Copenhagen on board the ship 1724.
