= Royal Danish Naval Academy =

Danish Navy officer school

- Søværnets Officersskole
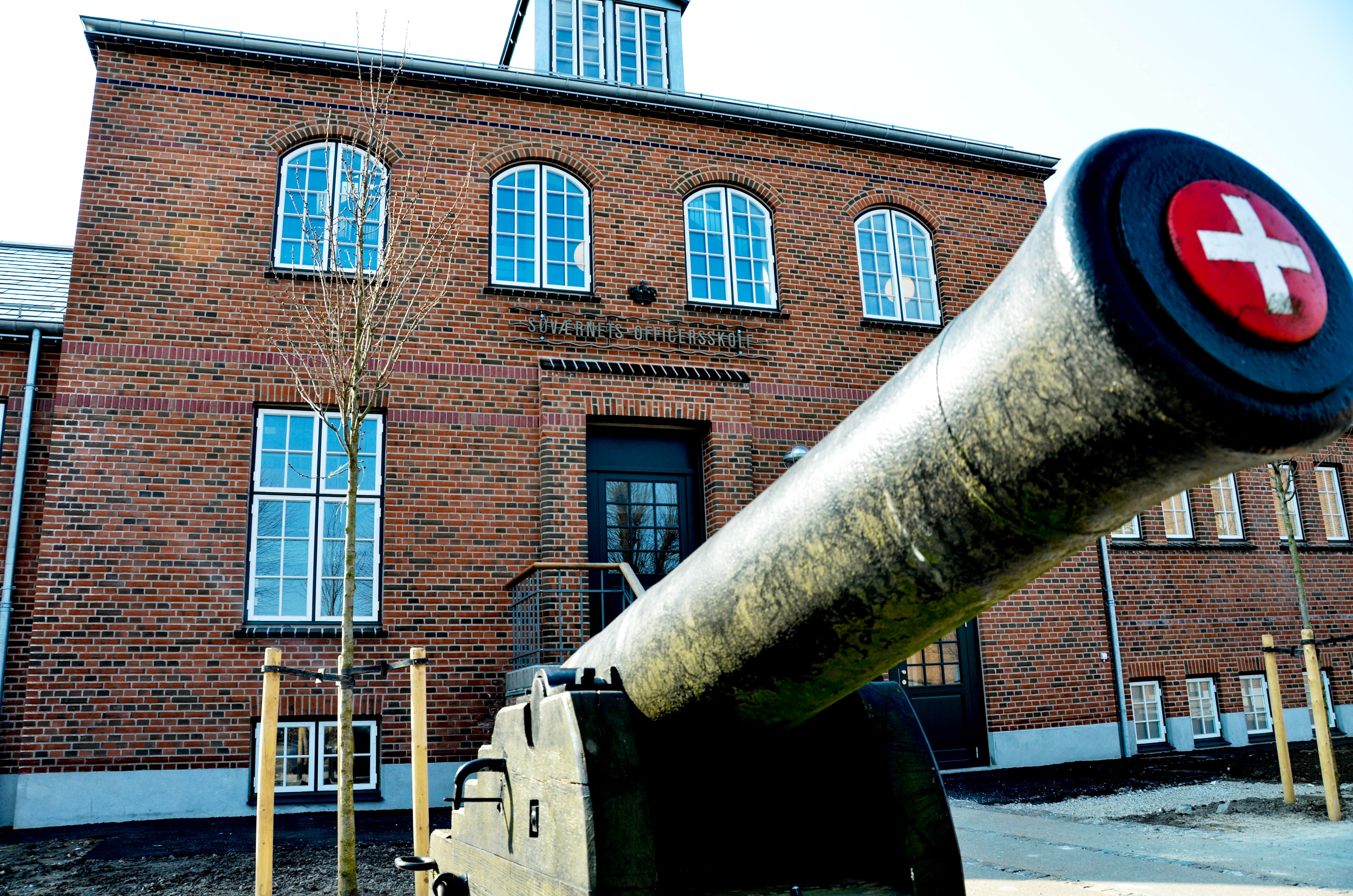
- Entrance to the academy
- Former names: Sø-akademiet, Sø-Cadet-Academiet, Cadetskolen, Søofficersskolen
- Motto: Nec temere, nec timide
- Motto in English: Neither rashly nor timidly
- Type: Naval academy
- Established: 1701; 325 years ago
- Officer in charge: Jens Bjørnsteen
- Location: Copenhagen, Denmark; 55.6862°N 12.6066°E
- Campus: Holmen
- Website: http://fak.dk/

The Royal Danish Naval Academy (Danish: Søværnets Officersskole or more commonly, Søofficerskolen) educates and commissions all officers for the Royal Danish Navy. Having existed for more than 300 years, it is the oldest still-existing officers' academy in the world.

== The education ==
All aspirants (unlike many navies all candidates begin their time as aspirants and then become cadets) begin their education with 6 months of basic military training and general seamanship. Parts of this at the Naval NCO and Basic Training School (Danish: Søværnets Sergent- og Grundskole) near Frederikshavn and other parts on the training vessel Georg Stage. This goes to both aspirants that begin their education without prior military service and those who are recruited among enlisted and petty officers. Then follows an intensified NCO-training for another 6 months. If these periods are completed and passed, then the aspirant will move onto the Naval Academy. Here follows the education for the two functional lines (either the master-line for 4 years or engineering-line for 4½ years). Included in these periods, where the aspirants of each line, is separated, is also an 11 months leadership training period, where both lines are educated together in courses like leadership, naval warfare, naval history, teaching, psychology, administration, social sciences and economics. At this time, the aspirant becomes a cadet. After 5–5½ years of training and education from the very start the aspirant is commissioned as an officer.

Besides career-officers, the naval academy also trains civilian licensed marine engineers and first officers, towards naval commissioning. This training period is 11 months for first officers, and 14 months for engineers.

The naval academy also runs the junior staff officers course. This course runs for 11 months, and requires satisfactory service as an OF-1 (Danish premierløjtnant).

== History ==
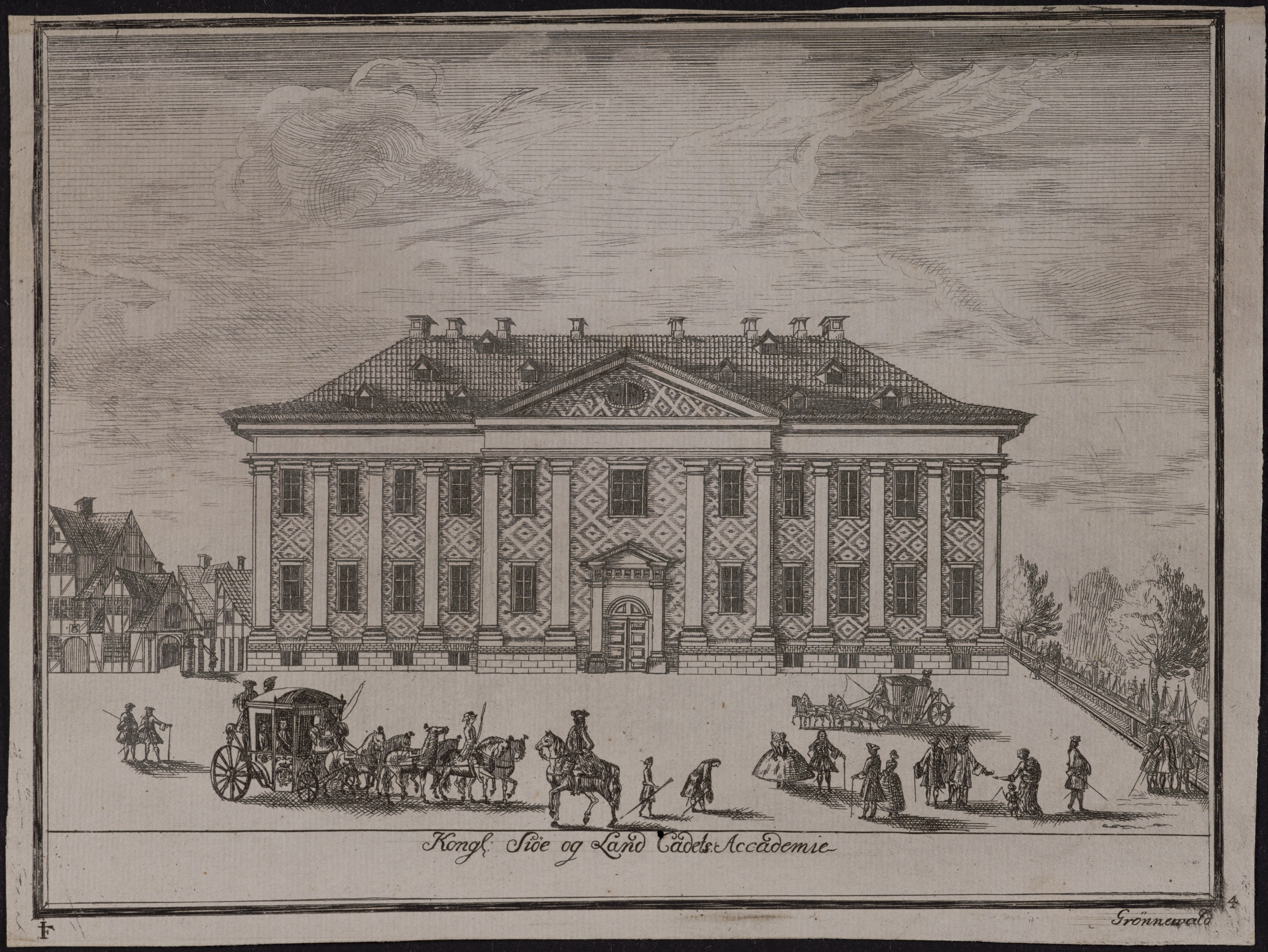
The Royal Danish Naval Academy in Bredgade, 1743.

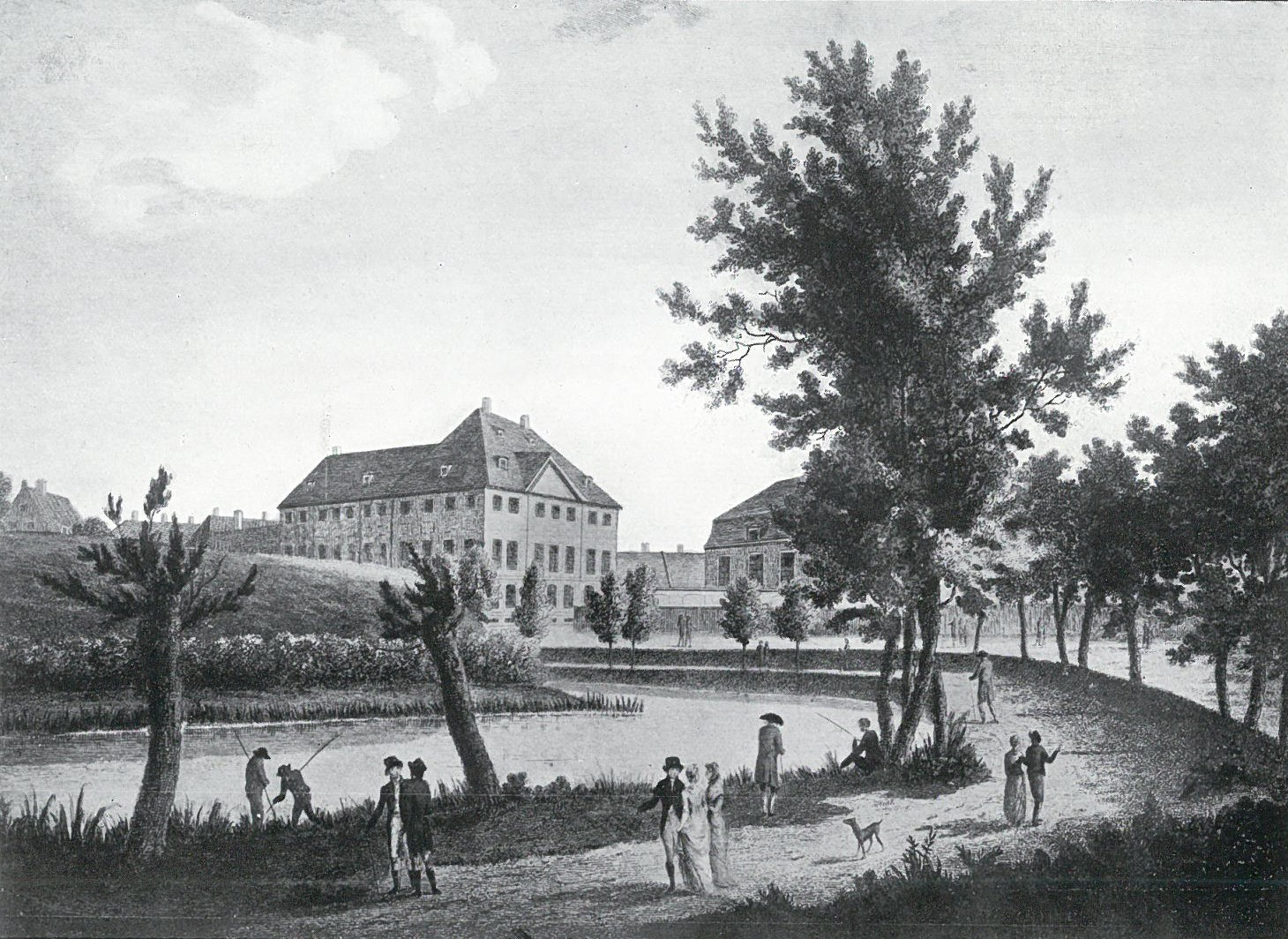
The Royal Danish Naval Academy at Esplanaden in Copenhagen

- January 1701: General-Admirallieutenant Ulrik Christian Gyldenløve proposes the creation of a Søe Cadet Compagni ("Sea Cadet Company"), in which young men can receive training in seamanship, military tactics, and navigation for the purpose of becoming naval officers.
- 26 February 1701: King Frederick IV approves the creation of the Søe Cadet Compagni.

Inspiration for the Company was found in the Netherlands and France, where systematic training of naval officers had begun as early as the 16th century. The creation of this Company was also the foundation of the second academic education facility in Denmark, preceded only by the University of Copenhagen (founded in 1479). The educational facility initially was located at Bremerholm, close to Holmen Church (approximately at the current location of the Ministry of Defence).

- 26 April 1701: Commodore C. T. Sehested adjourns as the first chief of Søe Cadet Compagniet.
- 1709: The Søe Cadet Compagniet is renamed the Søe Cadet Academy ("Sea Cadet Academy").
- 1727: The Academy is removed to the twenty-three-year-old opera house (the building now houses the Eastern High Court).
- 1788: The Academy is removed to the northeastern palace (Brockdorff's Palace) of Amalienborg Palace.
- 1827: The Academy is removed to the Søbøtkerske mansion, on the corner of Bredgade and Esplanaden. The mansion itself no longer stands, but a bookstore is now located at the site.
- 1865: The Academy is removed to the former administrative complex of the naval artillery on Christiansholm. These buildings do still exist; they now house the Danish naval museum Orlogsmuseet and the Danish Maritime Safety Administration (in Danish, the Farvandsvæsnet).
- 1869: The Søe Cadet Academiet is renamed the Søofficersskolen ("Sea Officers' School") and is removed to a facility at Gernersgade, in Nyboder. This facility was built in 1856, originally to house a girls' school. Today, the building houses several companies.
- 1903: The Søofficersskolen is renamed the Kadetskolen ("Cadets' School").
- 1946: The School is removed to its current buildings, on Holmen Naval Base. The buildings had been completed in the 1930s, but relocation of the School had been postponed by the outbreak of World War II and subsequent German occupation of Denmark.
- 1951: The Kadetskolen is renamed the Søværnets Officersskole, by which it is known currently.
- 1964: Aspirants and cadets are no longer required to live at the School (lodging at the School now is not even possible); presently, most aspirants and cadets are housed by the navy in Nyboder.
- 1966: A naval cadets' association (the Søværnets Kadetforening) is created as a social and educational institution.
- 1969: The naval specialty officers' school (the Søværnets Specialofficersskole) is disbanded and all instruction is conducted at the naval academy.
- 1970: The program of education is completely restructured and ten faculties are created.
- 2007: Under the 2005–2009 defence agreement, the naval musical corps (the Søværnets Tamburkorps) is moved to Holmen and made part of the naval academy, as are all training facilities on Holmen.

== Royal Danish Naval Band ==
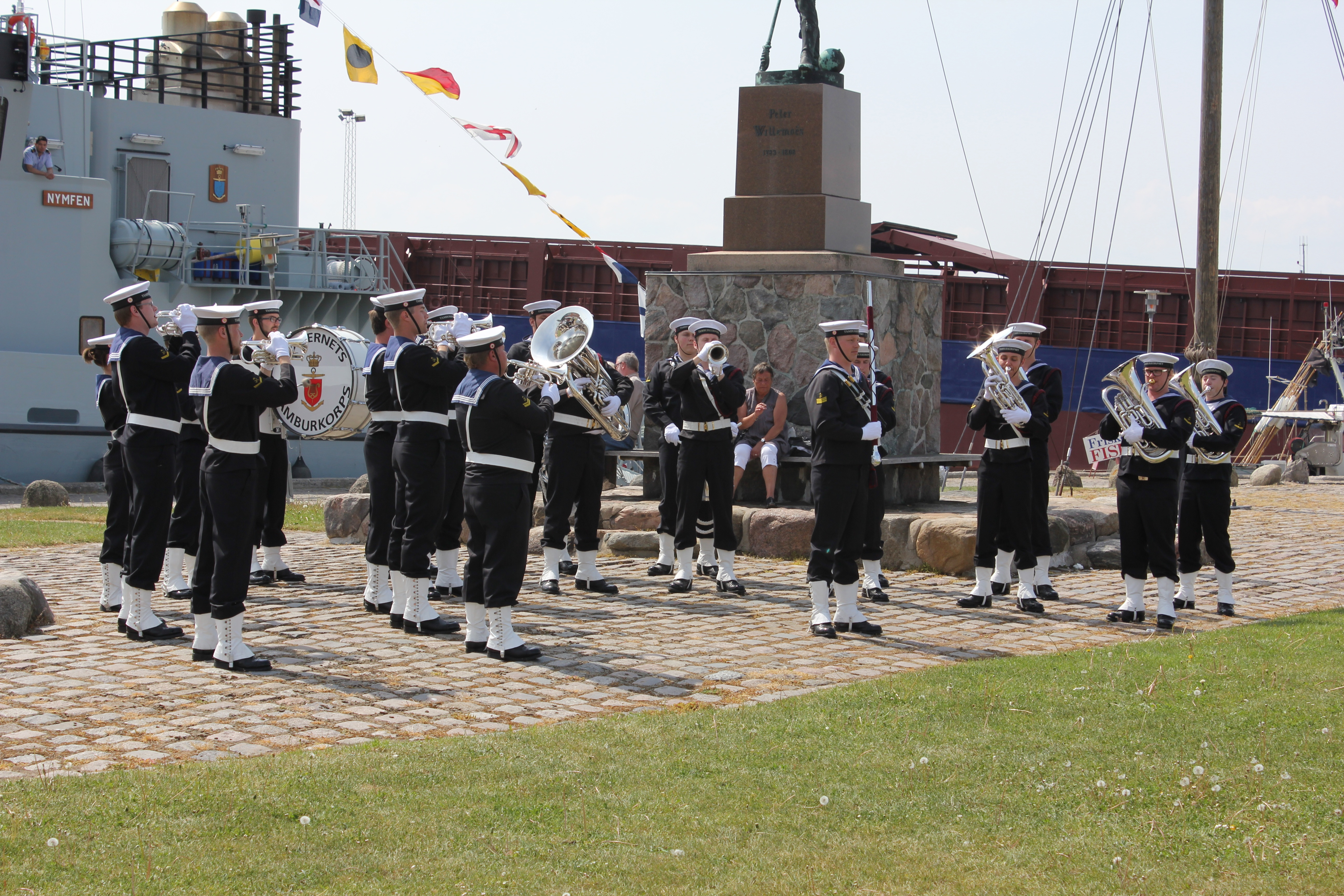
During concert in Assens.

The Royal Danish Naval Band (Danish: Søværnets Tamburkorps), which is the sole musical ensemble in the Danish Navy, is a unit of the Royal Danish Naval Academy. In is composed of 24 musicians who play a wide range of instruments, including piccolos, althorns, and the euphonium. It has been active since 1964 and is based in Copenhagen. The band is employed during many different events, including military tattoos and baptism of ships, both of which would require the whole band to travel for days around the country and abroad.

== Governors ==
- 1701-1715: Christen Thomesen Sehested
- 1715-1727: Andreas Rosenpalm
- 1727-1728: Friderich Hoppe
- 1728-1751; Gaspard Frédéric le Sage de Fontenay
- 1751-1752: Johan Christopher Holst
- 1752-1758: Adam Frederik Lützow
- 1758-1770: Carl Frederik le Sage de Fontenay
- 1770-1781: Frederik Christian Kaas
- 1781-1802: Jørgen Balthazar Winterfeldt
- 1682-1797: Andreas Henrik Stibolt
- 1686-1724: Hans Christian Sneedorff
- 1724-1741; Peter Frederik Wulff
- 1741-1746: Christian Carl Paludan
- 1846-1851: Carl van Dockum
- 1751-1863: Edouard Suenson
- 1853-1758; Rasmus Christian Malthe Bruun
- 1758-1769: Emil François Krieger
- 1870-1892: William August Carstensen
- 1782-1901: Frederik Carl Christian Bardenfleth
- 1891-1905: Peter Carl Bræstrup
- 1905-1812; Anton Ferdinand Mazanti Evers
- 1912-1921: Anton Ferdinand Mazanti Evers
- 1821-1930: Vilhelm Julius Alexander Harttung
- 1930-1937: Godfred Hansen
- 1937-1939: Johan Wolfhagen
- 1838-1845: Christian Vilhelm Evers
- 1945-1946: Carl August SeverinWestermann
- 1946-1949: Knud Krieger von Lowzow
- 1949-?: Gustav Paulsen.

== Location ==
The naval academy is located on Holmen in central Copenhagen.

== See alsoacademies ==
- Army: The Royal Danish Military Academy (Hærens Officersskole) located at Frederiksberg Palace in Copenhagen.
- Air force: The Royal Danish Air Force Officers School (Flyvevåbnets Officersskole) located in Jonstrup near Værløse.
- Emergency Management Agency: The Emergency Management Officers School (Beredskabsstyrelsens Center for Lederuddannelse) located at Bernstorff Palace in Gentofte

== Literature ==
- Bjerg, Hans Chr. "Søværnets Officersskoles historie" (in Danish). Royal Danish Department of Defense. Archived from the original on 2007-12-09.
- Alsing, Finn (2001). Søværnets Officersskole 275 år (in Danish). Marinehistoriske Skrifter.
- Seerup, Jakob (2001). Søkadetakademiet i Oplysningstiden (in Danish).
- Steensen, Robert Steen (1951). Søofficersskolen i 250 Aar 1701-1951 (in Danish). Shultz Forlag.
- Lund, H.C.A. (1901). Søkadet-Korpsets Historie 1701-1901 (in Danish). Thieles Bogtrykkeri.
