= Danish shipbuilders =

This list of Danish shipbuilders, arranged by year, presents builders of Danish warships from the late 17th century to mid-19th century. It names the Heads of Naval Construction (Fabrikmester) and includes lesser shipbuilders to the Danish Royal Navy. It does not include purely commercial shipbuilders.

== List of shipbuilders ==
Before 1673

Rubbens (senior and junior) built HDMS Sophia Amalia launched in 1650 in Christiana (Oslo).

1673–1739

- Thies Hermansen v.d. Borgh: credited with only one ship viz Christianus Quintus (1673), a ship-of-the-line
- Schøits credited with the building of the frigate Ørnen, sometimes called Sorte Ørn (the black eagle), launched in 1694
- Francis Sheldon Tree Löver (1689) and Nordstiernen (1703) both ships-of-the-line
- Henrik Span e.g. Dannebroge (1692) and Dronning Lovisa (1695): both ships-of-the-line
- Ole Judichær 1692–1727 e.g. Fridericus Quartus (1699): ship-of-the-line . He was sacked after a court martial in 1727.
- Rasmus Krag 1726–1730. Printz Friderich (1727)
- Knud Benstrup 1729–1738 Fabrikmester court martialed and imprisoned Also da:Knud Nielsen Benstrup
- Lauritz Bragenæs (1729) appointed Fabrikmester with Benstrup, but died same year.
- Diderich de Thurah 1738–1758 (see da:Diderich de Thurah) studied with, and worked under, Knud Benstrup. He conspired against Benstrup, but proved an unworthy successor as Fabrikmester. He was also an artist and translator of religious texts.

1739–1810

- Formation of the Construction Committee in 1739 (see below)
- C. F. Petersen 1740
- M. Thomas Snellgrove 1740 two barges (possible English connection)
- Laurent Barbé 1740–1747 effectively Fabrikmester while Thurah held this office.
- Andreas Gerner (Note: In the Royal Danish Naval Museum database a few ships are attributed to "A Gerner". Many more are attributed to his son "Henrik Gerner". Some ships are attributed only to "Gerner" - most of these are Henrik's, but any launched before 1772 would probably be Andreas's.) e.g. Fyen (1746) ship-of-the-line
- Povel Brock 1742–1753 ten gunboats, one barge and one trading ship.
- P. Kiønig 1743–1759 six trading ships, five gunboats, one barge and (possibly) two frigates.
- A. Eskildsen e.g. Fortuna (1743) two or three masted vessel
- A. Turesen e.g. Christiansborg (1746) frigate; Ebenetzer (1757): ship-of-the-line
- Frederik Michael Krabbe Fabrikmester
- Gad one brig Postillionen (1770) and one trading ship.
- Henrik Gerner 1772–1787 Fabrikmester
- Erich Eskildsen – unnamed (1776) armed trading ships
- C. Høyer e.g.Cron Prindcesse Lovisa Augusta (1782) trading ship
- I. Halkier 1781–1793 Friderichsdahl (1781) trading ship, Friderichsort (1793) gunboat
- Ernst Wilhelm Stibolt 1788–1796 Fabrikmester
- Frantz Hohlenberg 1796–1803 Fabrikmester

1804 and later

- Position of Fabrikmester unfilled 1804–1810
- P. Eskildsen - No 5 gunboat (1805) and No 1 (1810) schooner
- Larsen - the five gunboats Frederikssund, Helsingør, Næstved, Roeskilde, & Saltholmen built in 1805 and 1806. Only Næstved survived the Battle of Copenhagen (1807)
- Dahlman e.g. Corsøer (1805) and Dragøe (1806), and six other gunboats
- S. Halkier 1808 two barges
- Chapman 1808–1810 eleven gunboats for Denmark.
- Sørensen 1808 (possibly two of the same name)
- Jens Jørgen Pihl 1810–1814 Fabrikmester (No personal data found) e.g. Atalante (1811) trading ship; Frederiksværn (1814) brig
- Andreas Schifter 1814–1843 Fabrikmester and Vice Admiral
- Grove 1838–1844
- Madsen (undated) One small boat only attributed

Steam

From 1824 to 1830 ten steam-powered warships entered service.
See Orlogsværftet for history after 1830.

== Construction Committee ==
In Danish Konstruktionskommissionen

Prior to 1739 all warship design in the Danish Naval dockyards at Holmen, Copenhagen, required royal approval. Shipbuilding was considered an art rather than a science.

Part of the committee's remit was to ensure the proper education of promising young naval officers in all aspects of ship construction and, to this end, the commission would send officers on extended study tours to the other naval powers of Europe to learn not only of recent advances in ship building but also harbour design and maintenance, defence works, dykes, and flood management. Other scientific advances, mechanical and technical inventions not directly related to naval matters were also noted - occasionally, a little espionage was required.
In 1742 the Royal Danish Academy of Sciences was established in Copenhagen to which the educated officer corps of the Danish navy contributed much useful debate.

Apprentice ship builders would return from their foreign tours often to become members of the Construction Committee and to lecture at the Sea Cadet Academy on shipbuilding. Some would eventually become the head of naval construction, Fabrikmester, a position which required not only professional expertise but also political and personal qualities of leadership. Criticism on grounds of seaworthiness or cost of the designs, or loss of political support made the position of Fabrikmester very stressful for some of the incumbents.
