= Nicolai Wichmann =

Nicolai Qichmann (died October 1729) was a Danish portrait painter.

== Biography ==
Nothing is known about Wichmann's early life and background. He is first mentioned in 1700 when he served as godfather for koiner Jochum Wichmann's child. In 1701m he painted a portrait of Frederick IV. In 1693, he was appointed as court painter to Queen Louise. He kept this title after the queen's death and the king's controversial marriage to Anna Sophie Reventlow. His portraits of bishop Henrik Bornemann and pastor Ivar Brinck were reproduced as ciooerokate engravings.

In c. 1701, he married to Sara Jensdatter Foght (c. 1675-1757). Ge was the father of painter Peter Wichmann.

== Gallery ==
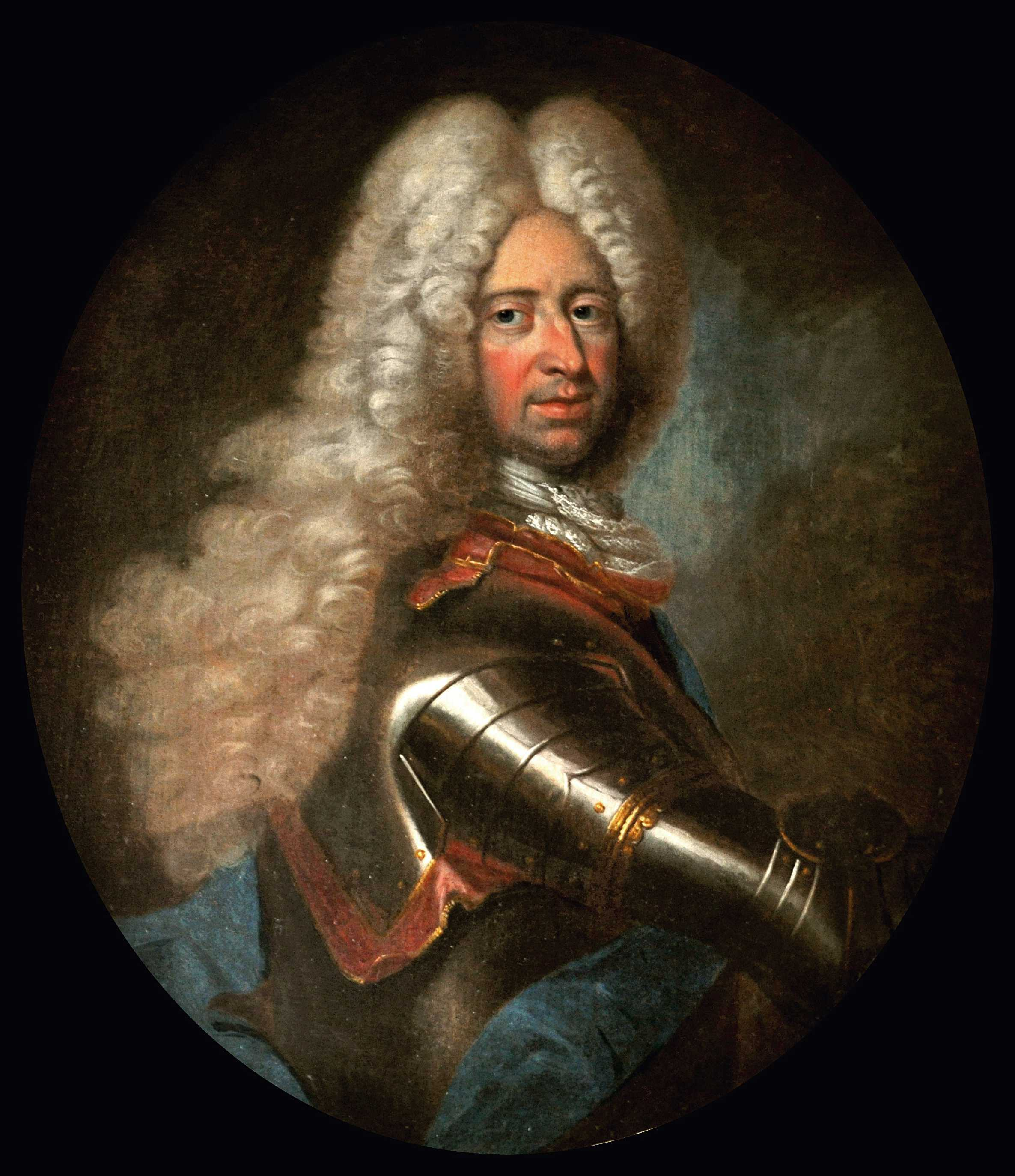
Conrad Reventlow.

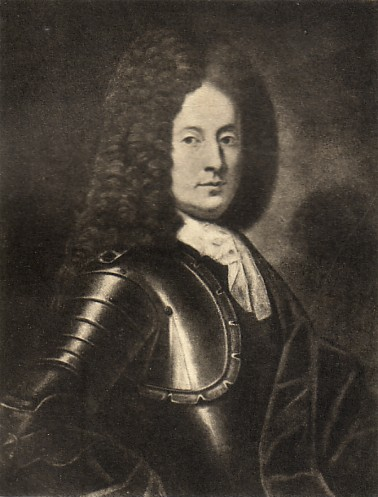
Ulrich Kaas (c. 1715)

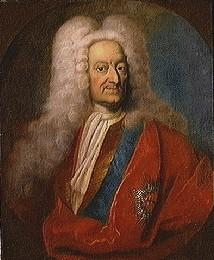
Christian von Lente (c. 1720).

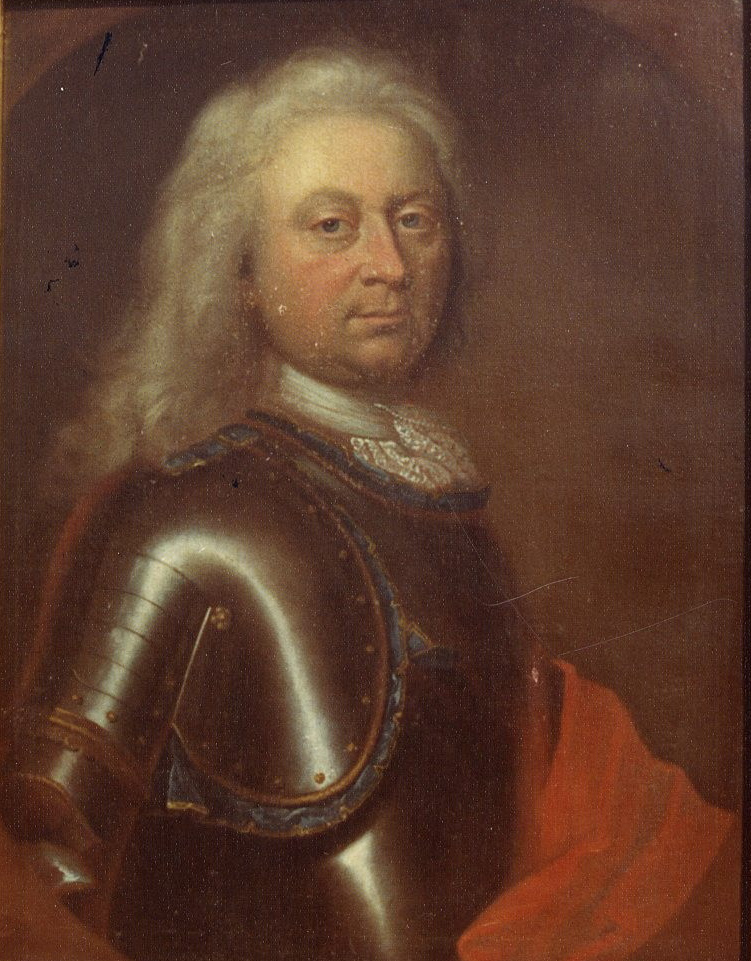
Hans Brockenhuus von Løvenhjelm

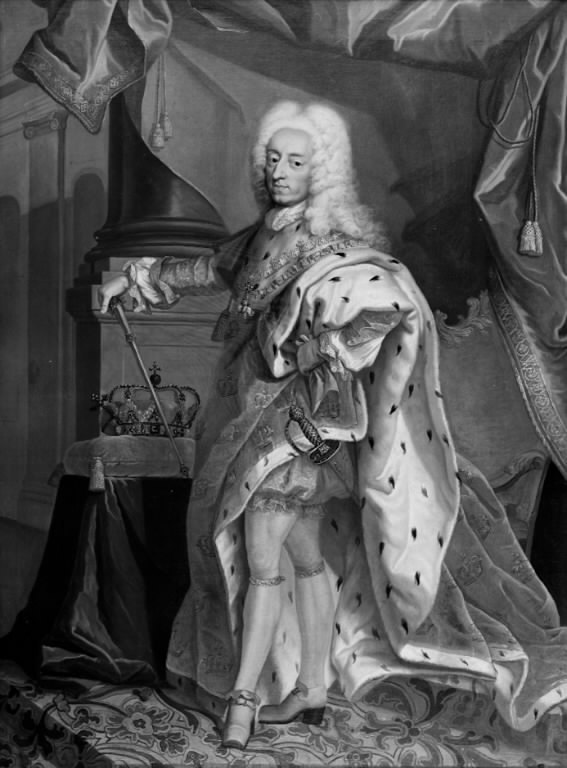
Frederick IV.
