= HDMS Christianus Sixtus =

18th c. Danish ship-of-the-line

History

Denmark-Norway
- Builder: Benstrup at Nyholm, Copenhagen
- Laid down: 20 May 1732
- Launched: 7 December 1733
- Decommissioned: 1769

General characteristics
- Class & type: Three deck Ship-of-the-line and fleet flagship
- Length: 180 ft
- Beam: 48 ft
- Draught: 19 ft 10 in (fore); 21 ft 8 in (aft)
- Propulsion: sail
- Armament: 90 cannon – 36 pdr. in the main battery
- Notes: Caveat - Danish measurements may be slightly different from UK Imperial units

HDMS Christianus Sixtus (1733) was a three-deck 90-gun ship-of-the-line, designed to be the flagship of the Danish fleet, and was named after the monarch of the time, King Christian VI

== The ship's history ==
Designed by K N Benstrup in his role as senior fabrikmester, and built and launched in Copenhagen, the ship was immediately a source of contention as she drew a greater depth (by some six inches) than planned. This was due to the use of poorly seasoned timber which was thus heavier than calculated. As much of Danish naval strategy was planned for the relatively shallower waters of the Kattegat and Great Belt, compared with the deeper North Sea and Baltic, this could be a problem.

The controversy grew as blame was directed at Benstrup, while other senior officers displayed their animosities and conspired to court-martial the designer. (Note: See Knud Nielsen Benstrup for the commission of inquiry and court martial)

As an expensive capital ship, Christian Sextus appears never to have actually left harbour, and was fully commissioned only once in her 35 years of life. This was in 1743 when there was a question over succession to the Swedish throne.

== Citations ==
- Nielsen E. - Danish Military History website - Major Danish Warships Built at the Holmen Shipyard 1692-1744
- Royal Danish Naval Museum - Christianus Sixtus - for original plans click "vis" on this link.
- Royal Danish Naval Museum - List of Danish Warships
- Topsøe-Jensen Th.: Knud Benstrup in Danish Biographical Leksikon, 3. edition, Gyldendal 1979-84. accessed 27 August 2019
