= Ulrich Kaas =

Royal Dano-Norwegian Navy officer

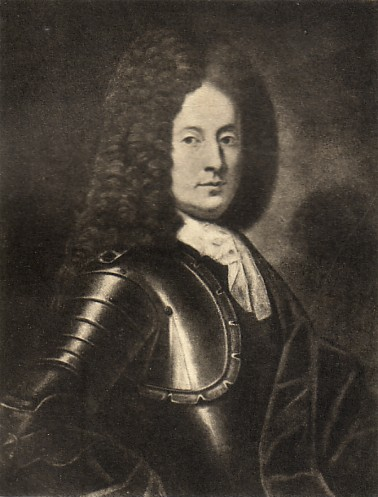
- Kaas painted by Nicolai Wichmann.
- Born: 4 October 1677 (Note: Of the references consulted, most give only the year of his birth. Projekt Runeberg gives "Summer 1677". Only Lex DBL gives an actual date); Veile
- Died: 28 December 1746 (aged 69); Sandvigsgaard, Hillerød
- Burial place: Nørre Herlev, Hillerød
- Military career
- Allegiance: Denmark–Norway (1690-1746)
- Branch: (Denmark) Royal Dano-Norwegian Navy
- Service years: 1690–1732
- Rank: Admiral
- Conflicts: Great Northern War

Admiral Ulrich Jørgensen Kaas (4 October 1677 – 28 December 1746) was a Royal Dano-Norwegian Navy officer. He rose to the rank of rear admiral in the Great Northern War and later to admiral in 1732. Following a power struggle within the Danish admiralty, he left the naval service for a senior post in Bergen.

== Personal life ==
Ulrich Kaas was born in 1677 near Vejle, where his father, Jørgen Grubbe Kaas, was chief administrator. His mother was Birgitte Sophie Maltesdatter née Sehested, who brought with her into the family at marriage the ownership of the estate of Ølufgaard, some nine kilometers south of Varde. Ulrich Kaas took over this estate from 1719.

Kaas was first married in 1715, to Cathrine Sophie Rubring. By this marriage, he became brother-in-law to Admiral Peter Raben who was married to his new wife's sister, Elena Marie Rubring and in whose house the marriage ceremony took place.
His first wife died in 1724 and Kaas remarried in 1726 to Mette Sørensdatter Mathiesen. Five of his sons became Danish naval officers. (Note: By his first marriage:Jørgen Grubbe (born 1716) and Malta (born 1721) : By his second marriage Frederik Christian (born 1727) and Ulrik Christian Kaas (born 1729) who each became admirals in their own right, and Frederick (born 1730))

== Naval career ==
After five years as a cadet, Ulrich Kaas sailed with HDMS Nellebladet (Captain Ivar Hvitfeldt) in 1695, escorting a convoy to France, and continued on to the Mediterranean. Later the same year, he was permitted to go into foreign service and served for five years in the Dutch navy, starting as an ordinary seaman learning his trade on warships, privateers and merchant ships. In November 1699, he returned to Denmark as a senior lieutenant, and was promoted to lieutenant-captain in January 1700.
Over the next ten years, Ulrich Kaas served in a number of Danish ships of the line (Prins Carl, Prins Wilhelm, Elephanten and as captain of Slesvig) with an intervening spell as recruiting officer in Jutland.

Early in 1710 Ulrich Kaas was in Holland, recruiting seamen for the Danish navy. He reported in March of that year that, by Dutch regulations, he was not officially allowed to actively recruit, but the authorities would quietly turn a blind eye to volunteers being enlisted.
Back in Denmark, Kaas was appointed captain of the ship-of-the-line Prins Carl shortly before that ship saw action in the Battle of Køge Bay. In 1711 he was back in Holland again, recruiting volunteers. Recalled to captain the ship-of-the-line Mars, by the end of 1711 he was promoted to the rank of commodore and as captain of Tre Løver was involved in the battles of 28–30 September 1712 off Pomerania near Rügen.

In 1713 and 1714, Kaas was captain of Prins Christian, and then in 1715 Havfruen when Admiral Raben's fleet saw action at the Battle of Rügen on 8 August. In October 1715 he was flag captain to Admiral Gyldenløve on Elephanten for three weeks before he was promoted to rear admiral.

For the remainder of 1715, and for 1716, Ulrich Kaas commanded a squadron from the flagship Wenden tasked with maintaining the winter blockade of the Swedes in Stralsund and keeping the Baltic Sea free of the enemy, but in the spring of 1716, in fog, he was suddenly faced with an overwhelming Swedish force under Vice-Admiral Wüster. He withdrew his squadron to the safety of Øresund, exhibiting great professionalism in navigating the treacherous waters off Falsterbo until the Swedish fleet retired from the scene. He then returned to blockade Stralsund in June 1716. Later in 1716 he captained the ship of the line Sophia Hedevig, named after the Danish princess.

1717 saw Kaas with his flagship Beskærmeren as part of Admiral Gyldenløve's fleet, and later that year in command of a lesser squadron in Køge Bugt with the flagship Prins Christian. On 19 February 1718 he was promoted to vice admiral and commanded a squadron of Admiral Raben's fleet from Justitia. From 1719 to 1726, he specialised as head of recruitment in Jutland, Schleswig and Holstein, which was not without incident. In January 1724, during a recruiting exercise in the north of Jutland, Kaas' lodgings in the customs house in Skagen were struck by lightning and caught fire. The house was totally destroyed, but Ulrich Kaas and his servant were rescued at the last minute, all their belongings having been engulfed in the flames. Compensation for his losses was claimed. and full restitution made.

== Fire and retirement ==
Almost five years later, in 1728, Kaas' residence in Copenhagen was also destroyed by fire. (This may have been in the Copenhagen Fire of 1728 of 20–23 October, as he was seeking official help on 9 November) He and his family lost their house, clothes, and all their winter stores. His household staff were also made homeless. As part of the emergency measures put in place, three of his sons were instantly confirmed as cadets in the Danish navy. In consequence of his great losses in the fire, he received an advance on his salary from the Admiralty so that rebuilding of his property could commence in 1729.

About March 1729, just six months after the major fire, the architect Johan Cornelius Krieger established a brick works and also, in partnership with Kaas, a lime kiln and a sawmill in the Christianshavn district of Copenhagen

Early in 1732 a power struggle within the Danish admiralty came to a head. On 20 February 1732, Ulrich Kaas was promoted to full admiral, a symbolic gesture five days before he retired from naval service. His final salary was withheld until his creditors could all be satisfied.

On leaving the admiralty, Kaas took up a senior administrative post with the district of Bergen where he also had responsibilities to the diocese of Bergen. (Note: The position of Stiftmand or Diocesan Clerk is described on Danish Wikipedia, as an acceptable method in the eighteenth century of sacking politicians and others who had been outmanouvered by their superiors and removing them from Copenhagen!)

== Retirement and death ==
In 1737 he retired from his Bergen posts to his estate at Sandviggaard, (Note: Possession of Sandviggaard came to Ulrich Kaas with his second marriage, when he married Mette Matthiessen in 1726. The estate effectively disappeared in 1943 with the building of Hillerød hospital - today only a road leading to the hospital bears the name Sandviggårdsvej.) He lived at Hillerød with declining health (he suffered from kidney stones). It is assumed he suffered from financial problems during his retirement as he was forced to sell his estate at Ølufgaard by auction in 1741.

Ulrich Kaas died on 28 December 1746. He was buried in the churchyard at Nørre Herlev in North Zealand.

== Citations ==
- partially translated from the Danish Wikipedia article da:Ulrik Kaas
- Danish Estates website
- (in Danish)Eremit.dk website presenting an exact copy of the original text from Bruun, Carl - Kjøbenhavn part II chapter VI : published by Thiele, Copenhagen 1890
- (in Danish)geni.com - Ulrich Jørgensen Kaas
- (in Danish)Gravsted website
- (in Danish)Lex.dk - Dansk Biografisk Leksikon - Ulrik Kaas
- (in Danish)Projekt Runeberg - Danish Biographical Lexicon - Vol IX page 71
- (in Danish)Salmonsen konversationsleksikon 2 Ed. Vol XIII p 339
- (in Danish)T. A. Topsøe-Jensen og Emil Marquard (1935) “Officerer i den dansk-norske Søetat 1660-1814 og den danske Søetat 1814-1932“. Two volumes. Download here.
