= Frederik Christian Kaas (1727–1804) =

Danish naval officer and landowner

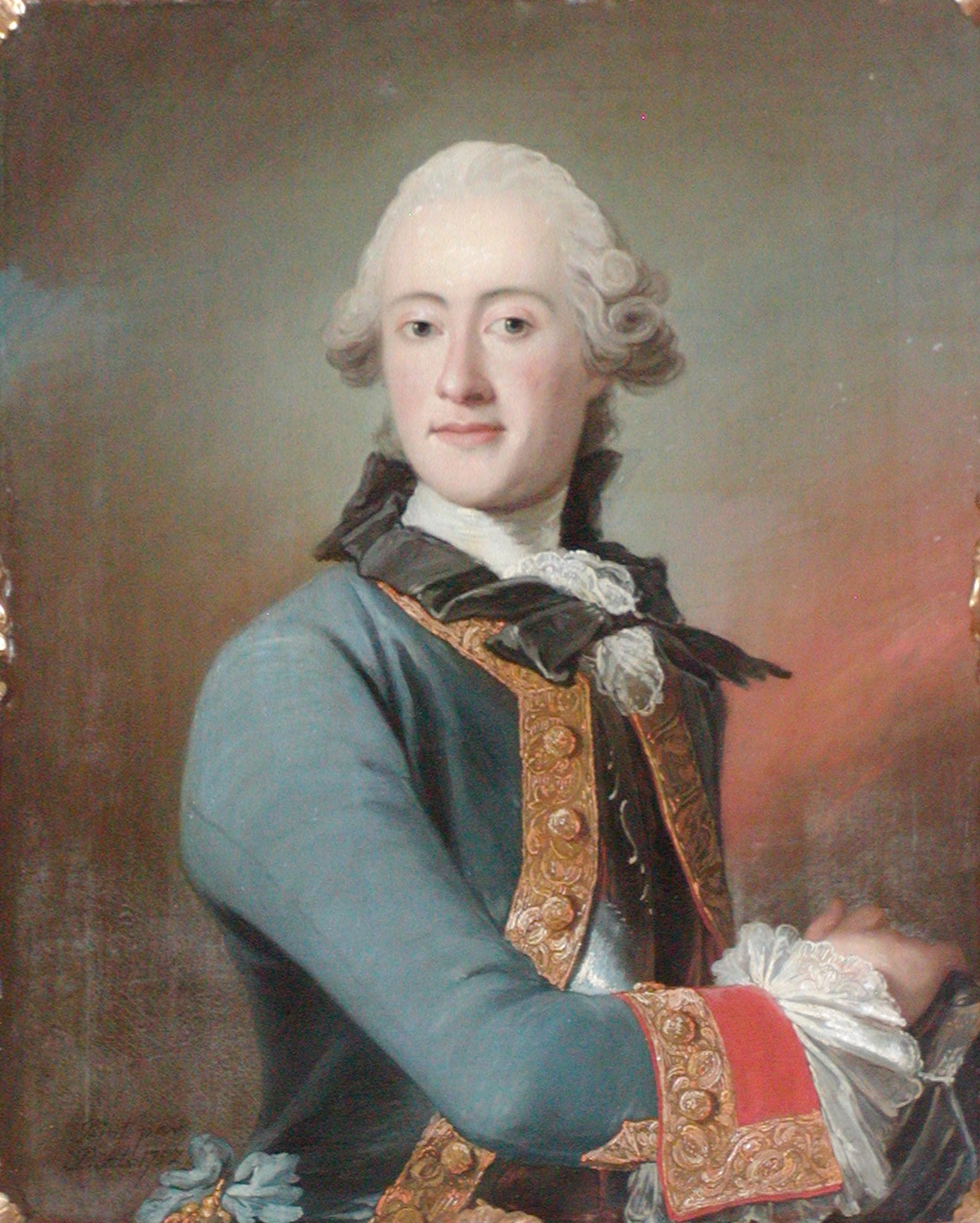
- Frederik Christian portrait attributed to Peder Als
- Born: 1 December 1727; Copenhagen, Denmark
- Died: 28 March 1804 (aged 76); Copenhagen, Denmark
- Burial place: Braaby Church
- Spouses: Sophie Elisabeth Charisius; Edele Sophie Kaas
- Military career
- Allegiance: Denmark
- Branch: Royal Dano-Norwegian Navy
- Service years: 1741–1804
- Rank: Admiral

Frederik Christian Kaas (1 December 1727 – 28 March 1804) was a Danish naval officer and landowner. He served as the governor of the Royal Danish Naval Academy from 1770 to 1781.

== Personal life ==
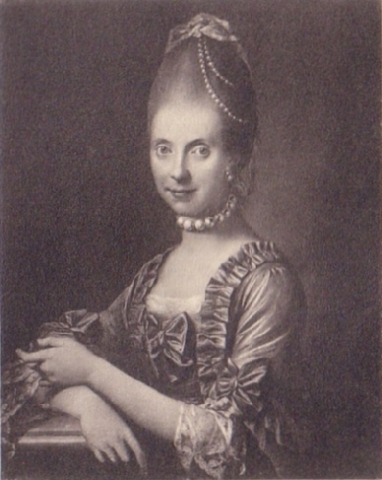
Edel Sophie Sparre-Kaas.

Frederik Christian Kaas was the brother of Ulrik Christian Kaas. Their father was Admiral Ulrich Kaas.

In 1750 he was appointed as a gentleman at the Royal court.

On 7 January 1765, he was married at Constantinsborg to Sophie Elisabeth Charisius who died only four years later. He later married again on 11 September 1771 in Bøstrup Church to Edele Sophie Kaas.

In 1772, with an inheritance from his father-in-law (Otto Ditlev Kaas), he bought an estate on Langeland.

== Service career and promotions ==
From 1739 as a volunteer cadet, Kaas was officially accepted as a cadet in 1741 and sailed on the ship-of-the-line Oldenborg with the squadron to Algiers in 1747.

In October 1747 he was commissioned as a junior lieutenant. Aspiring to become a master shipbuilder he joined the Construction Committee early in 1748, and from 1752 spent over four years along with lieutenant F M Krabbe studying methods of design and construction in England, France, Italy and Holland. Together, on their return to Denmark, the two young officers designed a Xebec and were to have started on a frigate but Kaas, having already had his first command in 1756 as captain of the frigate Hvide Ørn, was posted to the ship-of-the-line Neptunus and never continued his shipbuilding career.

During this time Kaas was promoted twice (to senior lieutenant in October 1753 and to captain-lieutenant in 1755). While Neptunus was in the Mediterranean both captain and second-in-command of the accompanying ship-of-the-line Island fell ill and died, so Kaas was appointed captain of Island and brought her back to Denmark in 1758.

Confirmed in the rank of captain in December 1758, Kaas had command of various frigates (including Christiansborg, Falster and Søridderen) over the next eight years, seeing service in the Baltic and Mediterranean and undertaking a diplomatic mission to Morocco in 1763 with the frigate Havfruen. A quarantine period for the ship returning from Salee, Morocco was applied when Havfruen stopped at Lisbon.

In 1765 he led another mission to Morocco using an armed merchant ship specifically flying the danish royal standard. On return, in the spring of 1766, he was granted three month's special leave to order his personal affairs.

1767 Commander and in 1769 he became captain of the ship-of-the-line Mars. In this ship he carried the British Duchess of Gloucester from Copenhagen, where she had been visiting her sister, Queen Caroline Mathilde, to Mecklenburg in Pommerania. From 1770 to 1781 he was head of the naval officer training college (søkadetkompagniet), and after achieving flag rank in 1780 head of the naval base at Holmen from 1781 to 1792.

- 1775 Commander
- 1780 Rear Admiral
- 1792 Vice Admiral. As a deputy in the admiralty from 1792, Kaas became first deputy (equivalent to Minister for the Navy) in 1796. With his rank he commanded a Danish squadron in 1795 and 1796 which operated alongside his Swedish counterpart in a neutrality patrol. Command of the joint squadron revolved half-yearly from the Swedish vice admiral to the Danish, and back
- 1800 Admiral

== Honours ==
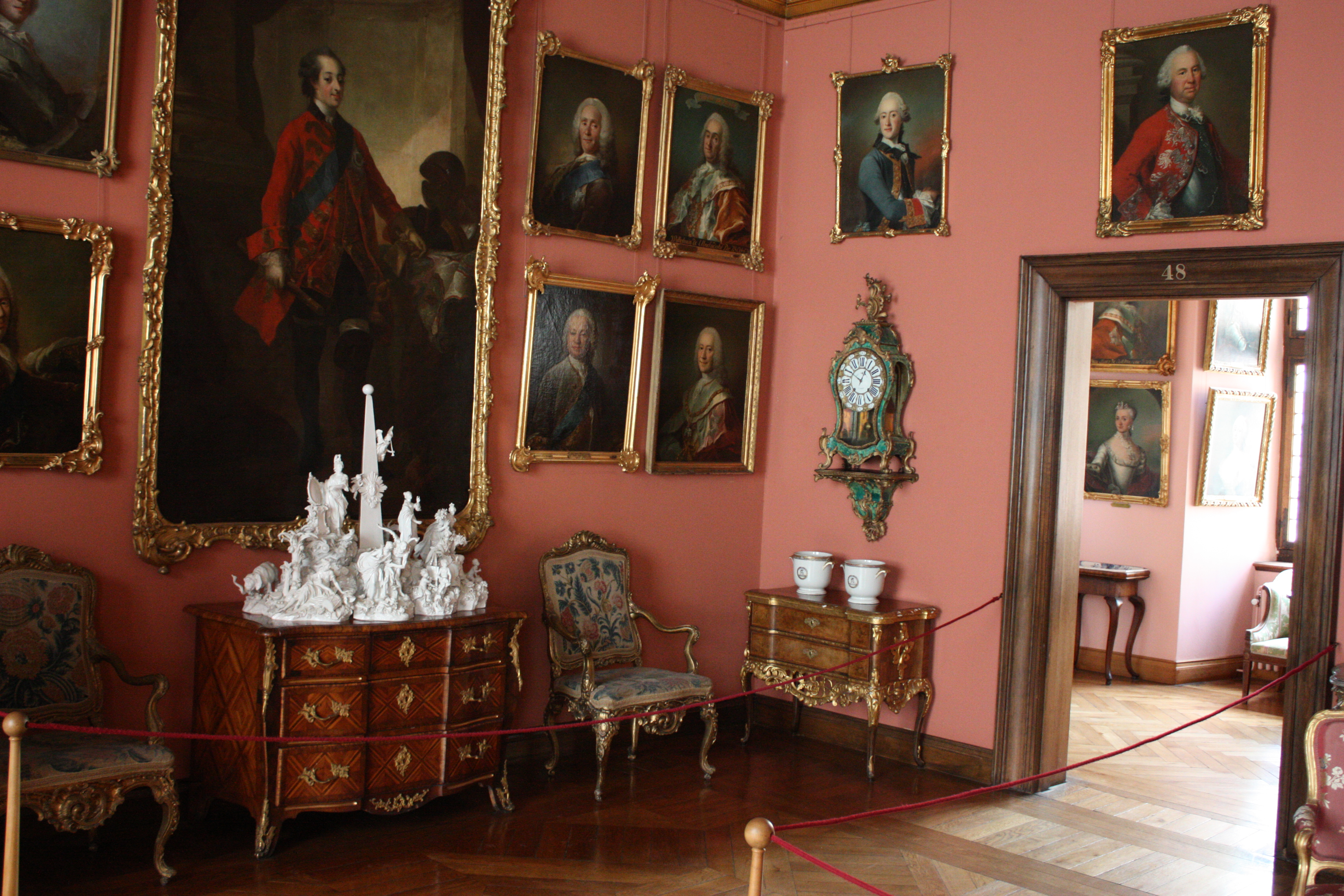
The portrait of Kaas on display in the Museum of National History.

Kaas was appointed White Knight of the Order of the Dannebrog in 1780. A portrait of him is on display in the Museum of National History at Frederiksborg Castle in Hillerød.

== Retirement and death ==
He died 18 March 1804 in Copenhagen whilst still employed at the admiralty, with the funeral service in the chapel of Holmen's Church on 4 April. His body was transferred from there on 4 June 1804 for reburial at Braaby Church, near Roskilde.

== Citations ==
- (in Danish) Project Runeberg: C With on Frederik Christian Kaas (1727–1804) in Danish Biographical Lexikon, vol. 9, pages 56–57
- (in Danish) T. A. Topsøe-Jensen og Emil Marquard (1935) "Officerer i den dansk-norske Søetat 1660–1814 og den danske Søetat 1814–1932" (Danish Naval Officers). Volume 1 and Volume 2.
