= Diderich de Thurah =

Danish autobiographer

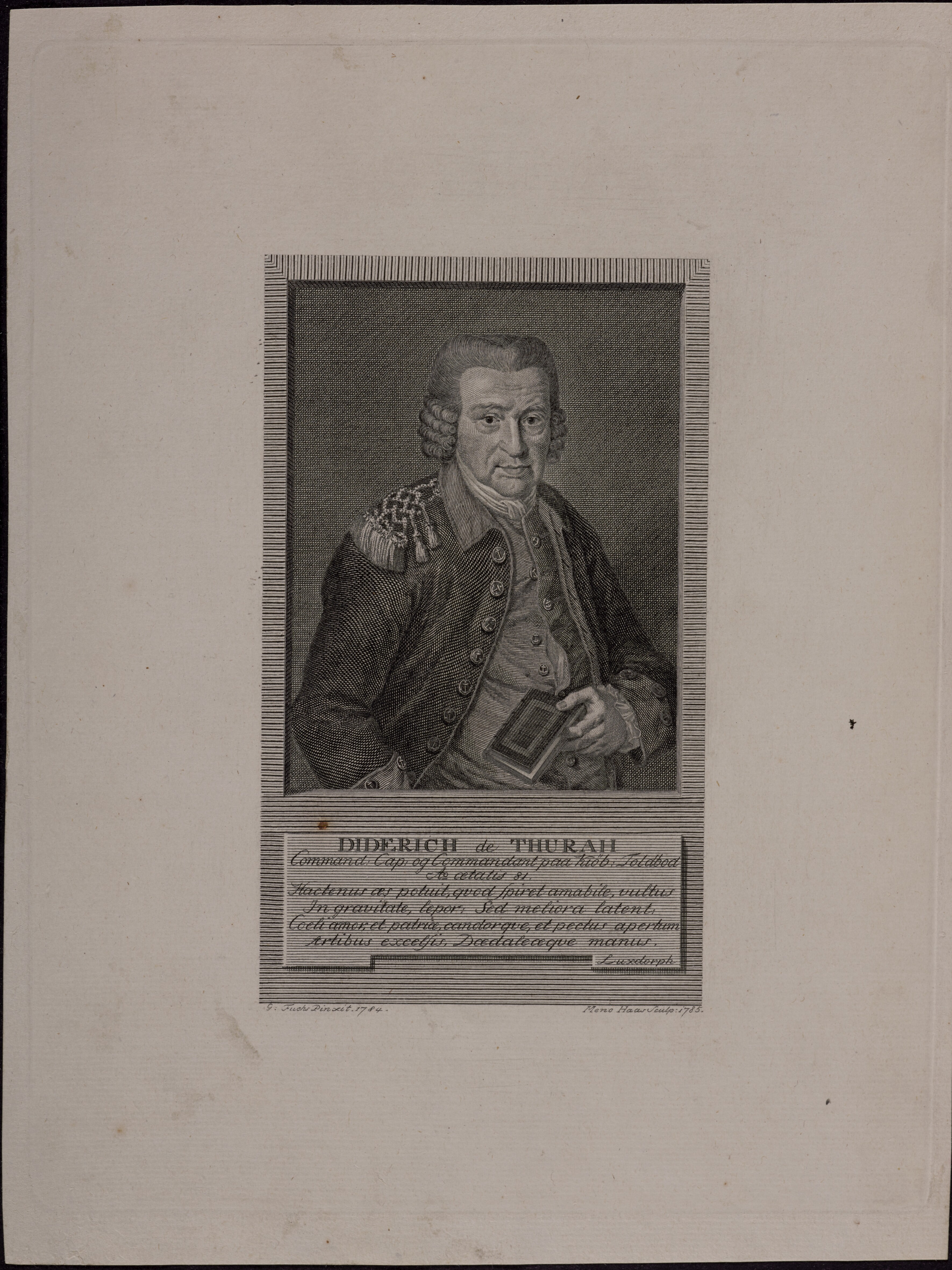
- Diderich de Thurah in his office on Nyholm
- Born: 1 May 1704; Aarhus Denmark
- Died: 1 March 1788 (aged 83); Copenhagen, Denmark
- Burial place: St Peter's Church, Copenhagen
- Military career
- Allegiance: Denmark
- Branch: Royal Dano-Norwegian Navy
- Service years: 1723–1758
- Rank: Commander
- Other work: Artist and Translator

Diderich de Thurah (1 May 1704 – 1 March 1788) was a military cadet, a naval officer in the Royal Danish-Norwegian navy, shipbuilder and fabrikmester, artist and publisher.

He studied with, and worked under, Knud Benstrup. He conspired against Benstrup, but proved an unworthy successor as Fabrikmester. In later life he achieved notability in translating Lutheran texts from English and German, into Danish.

== Personal ==
Born in Aarhus on 1 May 1704, Diderich de Thurah moved to Ribe when his father, Laurids Thura, became bishop of Ribe in 1713. He and his younger brother, Lauritz de Thurah, met King Frederik IV when the monarch was visiting Ribe and chose the two boys for military service. In 1719, he went to Copenhagen as a military cadet, a landkadet in Danish, to receive an education at the Military Cadet Academy (Landkadetakademiet). His older brother, Albert, became a priest and poet.
The painting of "Diderich de Thurah in his office on Nyholm" is attributed to O.H. de Lode.

== Naval career ==
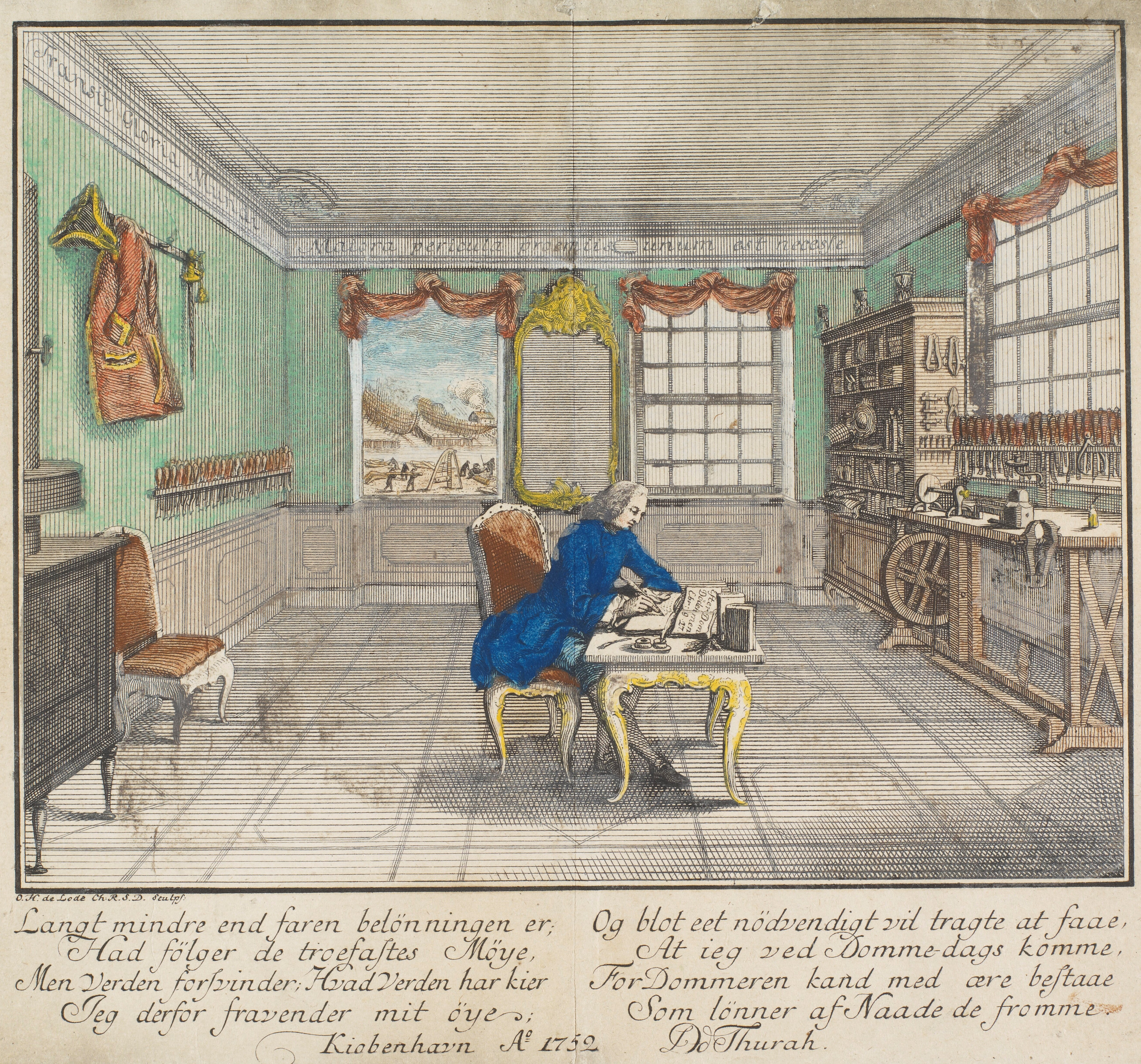
Diderich de Thurah (1752)

In 1723, Diderich de Thurah received an immediate commission into the Royal Danish navy after presenting a fine carved model in amber of the ship-of-the-line Anne Sophie to the king. He chose to specialise in ship construction, and in April 1724, he was sent on an extended study tour to England together with another Danish officer, Lieutenant Bragenæs. (Note: Lieutenant Lauritz Bragenæs died in 1729, less than two years after the study tour was completed.) There was some discussion over his salary which was still that of a cadet, and he could not make his travel expenses stretch. He received his lieutenant's salary from 1 January 1725, but continued to plead that lack of funds led to him missing out on several learning opportunities. By 1726, the Danish admiralty was complaining about the lack of written reports with which it could gauge the two lieutenants' industry and the scientific advances he had been sent to learn. They were ordered to justify themselves.

In late 1726, a book of plans for a 72-gun ship-of-the-line was produced, and the two lieutenants sought a further year to profit from their studies. In November 1727, they were recalled to Copenhagen.

In 1728, Bragenæs and Thurah worked up designs for a 56-gun ship based on English principles – such a ship had to have good sailing qualities and sufficient storage for provisions for longer voyages. In October 1729, together with the experienced shipbuilders Benstrup and Judichær, they critically examined a ship designed by senior lieutenant Krag while that ship was still on the stocks. Benstrup was not happy with Thurah's professional abilities, and relationships soured. Thurah was responsible in 1731 for the purchase of timber for shipbuilding, which necessitated a visit to Holland. Promoted in 1732 and 1734 to the rank of senior lieutenant, (Note: Kaptajnløjtnant - see Ranks and insignia of NATO navies' officers) he became head of naval shipbuilding, fabrikmester in 1734.

Further promoted to captain and then commander (in 1738), Thurah continued to have problems with his finances, requiring a gift from royal funds to settle with his creditors. He was reprimanded for exceeding his authority in the shipyard by removing Turesen from the supervision of the building of the ships Jylland and Dannebrog, and ordered to curb his animosity and attend more professionally to his duties. Although he retained the title of fabrikmester until 1758, his designs were not acceptable for ships of the fleet, and the Frenchman Laurent Barbé was appointed as chief ship designer. From 1758, he was replaced as fabrikmester and given the post of head of customs. A charge of abuse of authority was laid against Thurah in 1764 by a ship owner in Aalborg, when the latter's ship De To Sønner was arrested, a charge vigorously contested by Thurah.

=== Thurah's ships ===
Very few ships are credited to Deiderich de Thurah by the Royal Danish Naval Museum:

- Dannebroge (1739) ship-of-the-line
- Fyen (1736) ship-of-the-line (Because of poor sailing qualities, this ship was decommissioned and sold to the Danish Asiatic Company in 1745.)
- Langeland (1736) brig
- Møen (1736) brig
- Windhunden (1754) yacht or kongebaad (Note: Launch date was either 1754 (Skibregister) or 1753 (Royal Danish Naval Museum records). As a "kongebaad" she may have been employed carrying the royal mail)
- Unnamed (1736) boat

== Other interests ==
He was an artist, known for carving amber and ivory.

A carving in amber of the Judichaer designed ship-of-the-line Dronning Anne Sophie was presented to the monarch in 1723 and was on display in the king's art collection.

In 1729 and 1730, additional to his shipyard duties, he was art tutor to the 7-year-old crown prince (the future Frederick V of Denmark). (Note: Caveat: The source Bjerg in Gyldendal names the crown prince as the future Christian VI, but the dates are wrong. Frederik IV died in 1730 and the young crown prince was his grandson - see List of Danish monarchs)

On leaving the navy, until his death in 1788, Thurah was busy for many years with literary work and translations, particularly in relation to religious art and tracts. Amongst the pieces he translated from English were works by James Blair, Thomas Newton, William Sherlock and Lady Pakington. In this later career, he proved more successful than in his earlier life as a naval officer.

== Burial ==
Thurah died in Copenhagen on 1 March 1788 and was buried in St. Peter's Church, the German-speaking Lutheran church.

== Citations ==
Some input from Danish Wikipedia articles da:Diderich de Thurah and da:Fabrikmester and da:Knud Nielsen Benstrup

- Bjerg H C: Diderich de Thurah in Dansk Biografisk Leksikon, 3 edition., Gyldendal 1979–84. accessed 8 September 2019
- Kornerup B: Albert Thura in Dansk Biografisk Leksikon, 3 ed., Gyldendal 1979–84. Accessed 18 September 2019
- T. A. Topsøe-Jensen og Emil Marquard (1935) “Officerer i den dansk-norske Søetat 1660-1814 og den danske Søetat 1814-1932“ (Danish Naval Officers)
- Project Runeberg - Samlinger til en beskrivende Catalog over Portraiter af Danske, Norske og Holstenere / (Written descriptions of portraits by Danish, Norwegian and Holstein artists).
- Royal Danish Naval Museum website for Database > Avancerede > Set Konstructør to "Thurah" > Søg (This works only if the language is set to Danish)
- Royal Danish Naval Museum - List of Danish Warships
- Royal Danish Naval Museum - Skibregister for individual ships record cards where they exist.
