= Christen Thomesen Sehested =

Danish admiral

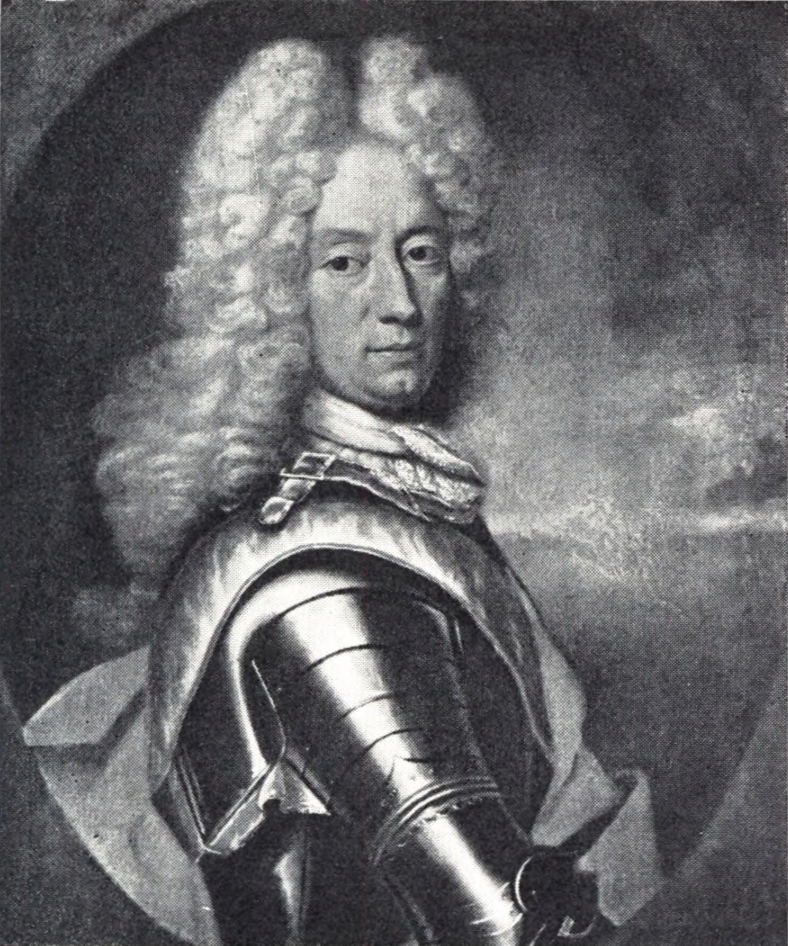
Christen Thomsen Sehested.

Christen Thomesen Sehested (24 August 1664 – 13 September 1736) was a Danish Admiral. He headed the Royal Danish Naval Academy from 1701 to 1715.

== Biography ==
Sehested was born in Copenhagen, Denmark-Norway. He was the son of lieutenant-colonel Axel Sehested (1627-1676) and grandson of nobleman Christen Thomesen Sehested (1590-1657) who served as the King's chancellor. In 1680, Sehested apprenticed in the Danish Royal Navy. He became the naval officer in 1687 and in 1691 had his first command on board the frigate "Svenske Falk" on a convoy to France. In 1700, he had command of the naval vessel "Prins Carl".

During the Great Northern War, he served as an admiral under the command of Lord High Admiral Ulrik Christian Gyldenløve, Count of Samsø (1678–1719). In 1709 he served as Gyldenløve's flag captain during the troop transfer to Scania and participated in 1710 during the battle between the Dano-Norwegian and Swedish fleets at Køge Bugt. He headed the Royal Danish Naval Academy from 1701 to 1715. He left the naval service in 1716.

Sehested Fjord in SE Greenland was named after him.
