= Ole Judichær =

Danish shipbuilder and admiral (1661–1729)

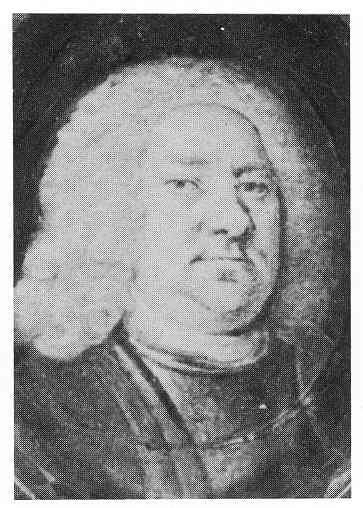
- Born: 20 March 1661; Gottland, Sweden
- Died: 29 September 1729 (aged 68); Næstved, Denmark
- Burial place: Church of Holmen, Copenhagen
- Military career
- Allegiance: Denmark
- Branch: Royal Danish Navy
- Service years: 1690–1725
- Rank: Admiral
- Conflicts: Great Northern War

Ole (Olaus) Judichær (20 March 1661 – 29 September 1729) was a Danish shipbuilder and admiral in the Royal Danish Navy.

== Early life ==
Ole (or Olaus) Judichær was born on 20 March 1661 in Gotland, although this date may have been 20 February 1661 where his father was the parish priest in the very south of the island. At the age of seventeen he departed for Copenhagen where, in 1683 and 1684, he studied theology. Later he studied mathematics under the scientist Ole Rømer, who recommended Judichær to Niels Juel and to Admiral Henrik Span. He became tutor to the household of the latter, during which time he occasionally preached in the naval Church of Holmen.

== Naval career ==
In 1690 he was appointed deputy dockmaster at Bremerholm (better known as Gammelholm in today’s Copenhagen) and a short time thereafter as leader in the shipbuilding department. With the launch of the ship-of-the-line Dannebroge in 1692 – the first ship to be built at Nyholm – he was officially named as dockmaster and fabrikmester, positions he retained until 1725.
From being a civilian employed as shipbuilder at the Royal Naval dockyards, he was commission in 1698 direct to the rank of commander (kommandørkaptajn) despite not having followed the normal officer training pathway. In 1706 or 1708, in response to complaints that his ship designs were influenced by too much theory, he embarked on a study tour to Holland and England. Whilst in Britain he accompanied Admiral George Byng on a voyage to Lisbon. The return of hostilities in the Baltic caused his England tour to be curtailed, and shortly thereafter he was in Lithuania purchasing timber for shipbuilding, followed by Christiansø where he was to renovate the defence works of that Baltic island.

In 1710, at the Battle of Køge Bay, Judichær commanded a squadron in the fleet led by Gyldenløve. As chief of coastal defence from 1711 he was responsible for the scuttling of decommissioned warships to form the foundation of the sea fort Trekroner on the approaches to Copenhagen harbour.

He is credited with 23 ships-of-the-line and nine frigates

=== Ships-of-the-line attributed to Judichær ===
- Beskiermeren (1708)
- Delmenhorst (1707)
- Dronning Anna Sophia (1722)
- Ebenetzer (1709)
- Elephanten (1703)
- Christianus Quintus (1699)
- Fridericus Quartus (1699), a gigantic ship with 110 guns. It proved that the lower gundeck was unusable when at sea in windy conditions.
- Fyen (1705)
- Haffruen (1701) (or Havfruen) (Note: In the Royal Danish Naval museum database the ship's name is spelt Haffruen- the probable correct name is Havfruen which translates as "The Mermaid")
- Island (1706) (Note: possibly not a Judichær ship - built in Glückstadt)
- Justitia (1707)
- Jylland (1704)
- Laaland (1711)
- Printz Christian (1697)
- Prinz Carl (1696)
- Prinz Wilhelm (1696)
- Slesvig (1725)
- Sophia Hedevig (1697)
- Sophia Magdalena (1727)
- Wenden (1706)
- plus two more unnamed ships-of-the-line

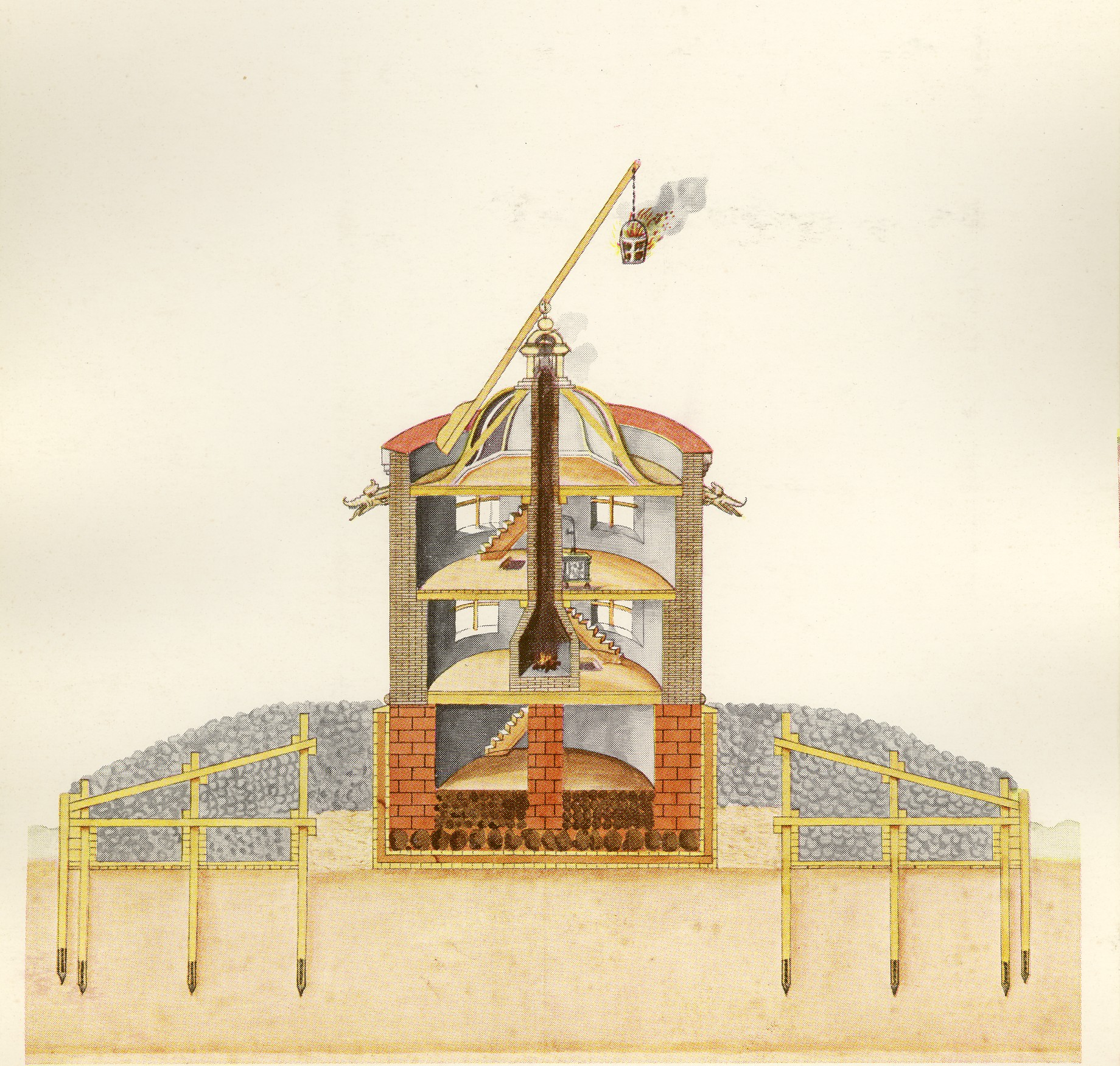
Judicher's 1701 proposal for a tower topped by a vippefyr (tipping light).

Judichær introduced scientific method into the building of ships in Denmark, and was promoted over the period he was in post to eventually become Holmen’s Admiral in 1714. During the Great Northern War he was loaded with many responsibilities in addition to shipbuilding, including officer commanding Zealand’s coastal defences – despite his lack of traditional training as a naval officer or in naval warfare. His distinguished performance in many of these duties saw him grow in confidence and also in stubbornness. In 1700 he refused to take defensive measures to block Flinterenden (Note: Flinterenden is the strategic 15 Km passage at the southern end of Øresund, between Saltholm and Skåne, before the Baltic Sea. It is called that because the bottom is composed of flint and chalk. Depth of some seven meters.) which the Swedish fleet nevertheless had problems navigating to join their British and Dutch allies in the bombardment of Copenhagen and troop landings at Humlebæk in August of that year.
In 1718 Judichær designed and built shallow draft floating mortar platforms for use in the rocky coastal waters of Sweden

In 1719 he used a diving bell designed and built by himself for investigation and raising of ships that had been sunk at Marstrand

== Dismissal, retirement and death ==
With the end of the Great Northern War his detractors within the Danish Admiralty grew, led by the admirals Råben and Frants Trojel who complained about him to the king, Frederik IV, and accused him of bringing his office into disrepute. Judichær, by his whimsical response to these charges, did not gain any friends and was made a scapegoat for all that was wrong at the shipyards, being dismissed in 1725 – a decision formally approved in 1727. The story that he had to leave Holmen in disgrace through the Slaves Gate is provably untrue.

He retired to Næstved where he died on 29 September 1729. His coffin was placed in the chapel of the naval church at Holmen in 1730.

== Citations ==
This article is translated from the Danish Wikipedia article da:Ole Judichær, checked and augmented against the in-line references cited.

- Bjerg H C: Ole Judichær in Dansk Biografisk Leksikon, 3 ed., Gyldendal 1979-84. Accessed 8. October 2019
- Pilotage in the Malmø area (Swedish Pilot)
- Project Runeberg:Ole Judichær in Dansk Biografisk Leksikon
- Royal Danish Naval Museum website for all warships attributed to a named shipbuilder. From the website follow Database > Avancerede > Set Konstructør to Judichær > Søg (This works only if the language is set to Danish). For particular types of ships, follow the same path, but set the filters accordingly.
- Royal Danish Naval Museum - List of Danish Warships
- Royal Danish Naval Museum - Skibregister for individual ship's record cards where they exist.
