= Battle of Rügen (1715) =

Naval Battle of the Great Northern War

- Part of the Great Northern War
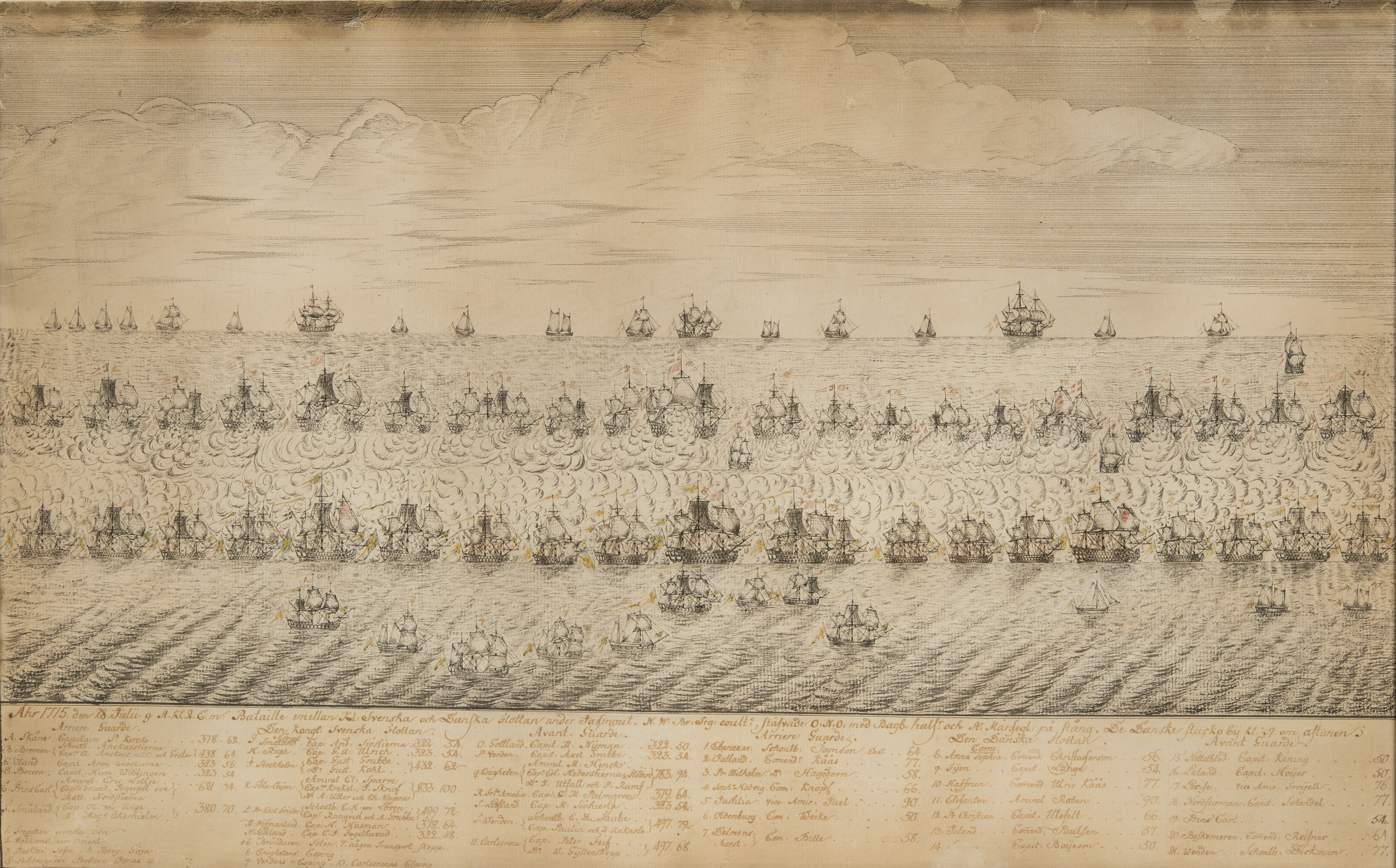
Date	28 July 1715 (O.S.); 8 August 1715 (N.S.)
Location	Rügen
Result	See Aftermath

Belligerents
(yes) Swedish Empire	Denmark-Norway

Commanders and leaders
(Swedish Empire) Claes Sparre	(Denmark–Norway) Peter Raben

Strength
20 ships of the line 2 frigates	21 ships of the line 4 frigates

Casualties and losses
145 dead 333 wounded	127 dead 485 wounded

Battle of Rügen was a major naval battle fought on 8 August 1715 (N.S.) off Jasmund on the Swedish island of Rügen (present-day Germany) during the Great Northern War.

In the Swedish navy 20 ships of the line and two frigates participated, in the Danish 21 ships of the line and four frigates. The battle ended with a Danish strategic victory but was tactically inconclusive. No ships were lost on either side but many soldiers were either dead or wounded – Sweden: 478, Denmark: 612.

== Action ==
Vice admiral Christen Thomesen Sehested flew his flag from HDMS Justitia as commander of the vanguard of Raben's fleet which was sent on 9 July 1715 to Pomerania to ensure passage of troop transports of 6000 men to the land forces on Rügen besieging Stralsund. (Admiral Knud Reedtz had been assembling these troop transports in Grønsund between the Danish islands of Falster and Møn from midsummer 1714.)

On 20 July Admiral Raben, in command of the main Danish fleet, retreated to Øresund (off Copenhagen) when faced with an overwhelming Swedish force until he could be reinforced - leaving Sehested's squadron to occupy the Swedish fleet without engaging them.

Before the battle, Sehested had been replaced by vice admiral Just Juel and his flagship, Justitia, was now commanding the rear guard of the Danish fleet. In the battle of 8 August vice admiral Juel was killed.

== Aftermath ==
The battle, although inconclusive in naval terms, forced the Swedish fleet to withdraw and allowed the troop transports to proceed. Nydyb (Note: Nydyb appears to be the large bay south of Rügen, recorded as Nie Diep on a map dating from the period) was taken on 25–26 September, the island of Rügen 54°20′N 13°29′E surrendered after the Battle of Stresow on 15 November and Stralsund itself 54°18′33″N 13°04′55″E two days before Christmas 1715.

== Bibliography ==
- Topsøe-Jensen, T. A.; Marquard, Emil (1935). Officerer i den dansk-norske Søetat 1660-1814 og den danske Søetat 1814-1932 (in Danish). Two volumes: Volume 1 and Volume 2.
