= Nyholm =

Nyholm is a surname. Notable people with the surname include:

- Arvid Nyholm (1866–1927), Swedish-American artist
- Bengt Nyholm (1930–2015), Swedish football goalkeeper
- Elsa Nyholm (1911–2002), Swedish botanist
- Gustaf Nyholm (1880–1957), Swedish chess master
- Helinä Häkkänen-Nyholm (born 1971), Finnish psychologist
- Jesper Nyholm (born 1993), Swedish footballer
- Nikolaj Nyholm (born 1975), Danish businessman
- Robert Nyholm (born 1988), Finnish ice hockey player
- Ronald Sydney Nyholm (1917–1971), Australian chemist

== See also ==
- Nyholm Naval Base, a former naval base in Copenhagen, Denmark
- Nyholm Central Guardhouse, is a historic building at Holmen in Copenhagen, Denmark
- Nyholm Prize for Education, Royal Society of Chemistry award
