= Gunboat Sheds, Copenhagen =

Buildings in Copenhagen, Denmark

The Gunboat Sheds
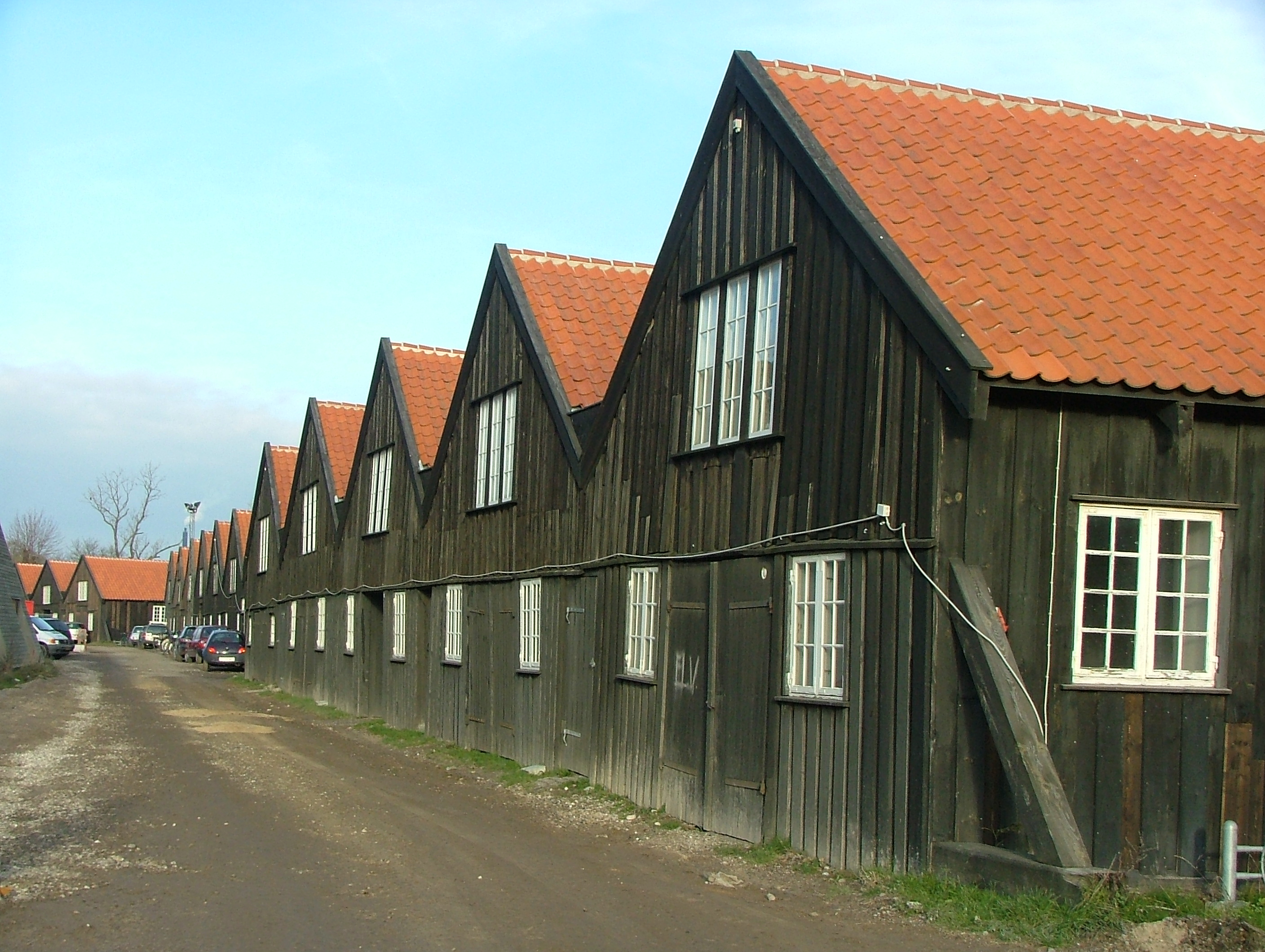
- The Gunboat Sheds
- Interactive map of the The Gunboat Sheds area

General information
- Location: Copenhagen, Denmark
- Coordinates: 55.6807°N 12.6071°E
- Construction started: 1813
- Completed: 1850
- Client: Royal Danish Navy

The Gunboat Sheds (Kanonbådsskurene) is a row of 32 black-painted wooden sheds located on the east coast of Frederiksholm, part of Holmen, in Copenhagen, Denmark. Built in the first half of the 19th century for the naval base which used to occupy the grounds, they have now been adapted for other use. They were listed in 1964.

== History ==
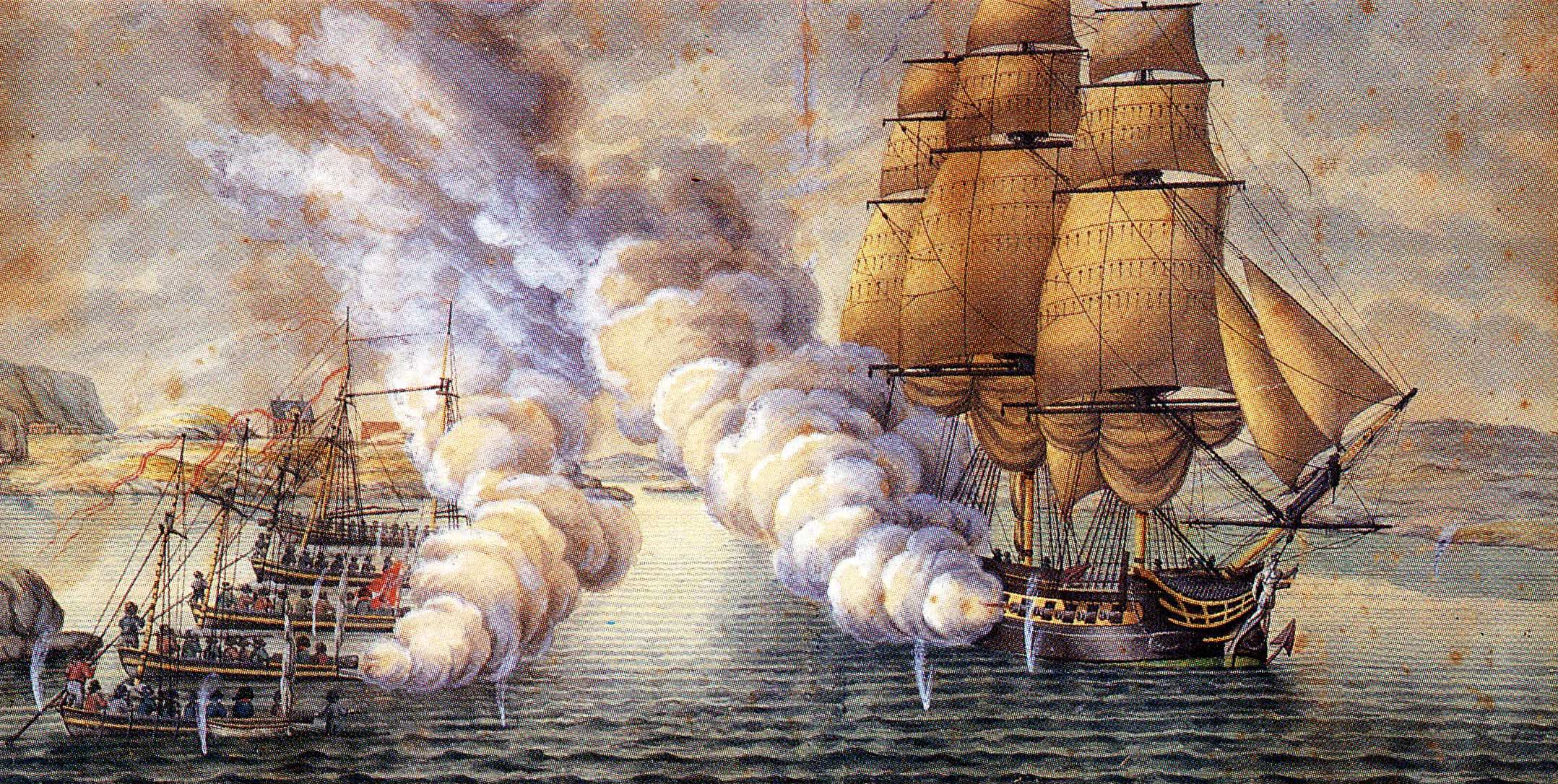
Battle between the frigate HMS Tartar and Danish gunboats

The Gunboat Sheds owe their existence and name to the so-called gunboats which were built after the Danish naval fleet had been captured at the Holmen Naval Base by the Royal British Navy on 21 October 1807. The gunboats were used in the last stage of the English Wars, now known as the Gunboat War. The small gunboats were employed against the conventional Royal British Navy. Built to provide on-land protection for the gunboats when they were not in use, the sheds were mainly built in around 1830. Each shed could accommodate two gunboats.

When the gunboats were replaced by more modern vessels, the sheds remained in use for storing motor boats and other smaller vessels. They were listed in 1964 but had fallen into a state of neglect by the time the Navy left Holmen in 1996. They were sold in 1998 and in 1999 to Søtoftegård A/S and Keops A/S. The new owners undertook a thorough restoration and adapted the buildings for use as office space with the assistance of PLH Architects. On 18 August 2006 a fire destroyed five sheds in the middle of the row but they were subsequently rebuilt.

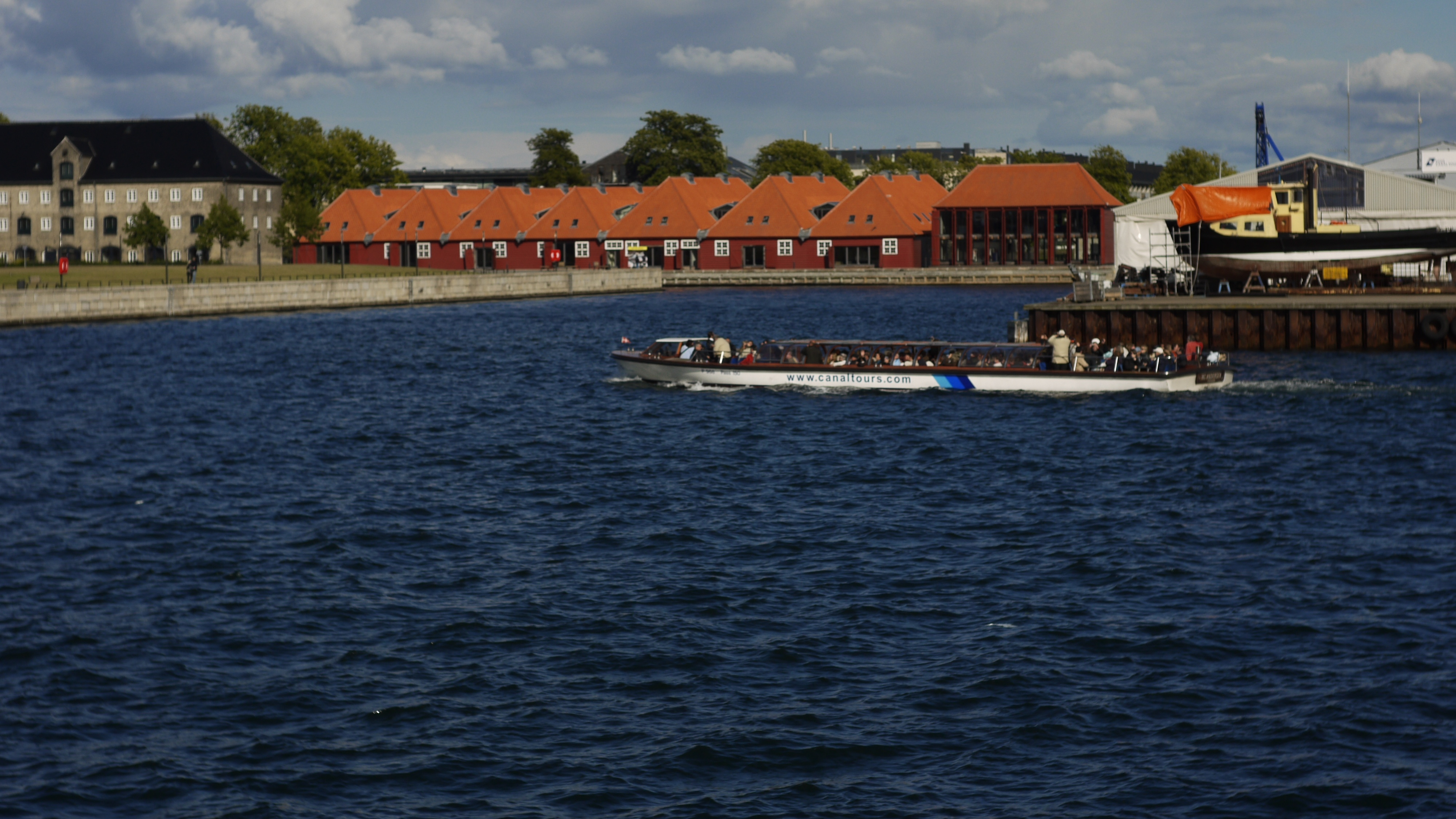
The Gunboat Sheds seen from the water

== The Gunboat Sheds today ==
Since the renovation, the sheds have housed small businesses mainly in the creative sector, such as advertising agencies, media houses and architectural practises. The tenants include KHR Arkitekter and the short-lived newspaper Dagen was also based there. The street Kanonbådsvej is named after the sheds.

== See also ==
- Nyholm Central Guardhouse
