= Royal Danish Naval Museum =

Naval museum in Søkvæsthuset, Denmark

- Orlogsmuseet
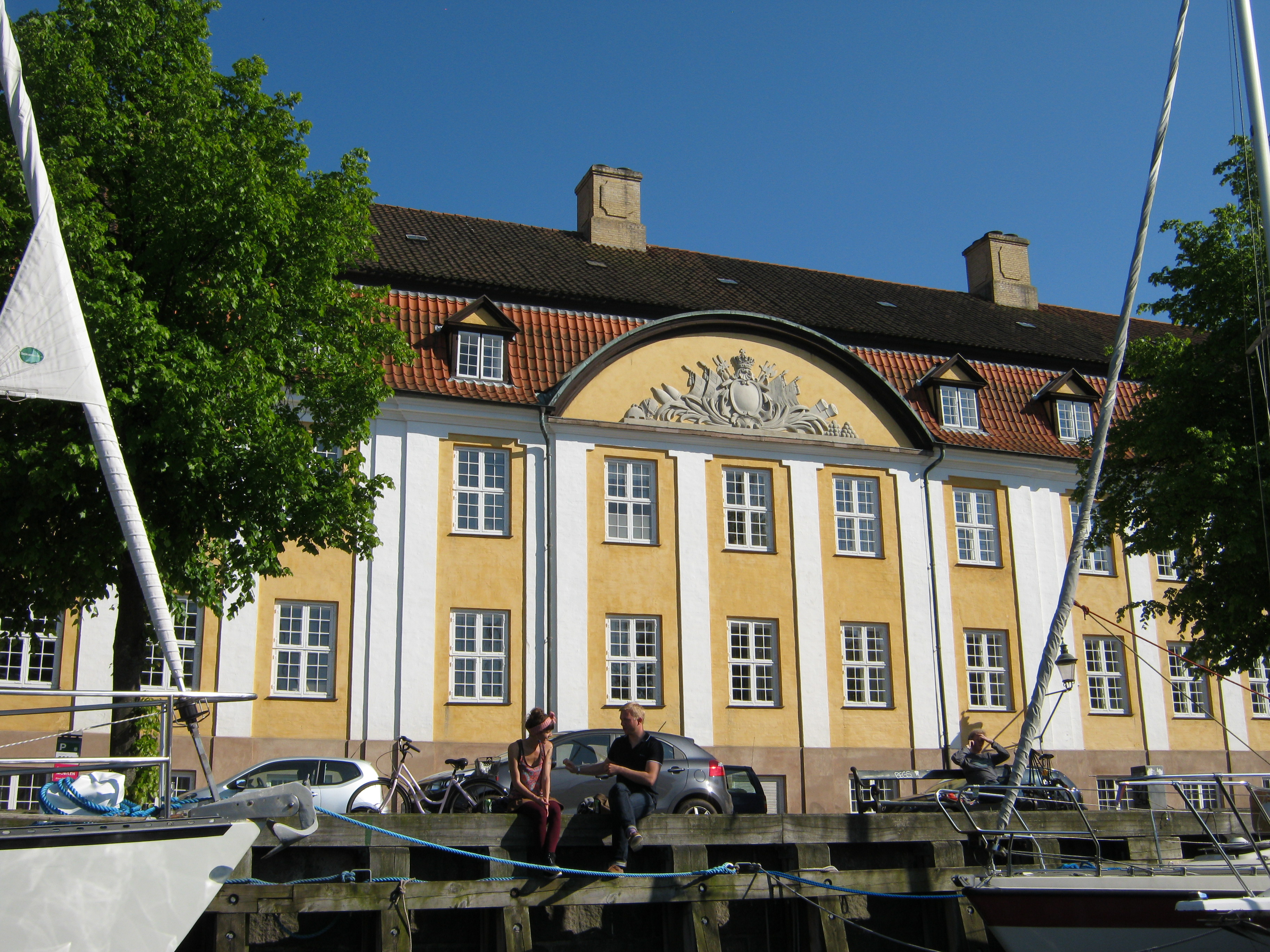
- The museum viewed from Wilder's Canal
- Established: 1976
- Location: 58 Ovengade Oven Vandet; Copenhagen, Denmark
- Coordinates: 55.6742°N 12.5945°E
- Director: Ole Louis Frantzen
- Website: Official website

The Royal Danish Naval Museum (Danish: Orlogsmuseet) is a museum dedicated to the history of the Royal Danish Navy. The displays include a collection of naval models which dates back to late 17th century. The museum is based in Søkvæsthuset, a former naval hospice which overlooks Christianshavn Canal.

The museum is a branch of the Museum of Military History which also includes the Tøjhus Museum at Slotsholmen and three museum ships, the frigate HDMS Peder Skram, the fast attack craft HDMS Sehested, and the submarine HDMS Sælen, all located at Holmen.

== History ==
The museum traces its history back to the foundation of the Royal Model Collection which dates back to the 17th century when it became common practice to build accurate models of ships, or detail models of components of them or their fittings, as part of the ship building process. In 1773 the collection was installed at Gammelholm but later passed into oblivion. The 1830s saw a renewed interest in ship models, both the historic ones and of new ships, and the collection was finally installed once again in 1862. In 1894, a new building for the Royal Model Collection was constructed at Holmen.

In 1940, the collection was evacuated and put in storage out of fear that it would be destroyed in the event of a German attack on the Danish Navy. After the Liberation in 1945, its building had been taken into use for other purposes. The museum was founded 1957 at the initiative of Vice Admiral A.H. Vedel and found a temporary home in St. Nicolas Church. In 1974 a branch of the museum opened at Valdemars Castle on the island of Tåsinge which mainly focussed on the naval hero Niels Juel who had owned the estate in the middle of the 17th century. In 1984 the temporary premises at St. Nicolas' closed and the exhibition moved to a building at Christianshavn Rampart at Christianshavn. In 1884 the south wing of Søkvæsthuset was put at the disposal of the museum which reopened at its new premises on 4 October 1989.

In 2015, the museum permanently closed.

== Building ==
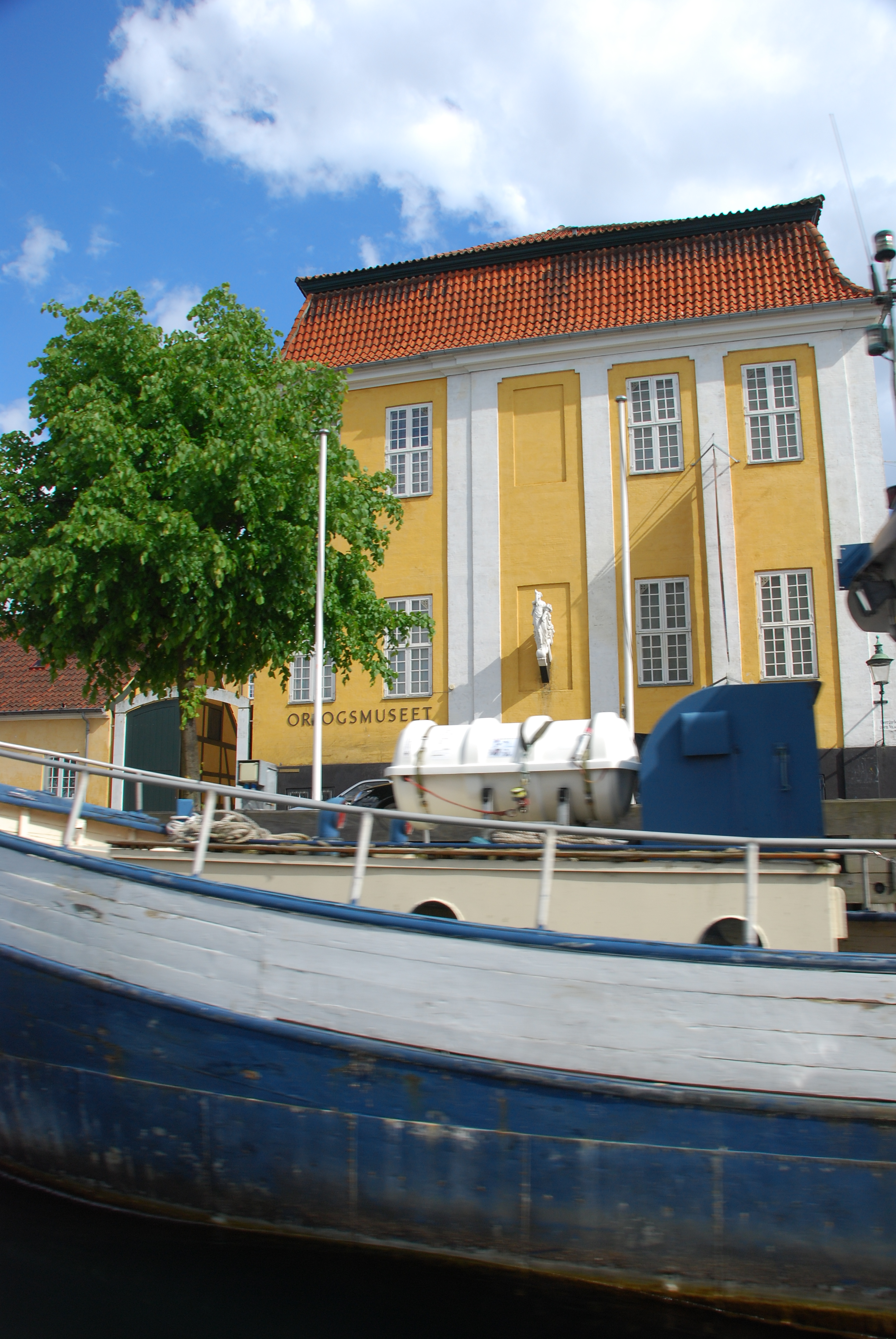
The wing with the Naval Museum

The building was designed by J. C. Conradi and completed in 1755 as the home of the Royal Orphanage (da. Det Kongelige Opfostringshus) which had been founded a few years earlier and took care of the upbringing of sons of single parents from poor backgrounds. In 1775 the institution moved to new premises in Store Kongensgade and the building was instead converted into a new home for the Royal Naval Hospice which had until then been located at Sankt Annæ Plads. The wing toward Bådsmandsstræde, which now houses the Naval Museum, was built in 1781 by the mason J. B. Schottmann (1734–1786).

The long building stands in yellow-dressed masonry with light grey pilasters. The rounded pediment is decorated with war trophies.

== Exhibition ==
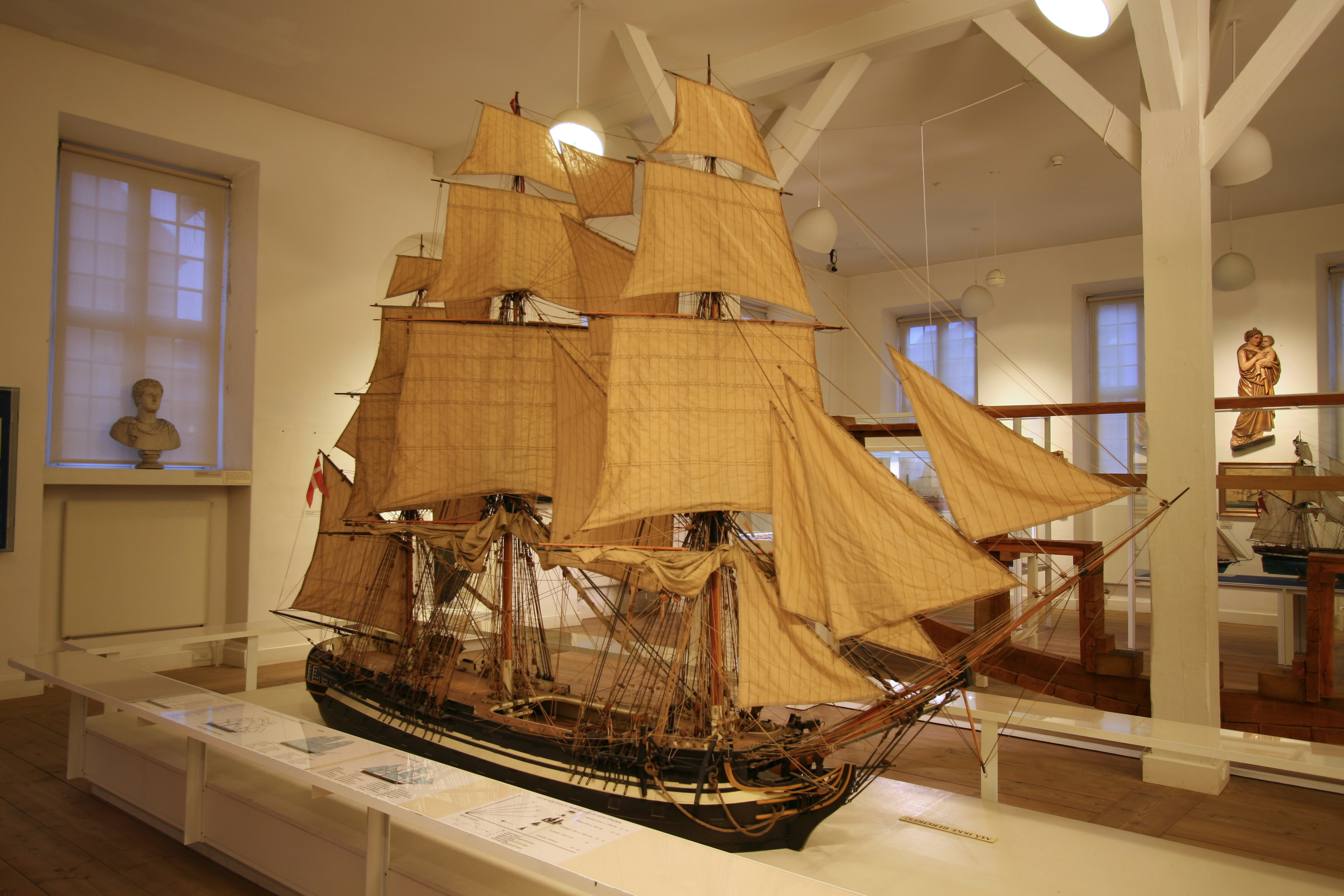
A model of Phoenix

=== Model Collections ===
The oldest ship in the Model Collection is an unnamed vessel from the 1660s with a bust resembling Niels Juel decorating its Transom. The collection consists of several hundred large and small models, ranging from fully rigged ships of the line to over model docks to various detail models. A common trait of the models is that they display fine craftsmanship and an immense richness of detail. The models served as a sort of "blue prints" and are therefore crafted in accurate scale.

The museum has also acquired several modern models of contemporary naval vessels, including a model of a flexible support ship of the Absalon class.

=== Artifacts, marine painting and maps ===
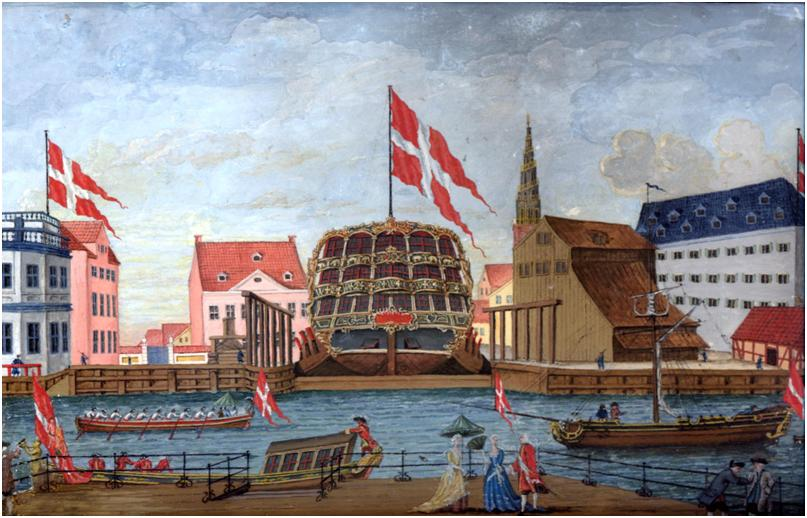
A painting in the museum showing ship at Old Dock, not far from the current museum building (c. 1750)

The exhibitions also comprise a vast number of weapons, uniforms and artifacts such as navigational equipment and tools.

The museum also holds a large number of artworks which depict naval history. Represented artists include Christian Mølsted, Anthon Melbye and Christoffer Wilhelm Eckersberg.

=== Dioramas ===
Apart from the collections, the museum also use diorama of important naval battles and mock-ups to present the history of the Danish Navy.

== Historic ships at Holmen ==
The museum also takes in three decommissioned naval ships of the Cold War era which are docked at Nyholm. They can only be visited during the summer months (June–August) and on limited opening hours.

During opening hours visitors are free to walk around the largest of the ships, FDMS Peder Skram, a Peder Skram class frigate, while the two others, HDMS Sælen, a submarine, and HDMS Sehested, a Willemose-class missile boat, can only be visited on tours. They start every 30 minutes during opening hours and are available in English. The opening hours for the ships are:

June: Sælen and Sehested: Weekends from 11.00 am - 5 pm. Peder Skram: All days from 11.00 am - 5 pm.

July: All ships from 11.00 am - 5 pm.

August: Until 15 August: All ships from 11.00 am - 5 pm. From 15 August: Only Peder Skram, open 11.00 am - 5 pm.

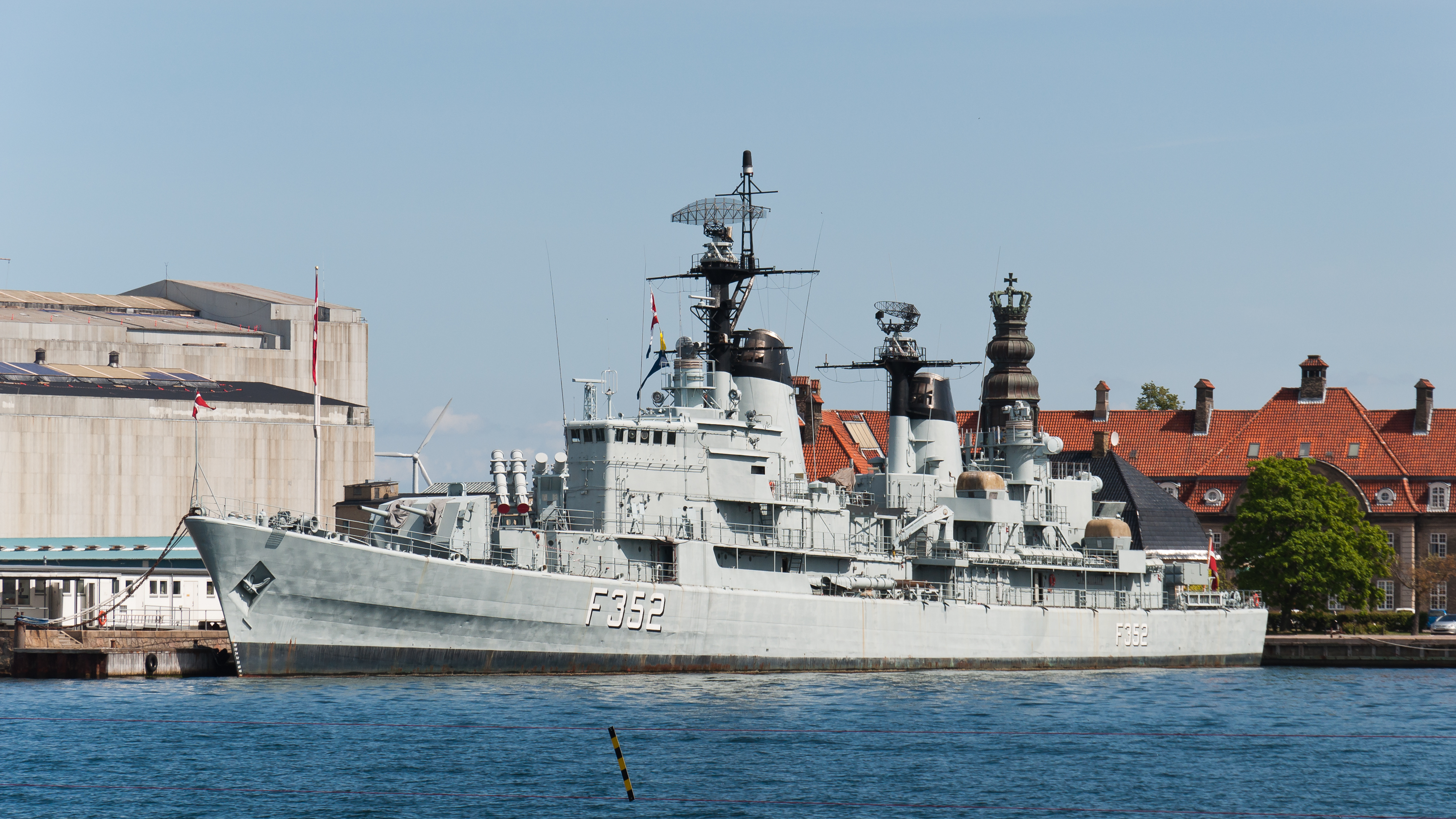
HDMS Peder Skram

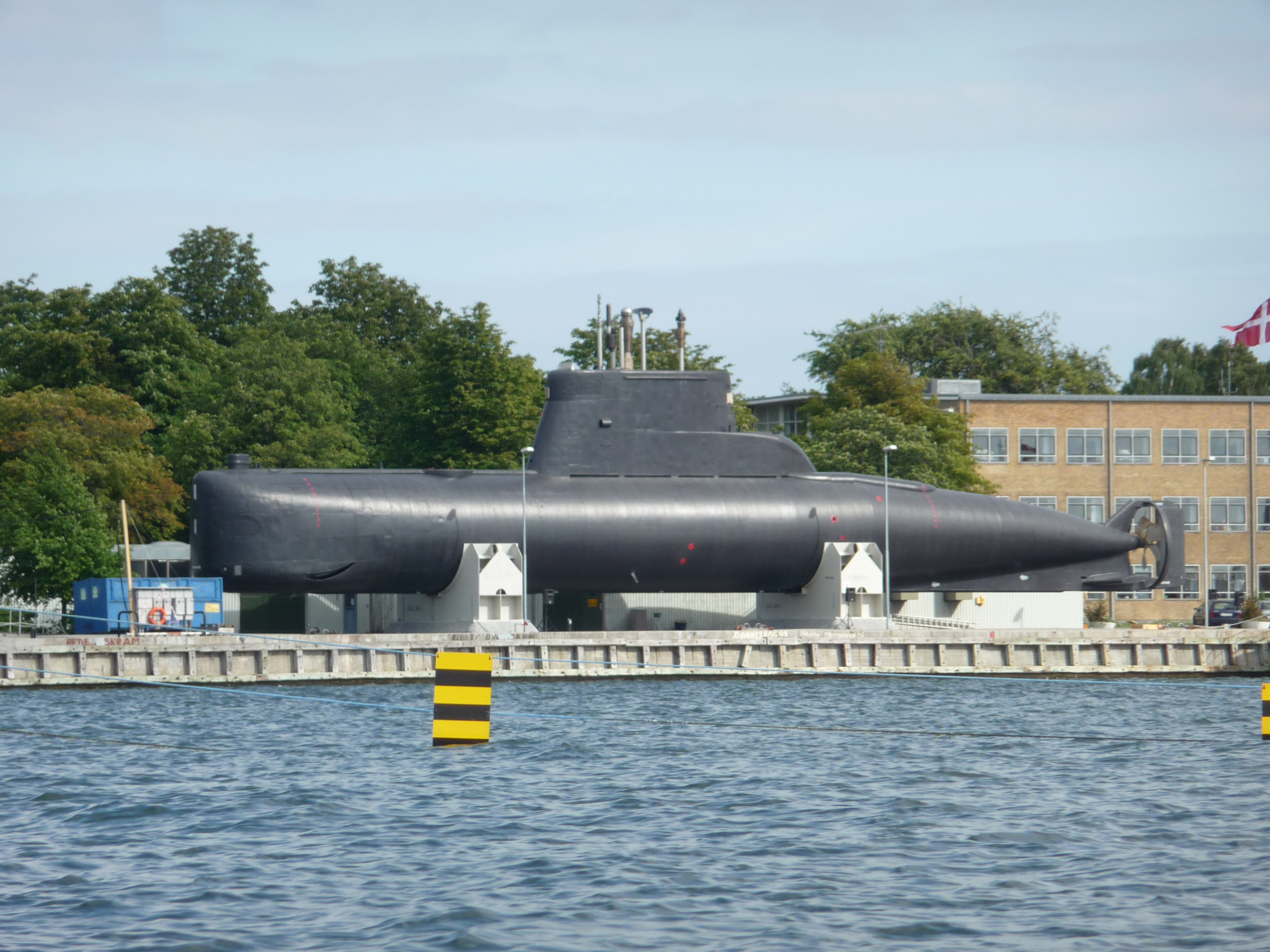
HDMS Sælen

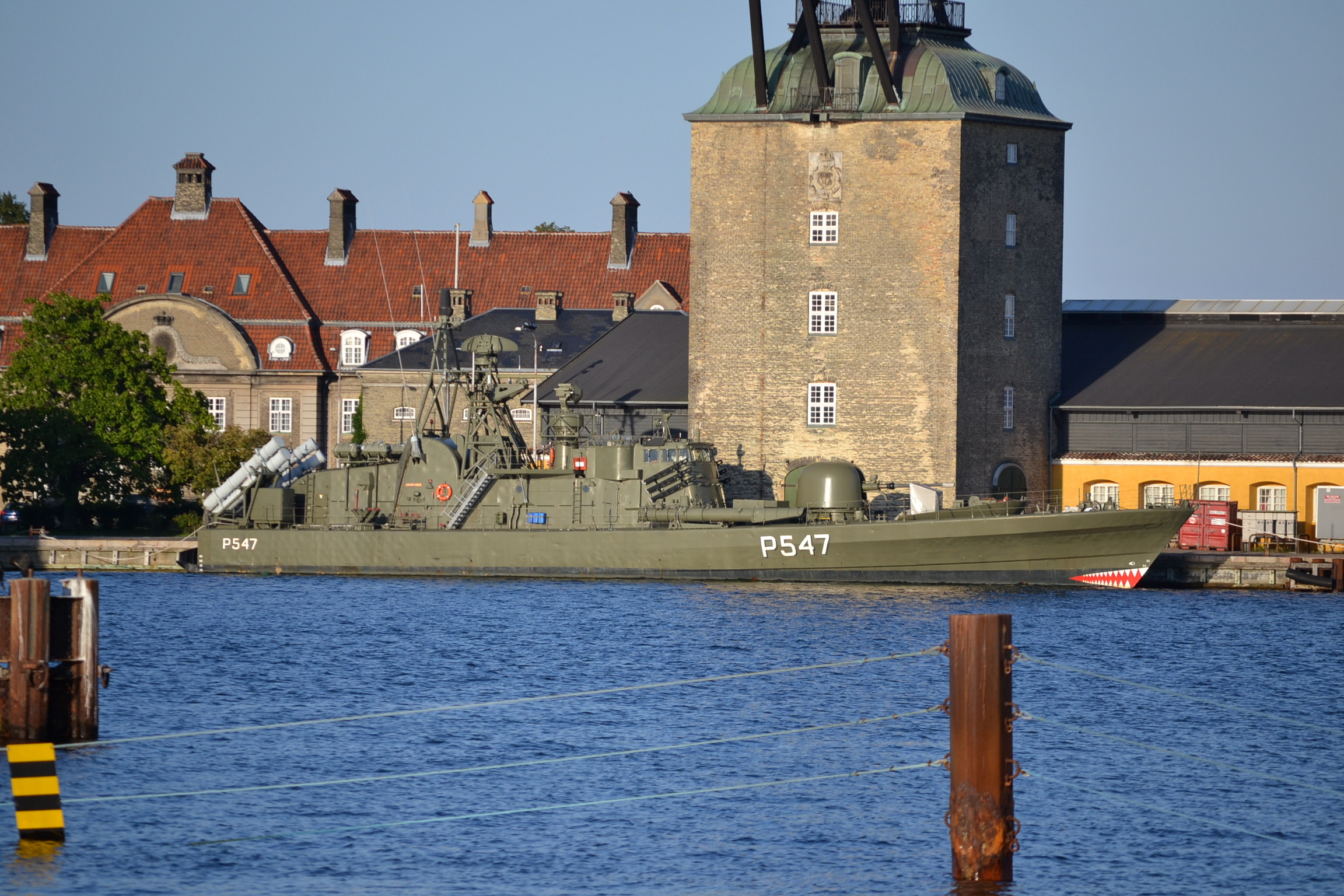
HDMS Sehested

== See also ==
- List of museums in and around Copenhagen
