= Willemoes-class missile boat =

Danish naval ship class (1977–2000)

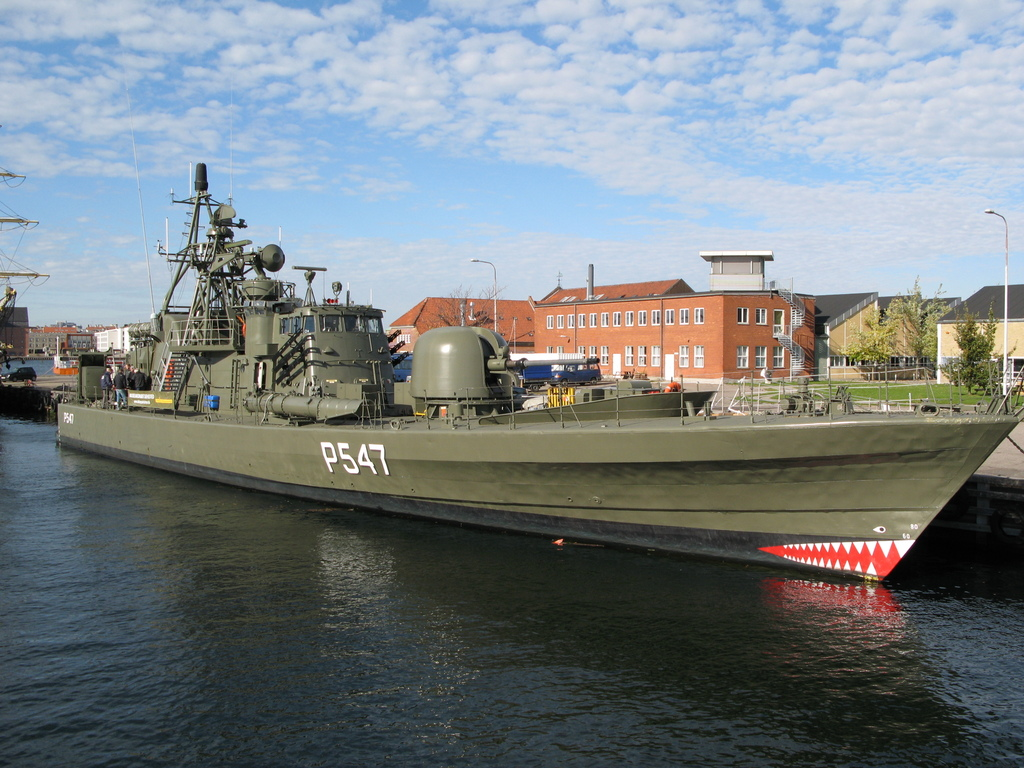
- HDMS Sehested (P547)

Class overview
- Builders: Frederikshavn Værft, Frederikshavn
- Operators: Royal Danish Navy
- Built: 1974–1978
- In commission: 1977–2000
- Completed: 10
- Retired: 10
- Preserved: 1

General characteristics
- Type: Missile boat
- Displacement: 260 tons, standard
- Length: 46 m (150 ft 11 in)
- Beam: 7.4 m (24 ft 3 in)
- Draft: 2.2 m (7 ft 3 in)
- Propulsion: 3 x Rolls-Royce Proteus gas turbines (12,750 hp) and 2× General Motors 12V-71 diesel engines(730 hp)
- Speed: 40 kn (74 km/h) on gas turbines; 12 kn (22 km/h) on diesels
- Range: 400 nmi (740 km) at 36 kn (67 km/h)
- Complement: 24
- Sensors & processing systems: 1× Terma 20T48 navigation radar; 1× Philips Elektronik AB 9GR-208 air/surface radar; 1× Bofors Electronics 9LV Mk 1 (RAKEL 203) fire control radar; 1 × 9LV Naval Combat Management System; Racal Cutlass B-1 ESM
- Armament: 1 × 76-mm OTO Melara Gun; 2× Stinger; 8× RGM-84 Harpoon; 2–4× 553 mm TP 613 torpedoes or 20 naval mines

The Willemoes-class missile boat was a Royal Danish Navy class of fast missile boats serving from late 1970s until 2000. Designed by Orlogsværftet, in conjunction with the German yard Lürssen, the Willemoes class could achieve a maximum speed in excess of 40 knots (74 km/h; 46 mph). Their weapons consisted of one 76 mm (3 in) OTO Melara gun and combination of RGM-84 Harpoon missiles and torpedo tubes. When the full assortment of eight Harpoons was carried, two 533 mm (21 in) torpedo tubes were carried as well. With Harpoons removed, up to four torpedo tubes could be mounted. Alternatively, it could carry a payload of naval mines.

The guided missile boat HDMS Sehested is now a museum ship at Holmen.

== List of ships ==
Pnt.	Name	Keel laid	Launched	Commissioned	Named by	Decommissioned	Callsign
P540	Bille	18 October 1974	23 December 1974	14 June 1977	Captain S. E. Thiede	15 March 2000	OVFV
P541	Bredal	11 February 1975	18 April 1975	14 June 1977	Rear Admiral H. M. Petersen	15 March 2000	OVFW
P542	Hammer	6 June 1975	3 October 1975	1 February 1978	Captain F. A. H. Kjølsen	15 March 2000	OVFX
P543	Huitfeldt	8 October 1975	16 January 1976	1 February 1978	Vice Admiral S. E. Pontoppidan	1 April 2000	OVFY
P544	Krieger	6 February 1976	19 May 1976	1 February 1978	Vice Admiral A. Helms	1 April 2000	OVFZ
P545	Norby	3 June 1976	24 September 1976	15 February 1978	Rear Admiral O. Brinck-Lund	1 April 2000	OVEA
P546	Rodsteen	17 September 1976	9 December 1976	15 February 1978	Mayor of Frederikshavn Villy Christensen	1 October 2000	OVEB
P547	Sehested	22 December 1976	5 May 1977	19 May 1978	Permanent Secretary P. V. Christiansen	31. December 2000	OVEC
P548	Suenson	27 May 1977	26 August 1977	10 August 1978	Minister of Defence Poul Søgaard	1 April 2000	OVED
P549	Willemoes	26 July 1974	19 October 1974	20 March 1977	Prince Henrik	1 July 2000	OVEE
