= Häkkänen =

Häkkänen is a Finnish surname. Notable people with the surname include:

- Juha Häkkänen (born 1945), Finnish actor
- Helinä Häkkänen-Nyholm (born 1971), Finnish psychologist
- Antti Häkkänen (born 1985), Finnish politician
