= Masting sheer =

Specialised shipyard crane

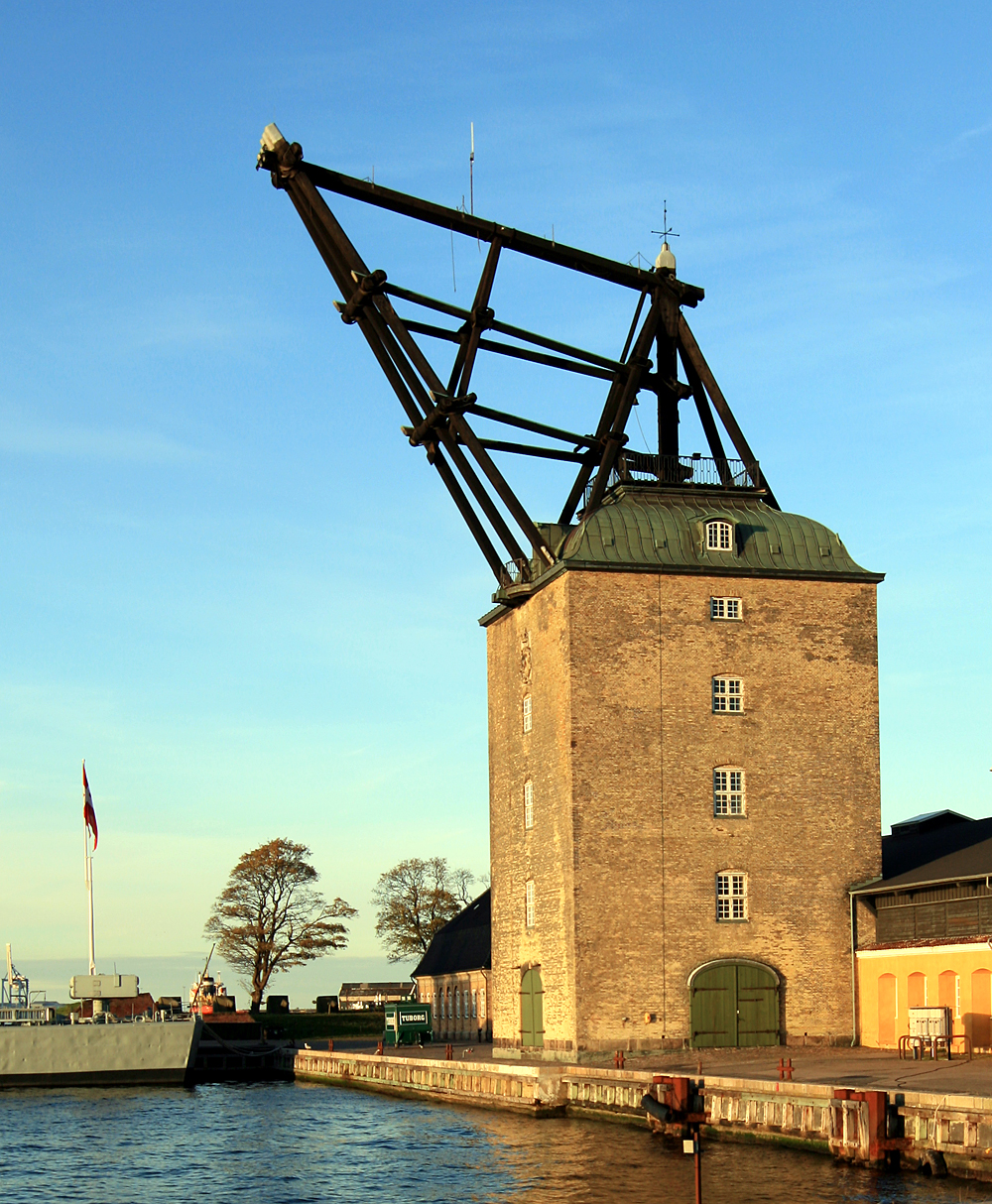
Frederik V's Masting Sheers at Holmen, Copenhagen, Denmark. Built 1746

A masting sheer, sheers, shears or masting crane is a specialised shipyard crane, intended for placing tall masts onto large sailing ships. "Sheers" is an old name for a fixed crane formed by one or two wooden beams, fixed at the base and supported by ropes.

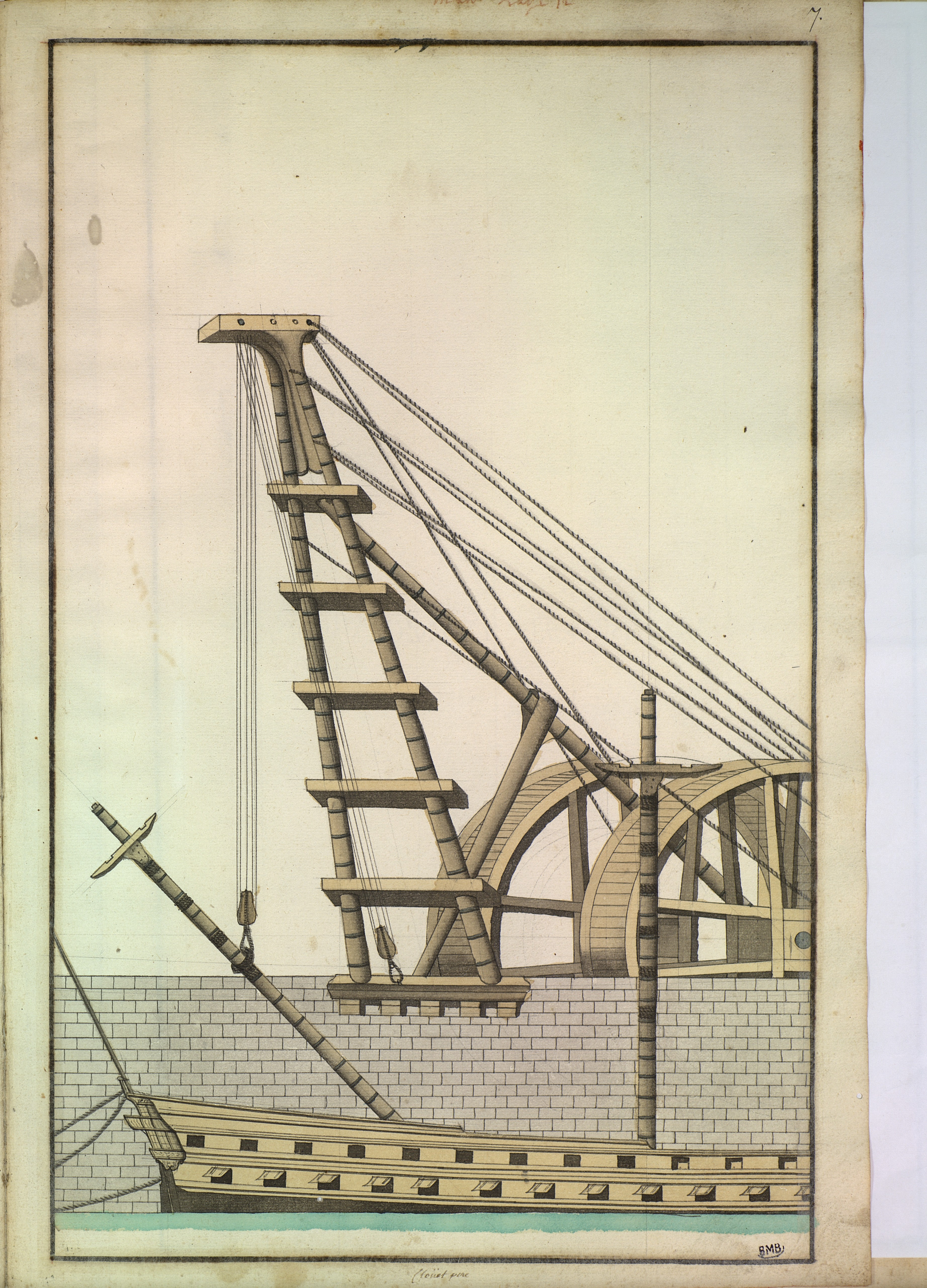
18th century French masting sheer, with treadwheel crane

Ancient sailing ships did not require sheers to erect their masts, as they could be lifted into place by ropes and allowed to pivot around their feet. As ships became larger, their larger and heavier masts were no longer able to be handled in this way. A crane was needed, tall enough to lift the entire mast vertically and then lower it into the ship. By the 18th century, such sheers were a necessity in any large shipyard.

As sheers are not required to move, they were often constructed as masonry towers, with wooden jib structures atop them. Few have survived intact, but some of the towers remain, having now lost their jibs.

In the late 19th century, the increasing size and capacity of general harbour cranes began to overlap with the lofty but lightweight masting sheer and so their specialisation was no longer required.

== See also ==
- Sheer hulk, a floating variant
