= Nyholm Central Guardhouse =

- Nyholms Hovedvagt
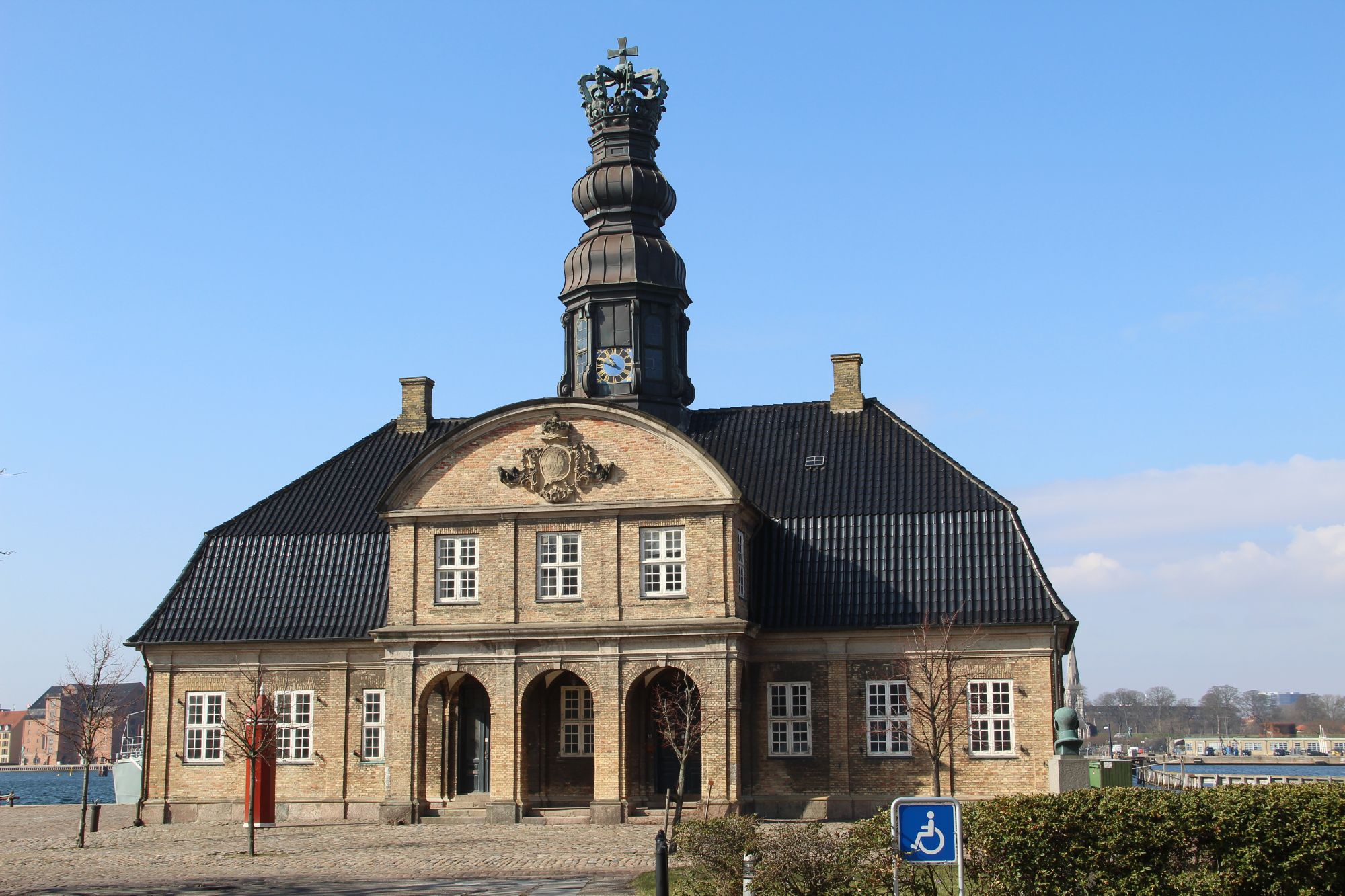
- The building from the water
- Interactive map of the Nyholm Central Guardhouse area

General information
- Architectural style: Baroque
- Location: Copenhagen, Denmark, Denmark
- Coordinates: 55.6887°N 12.6062°E
- Completed: 1745
- Client: Royal Danish Navy.

Design and construction
- Architect: Philip de Lange

Nyholm Central Guardhouse is a historic building at Holmen in Copenhagen, Denmark. It was built in 1745 as part of the Nyholm Naval Base which had been established on reclaimed land at the site in 1690.

== History ==
The first guardhouse at Nyholm was located inside the Neptune Battery (now Sixtus Battery). When the building had become outdated and the grounds were being restructured, Naval Secretary Frederik Danneskiold-Samsøe proposed the construction of a new building to King Christian VI. The plans were approved in February 1744 and the project was assigned to Philip de Lange who served as Naval Master Builder for almost 30 years and also contributed with many other buildings at Nyholm, and the building was completed the following year. It guarded the passage between the Custom House and Nyholm. It was also used for receiving important guests to the naval base.

== Architecture ==
Nyholm Central Guardhouse is built in the Baroque style. A typical 18th-century Corps de garde, it is open on the front side to provide shelter for guards on duty.

The most distinctive feature of the building is its large ridge turret. The design was probably determined by the need to make room for a clock. Old engravings show it used to have a flag pole projecting vertically from the crown at the top. The clock was manufactured by clock-maker Peter in 1753 and was a personal gift from Frederick V.

Due to the large crown topping the turret, the building was for many years colloquially referred to as "Under Kronen" (English: "Beneath the Crown"). The crown was copied by Thorvald Jørgensen in his design of the spire for the present (third) Christiansborg Palace. However, in connection with a renovation in 1934, two more crowns were added to the original spire at Christiansborg, making the resemblance somewhat less obvious.

== Nyholm Central Guardhouse today ==
The director's office is used in connection with official visits to Holmen. It is also used by the head of the Danish Navy Operative Command. The office is partly furnished with furniture from Slesvig, a former royal ship.

== See also ==
- Mastekranen
