= Mastekranen =

Shipyard crane in Copenhagen, Denmark

The Masting Crane
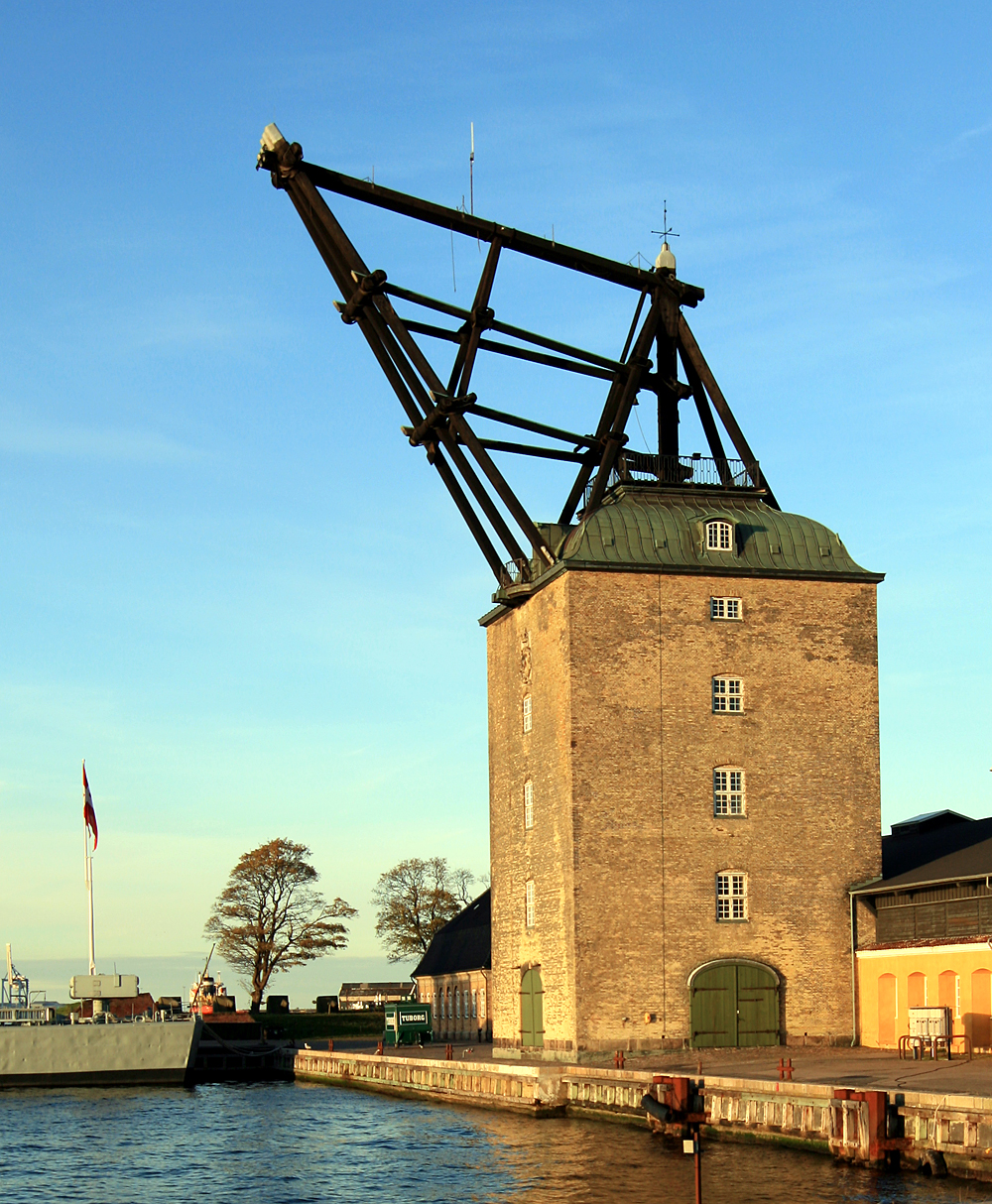
- Interactive map of the The Masting Crane area

General information
- Architectural style: Baroque
- Location: Copenhagen, Denmark
- Coordinates: 55.6881°N 12.6060°E
- Construction started: 1748
- Completed: 1751
- Client: Holmen Naval Base

Technical details
- Structural system: Timbered structure with masonry shield

Design and construction
- Architect: Philip de Lange

Mastekranen (English: The Masting Crane) is an 18th-century masting sheer and present landmark on Holmen in Copenhagen, Denmark. It was designed by architect Philip de Lange and built in 1748–51 as part of the Royal Naval Shipyard at Holmen.

== History ==
Under the reign of Frederick III, Holmen was established through a series of land reclamations to replace the naval base and shipyard at Bremerholm. The first ship to be set to sea from Nyholm was Dannebroge in 1692 and in the following years the construction of all major vessels gradually moved there. The facilities at Holmen were constantly expanded over the next centuries.

Earlier the building of sailing ships had not required sheers to erect their mast, as it could be lifted into place by ropes and allowed to pivot around its foot. As ships became larger, it was no longer possible to mount their masts, taller and heavier, in this fashion. A crane was needed, tall enough to lift the entire mast vertically and then lower it into the ship. It was as a consequence of this development that the Masting Crane on Nyholm was erected in 1748–51. In the late 19th century, the increasing size and capacity of general harbour cranes began to overlap with the lofty but lightweight masting sheers and so their specialisation was no longer required. In 1918 all shipyard activities at Nyholm were discontinued and moved to Frederiksholm.

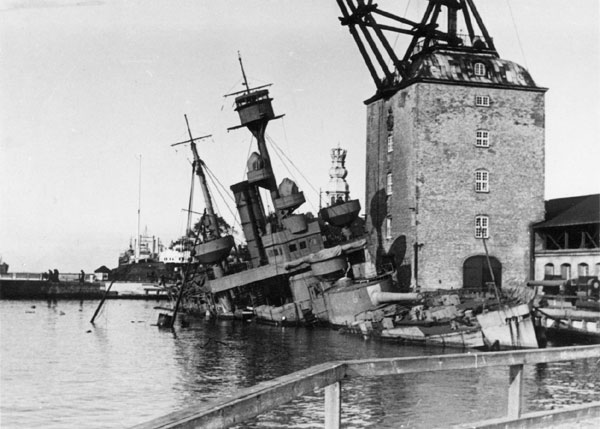
HDMS Peder Skram, scuttled on 29 August 1943

During WWII, the Danish fleet chose to scuttle themselves in response to Operation Safari. The coastal defence ship HDMS Peder Skram was scuttled at the quay alongside the crane.

== Architecture ==
The Masting Crane was designed by Philip de Lange in the baroque style. While it appears to be a masonry tower with a wooden jib atop, the entire crane is in fact a timber structure with the outer wall only serving as a protective shield against sun, rain and wind. The uppermost wooden structure is kept together by tarred rope to make it more flexible and not to weaken the wood.

Even though the Masting Crane is "just" a piece of industrial equipment, it has been designed with gradually lower windows for each floor to create an optical illusion making it appear taller and more imposing.

== The masting sheer in art ==
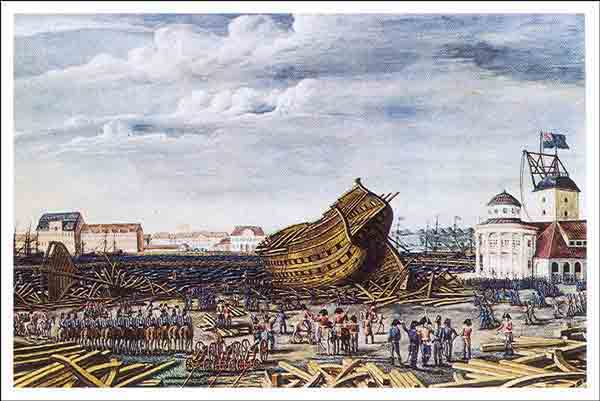
C. W. Eckersberg: British destructions at Holmen (1807)

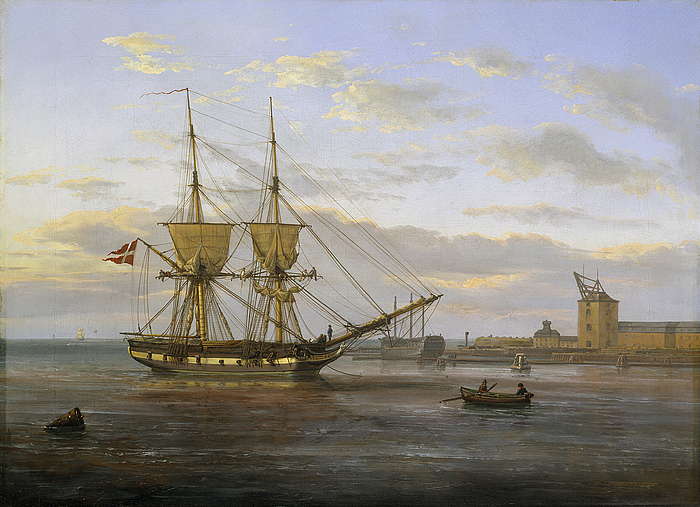
Johan Christian Dahl: Indsejlingen til København (1830)
Thorvaldsen Museum, Copenhagen

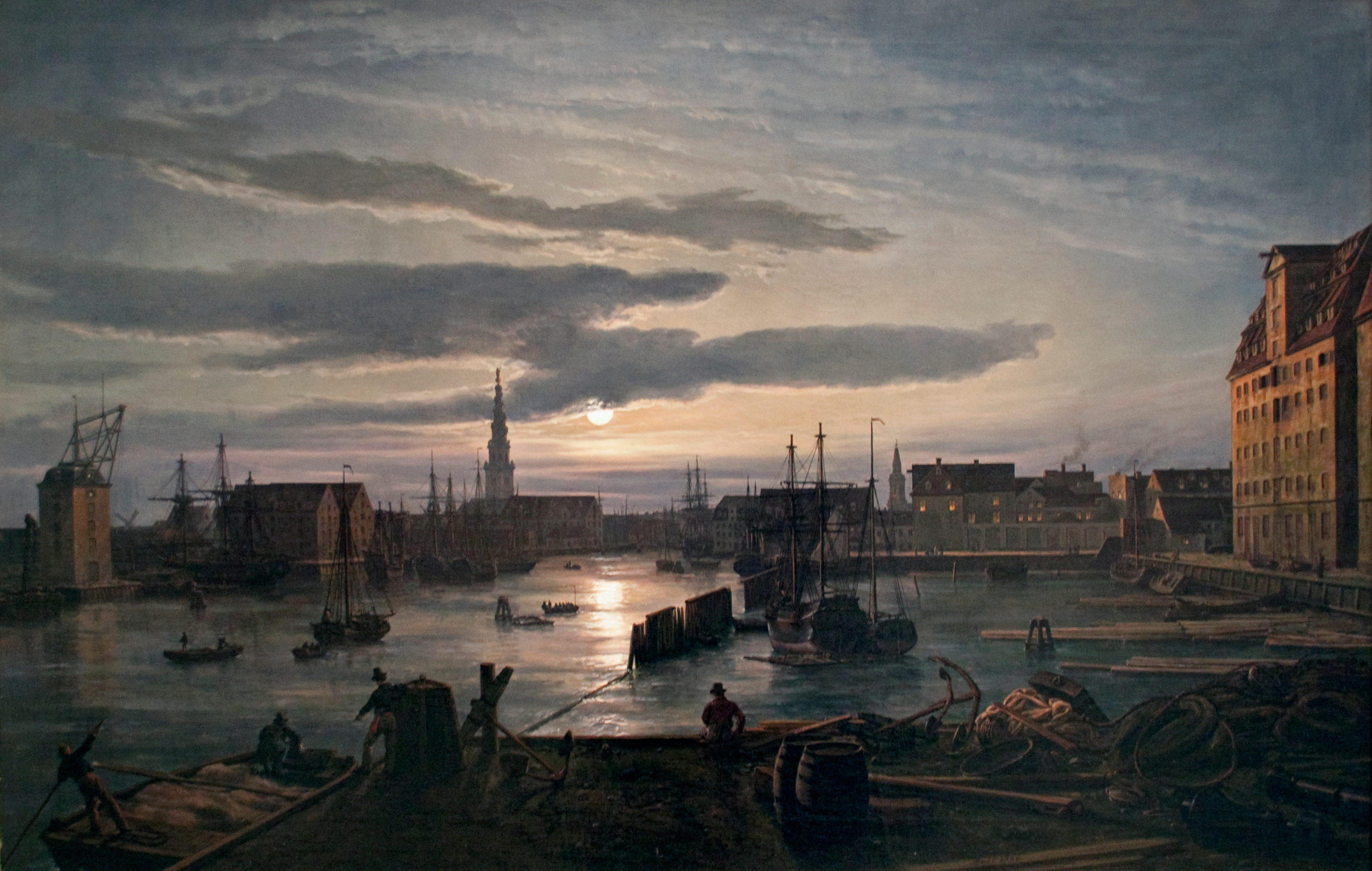
J. C. Dahl: Port of Copenhagen (1846)
Metropolitan Museum, New York

== See also ==
- Big Blue
- Breakwater Crane Railway
- Finnieston Crane
- Fairbairn steam crane
- Kockums Crane
- Left Coast Lifter
- Samson & Goliath
- Taisun
- Titan Clydebank
- Architecture of Denmark
