= Holmen, Copenhagen =

Neighbourhood in Copenhagen, Denmark

Coordinates: 55.68°N 12.6035°E

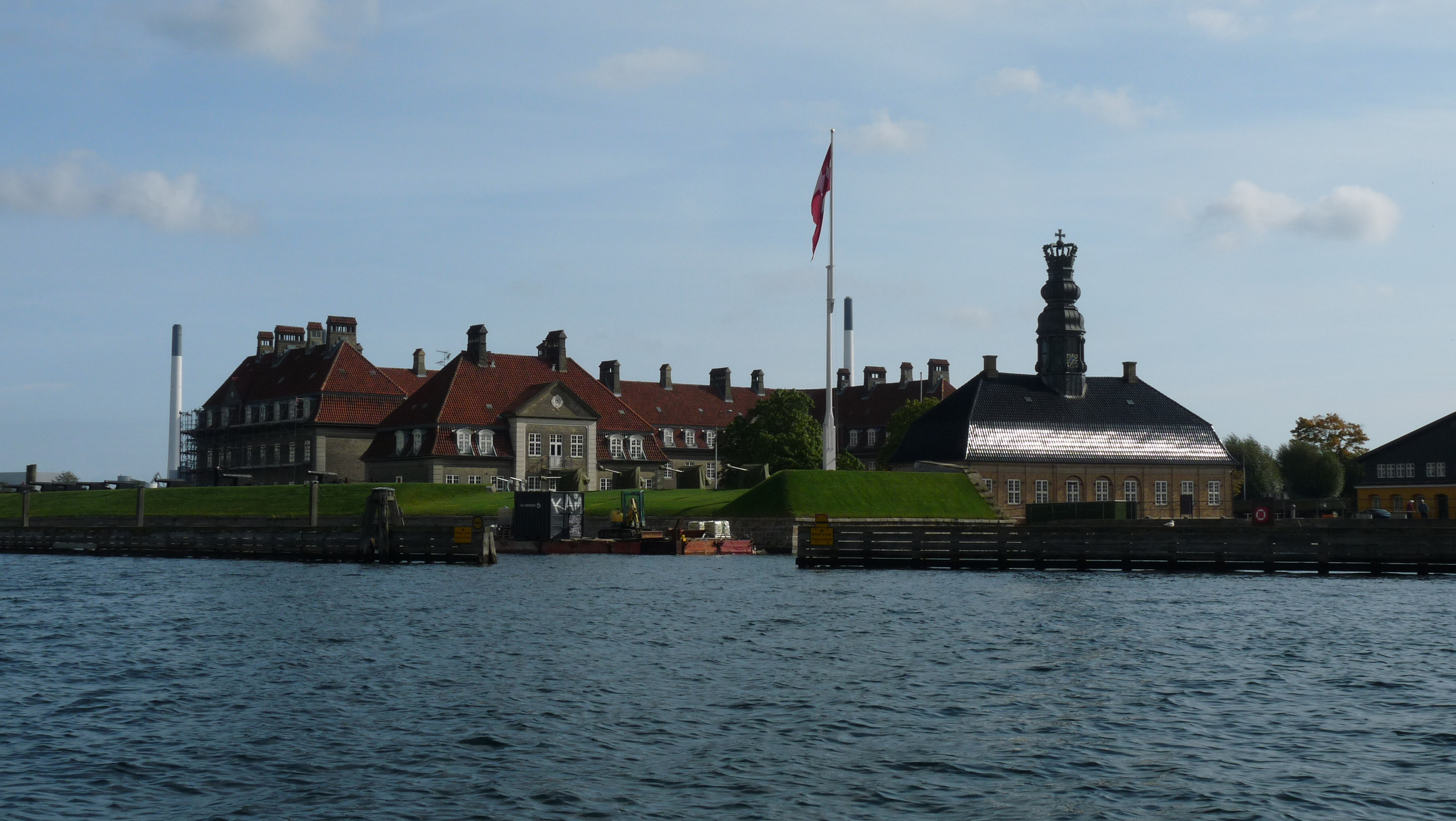
The Central Guard, Nyholm

Holmen (lit. 'The Islet') is a water-bound neighbourhood in Copenhagen, Denmark, occupying the former grounds of the Royal Naval Base and Dockyards. In spite of its name, deceptively in singular, Holmen is a congregation of small islands, forming a north-eastern extension of Christianshavn between Zealand and the northern tip of Amager.

Holmen was created by a series of land reclamations to house the Holmen Naval Base after it was moved from Gammelholm and used to occupy the entire area, but activities have gradually been moved elsewhere. Since the early 1990s, the area has instead been redeveloped for other use as a new district of the city, while the remaining naval facilities are confined to the northernmost islet of Nyholm. The area is today characterized by a mixture of residential developments, creative businesses and educational institutions and remaining military activities. Holmen is also home to the Copenhagen Opera House which was completed in 2005.

Though technically a part of the central Indre By district of Copenhagen, being a cul-de-sac as districts go, the area has a somewhat quiet and "remote" reputation and feel to it.

== Overview ==
Frederiksholm is the area which has seen most new construction since Holmen Naval Base was closed and the area released for redevelopment. Many new buildings have been built while old buildings from the areas naval past have been converted for new uses.

== History ==
=== Creation of Nyholm ===
The existence of Holmen originates in a wish to relocate the Danish Fleet from its earlier home at Bremerholm. Since the city was growing rapidly, it was no longer practical to have the fleet stationed in the centre of the city. Being built out of timber, the vessels constituted a major hazard. Furthermore, the sailors disposed of their garbage by throwing it directly into the harbour, which had developed into a sanitary hazard as well.

In 1680, a plan was conceived to move the fleet out of the city. Responsibility for the plan was given to Admiral Niels Juel.

From 1682–92 Christianshavns Vold was extended northwards to protect the area which had been chosen for the fleet. The extension had seven bastions, named for members of the Royal Family. In Carls and Wilhems Bastion, black powder depots were constructed. Built in 1688 and 1690, they are the oldest structures at Holmen. The northernmost bastion was Charlotte Amalies Bastion, and north of this two cannon batteries were established, "Batteriet Quintus" and "Batteriet Neptunus". The latter's name came from the sunken ship which was the foundation for the battery. This battery was later renamed to "Christiani Sixti Batteri", or "Christian VI's Battery". Today it is known as "Batteriet Sixtus" or just "Sixtus". The sinking of ships continued, loaded with mud from the harbour and trash from Copenhagen's streets. In certain streets, there could be more than one metre of trash, so there was plenty to take. This efforts gradually formed an island, which was given the name Nyholm.

It was to this island that the naval shipyard was relocated. The first ship which was set to sea from this shipyard was the first Dannebrog in 1692. Afterwards, the construction of all large ships was moved to Nyholm, and at Bremerholm, now called Gammelholm, only smaller vessels were built.

After 1692, several ships were built on Nyholm and in 1750, for the first time a Danish king, Frederik V, was wearing a naval uniform in connection with the naming of a new ship. In 1807, following the Second Battle of Copenhagen, the English destroyed three ships at the shipyard, but ship construction continued at Nyholm until 1918, after which ship construction and several other operations were moved to Frederiksholm, which was to the south. The shipyard was separated from the Navy and became a civilian operation with its own director.

=== Creation of Arsenaløen ===
While development on Nyholm continued, a little island called Motzmanns Plads, just north of Christianshavn, was bought. Later it was renamed Christiansholm. A new island was created by new reclamations, just east of Christiansholm. Here a large arsenal was completed in 1770, giving rise to the island's name. Later the island was extended eastwards until reaching its current size in the middle of the 19th century. In 1860 Arsenaløen formed a land connection to Christianshavn, which became the main entrance to Holmen, known as Værftsbrovagten (English: The Yard Bridge Hard). Until then access to Holmen had been by ferry to Christiansholm, from where a bridge connected to Arsenaløen where to Holmen was entered through the King's Gate.

=== Creation of Frederiksholm ===
Around 1750, further reclamations created two small islands south of Nyholm, Balastøen (English: The Ballast Island) and Ankerøen (English: The Anchor Island), along with a larger island, Langøen (English: The Long Island). Bridges were built from Nyholm to Ballastøen, from Ballastøen to Ankerøen and from Ankerøen to Langøen. From Langøen's southern tip, a bridge was built to Arsenaløen. This happened towards the end of the 18th century. At this point, all of Holmen's islands were connected. East from Langøen, an atoll was found called "Mudderøen (English: The Mud Island). This area was reclaimed and annexed to Langeø, which at this stage was renamed Frederiksholm. In 1789 Frederiksholm had reached its current size.

The original intention was to use the new area for barracks for Navy personnel, but this plan was abandoned. Instead, a number of other buildings were built on the island, including storages for ship masts. After the Gunboat War, a row of boathouses were made for the storage of gunboats.

When Gammelholm was finally decommissioned by the Navy in 1869, most activities were moved to Frederiksholm, and in 1918 the shipyard at Nyholm was moved to Frederiksholm and the adjoining Dokøen.

=== Creation of Dokøen ===
Land reclamations west of Langeø (Frederiksholm) and north of Christiansholm led to the establishment of two new islands for the storage of anchors and ships ballast after the first Anchor and Ballast Islands had become part of Nyholm. By further reclamations, they grew together and in 1858 a large drydock was constructed at the island as a replacement for Gammel Dok at Christianshavn. After this, the island became known as Dokøen (English: The Dock Island). In 1925 the island was annexed to Frederiksholm but kept its own name.

=== Closure of the naval base and redevelopment ===
From 1690 to 1993 Holmen was the main base of the Royal Danish Navy. After World War II, two new bases were established in Korsør and Frederikshavn but even though more and more activities were relocated there, Holmen retained its status. In 1981 the naval shipyard closed. On 1 May 1993, the Holmen Naval Base was closed.

== Historic buildings ==
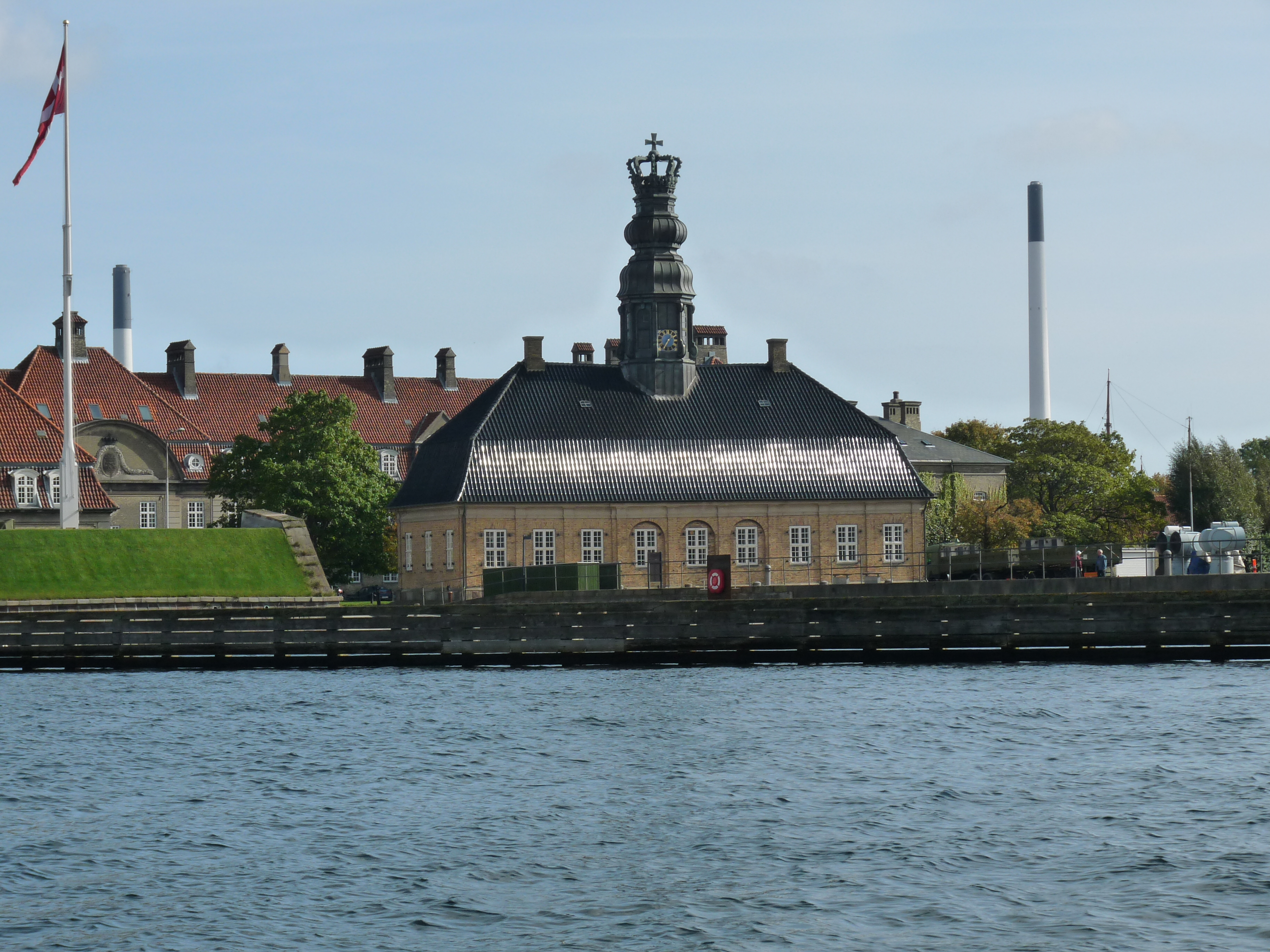
Nyholm Central Guardhouse

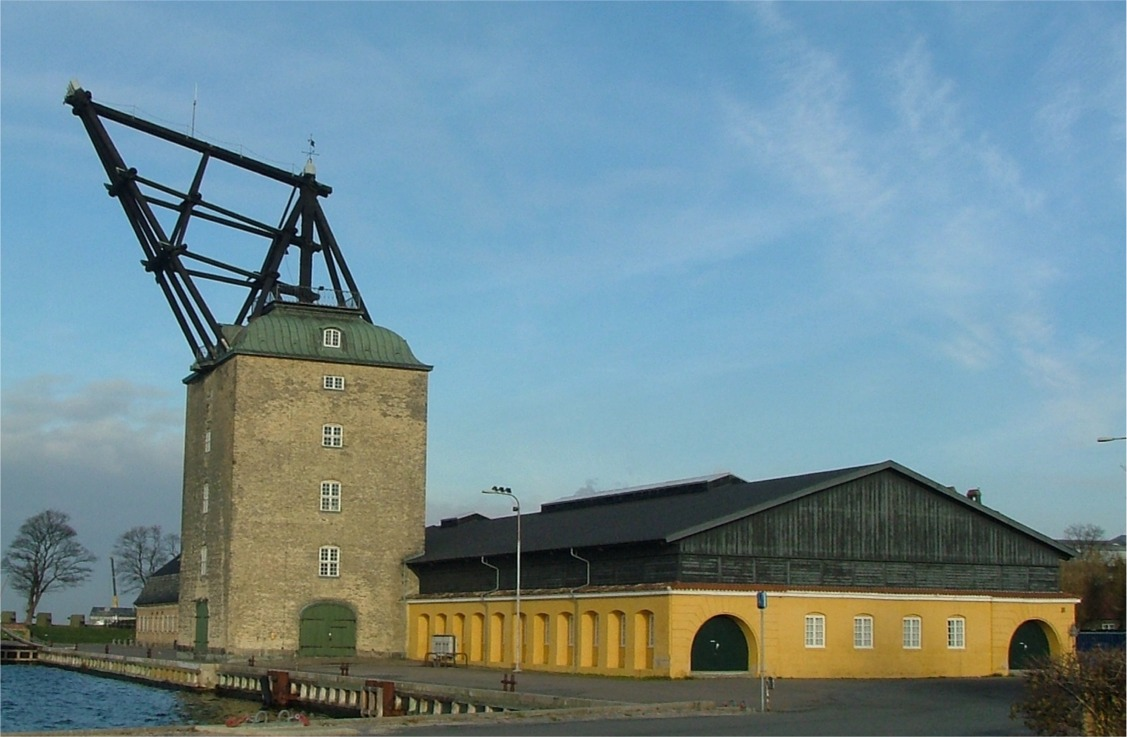
The north side of the building

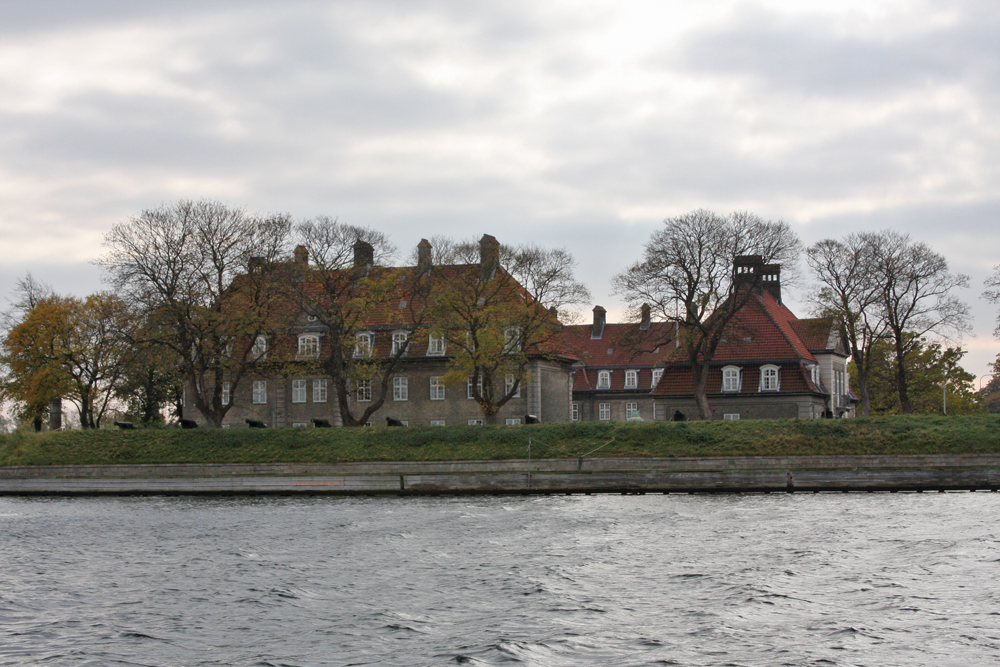
The Barracks at Nyholm

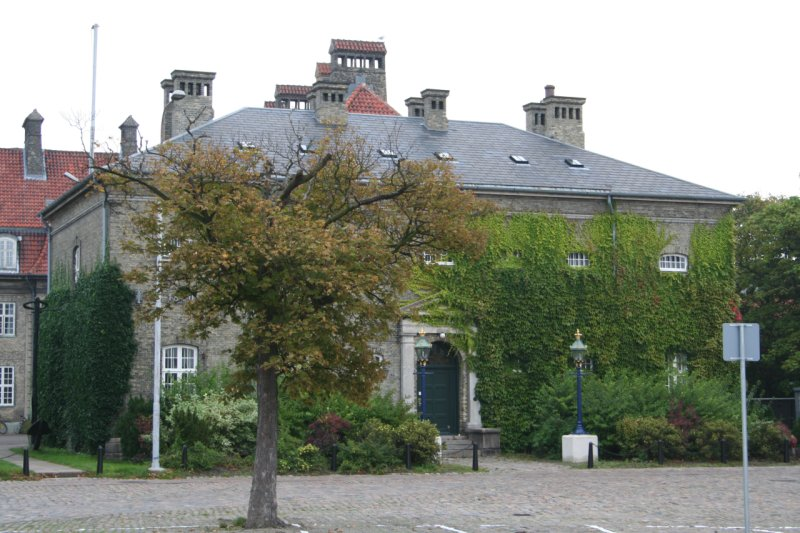
The jailhouse

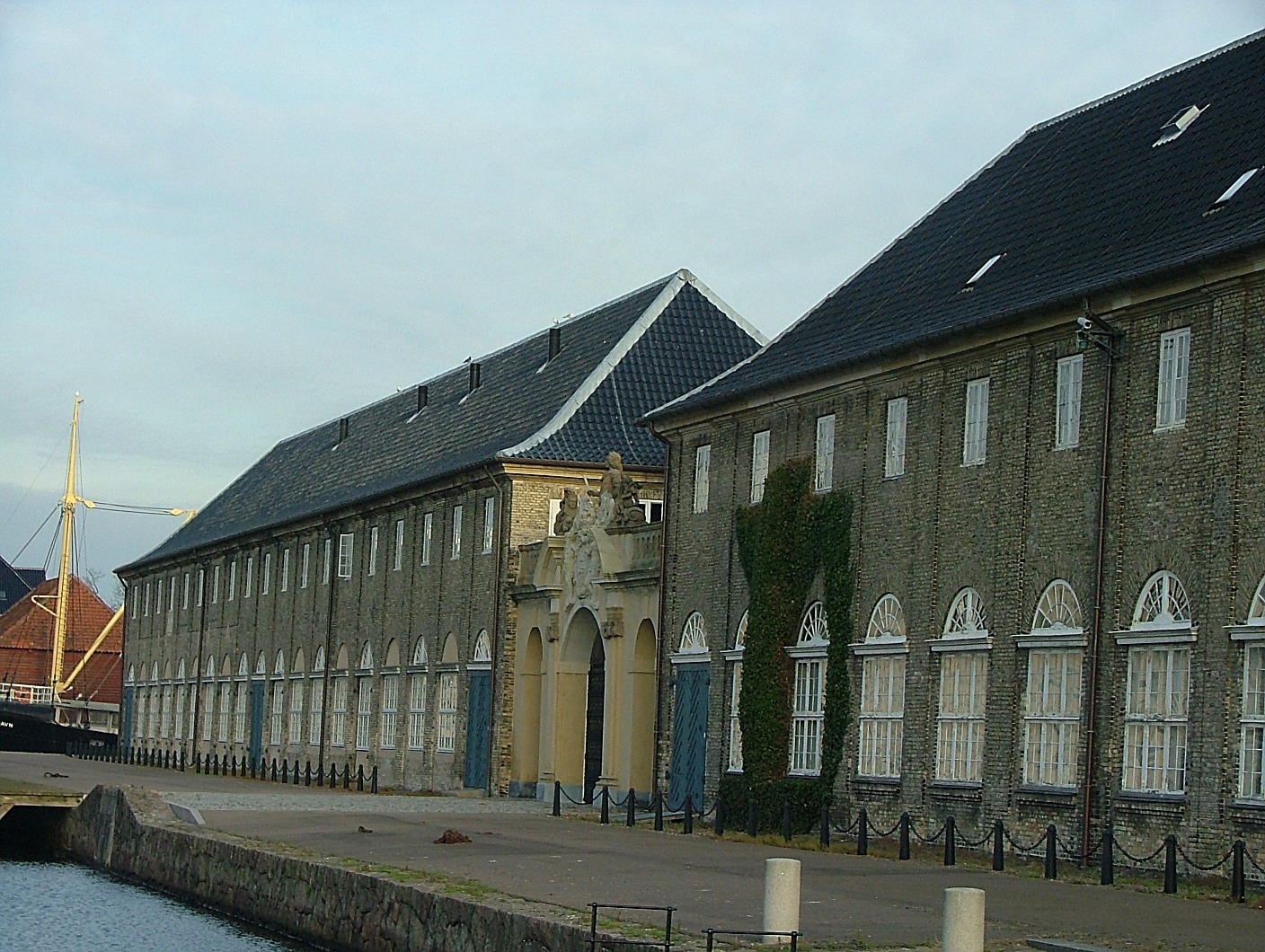
The Arsenal at Arsenaløen

=== Central guardhouse ===
Being the oldest part of Holmen, Nyholm generally has the oldest buildings. These include the Central Guardhouse. The first guardhouse at Nyholm was located inside the Neptune Battery (now Sixtus Battery). When the building had become outdated and the grounds were being restructured, Naval Secretary Frederik Danneskiold-Samsøe proposed the construction of a new building to King Christian VI. The plans were approved in February 1744 and the project was assigned to Philip de Lange who served as Naval Master Builder for almost 30 years and also contributed with many other buildings at Nyholm, and the building was completed the following year. It guarded the passage between the Custom House and Nyholm. It was also used for receiving important guests to the naval base.

=== Masting Sheer and Plan Building ===
Just east of the guardhouse stands the Masting Sheer which was also designed by Lange and completed in 1751. Earlier the building of sailing ships had not required sheers to erect their mast, as it could be lifted into place by ropes and allowed to pivot around its foot. As ships became larger, it was no longer possible to mount their masts, taller and heavier, in this fashion. A crane was needed, tall enough to lift the entire mast vertically and then lower it into the ship. It was as a consequence of this development that the Masting Crane on Nyholm was erected in 1748–51. In the late 19th century, the increasing size and capacity of general harbour cranes began to overlap with the lofty but lightweight masting sheers and so their specialisation was no longer required.

=== Barracks ===
The Barracks complex was built in 1908-10, replacing the previous, outdated living quarters on decommissioned ships.

== Nyholm ==
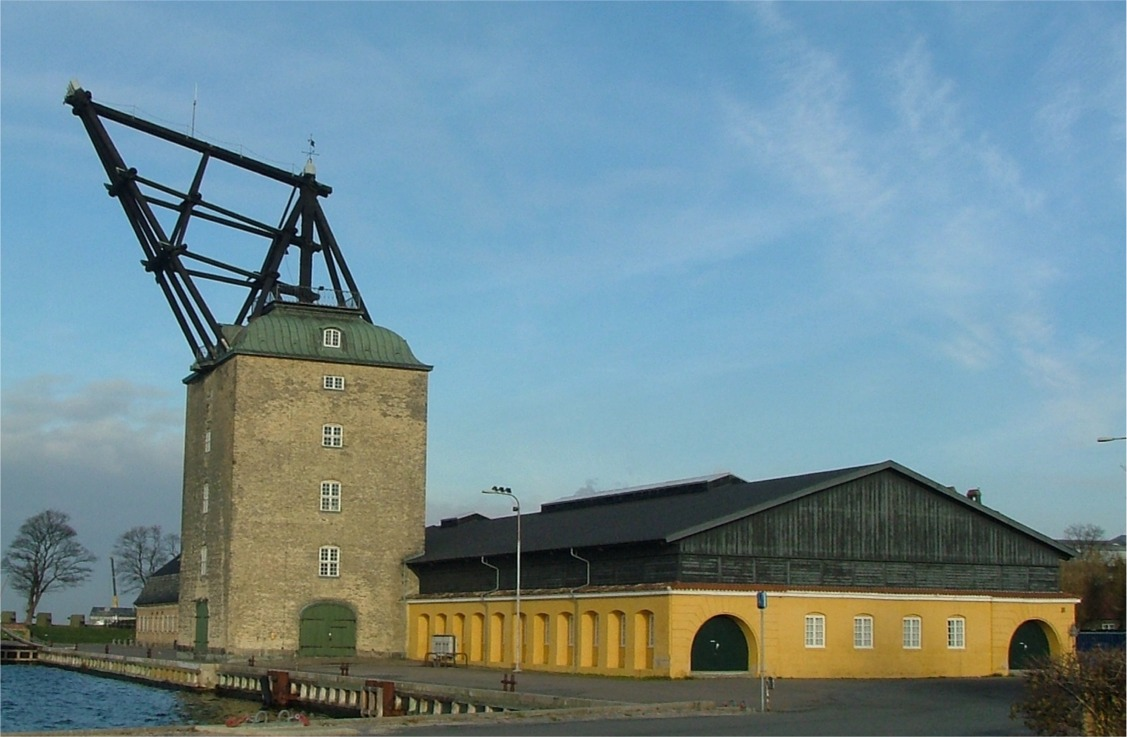
The Masting Sheer and the Design Building

As the only part of Holmen, Nyholm is still a military area. Access to the area is therefore restricted. However, the public is allowed to enter Nyholm from sunrise (not earlier than 8 am though) to sunset. Sunset is marked by a single shot from a cannon at the Sixtus Battery. Among the institutions located at Nyholm is the Royal Danish Naval Academy.

=== Buildings & features ===
==== Frederik V's Masting Sheer ====
Frederik V's Masting Sheer is a masting sheer built in 1748–51 to the design of Philip de Lange. It was used by the shipyard for the mounting of masts.

==== Planbygningen ====
Planbygningen (English: The Design Building) was used for the design and carving of frames. The building had the capacity to contain all frames for two whole naval vessels. It was built in 1764 as a replacement for an older building with the same function and is annexed to the masting sheer.

==== Nyholm Central Guard ====
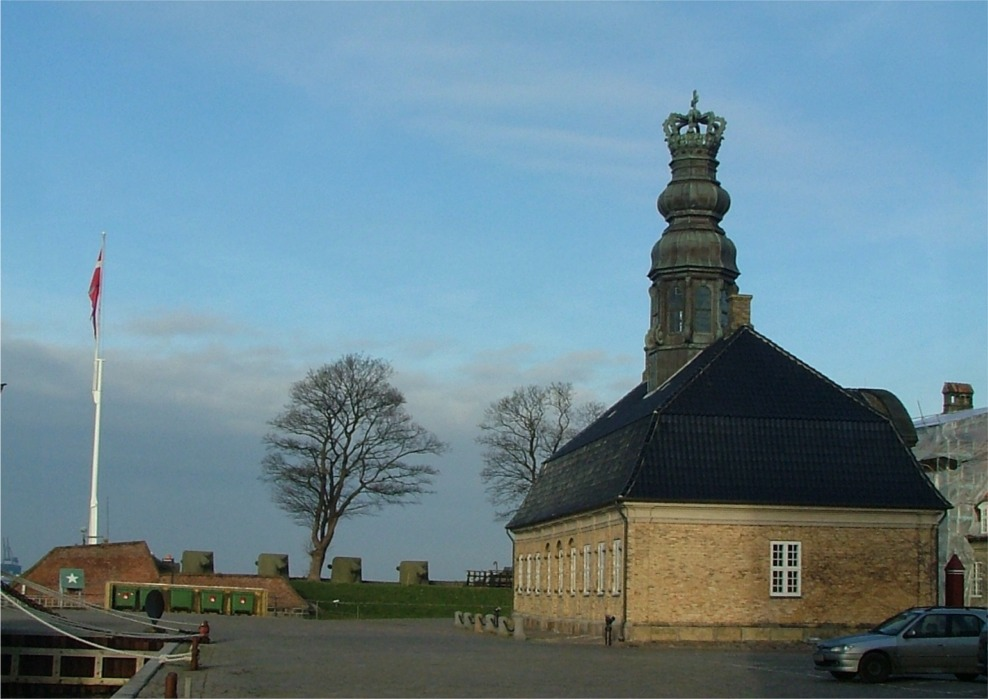
The Central Guard

Nyholm Central Guard (Danish: Nyholm Hovedvagt) is a guardhouse from 1744 designed by Phillipe de Lange. It has a characteristic tower featuring a clock and with a crown atop. For many years it was simply referred to as "Under Uret" (English: "Beneath the Clock"). The crown at the top was reused in the design of the spire for Christiansborg Palace. However, in connection with a renovation in 1934, two more crowns were added to the original spire at Christiansborg, making the resemblance somewhat less obvious.

==== Batteriet Sixtus ====
Batteriet Sixtus (English: The Sixtus Battery) is a small fortification of earthworks on the northern part of Nyholm. It is from here that official cannon salutes are fired at special events.

== Military presence ==
The remains of the naval base, now known as Marinestation København is now confined to Nyholm which is also home to the Royal Danish Naval Academy. The Defence Command has been based in the Arsenal complex at Arsenaløen since 2005.

== The creative cluster ==
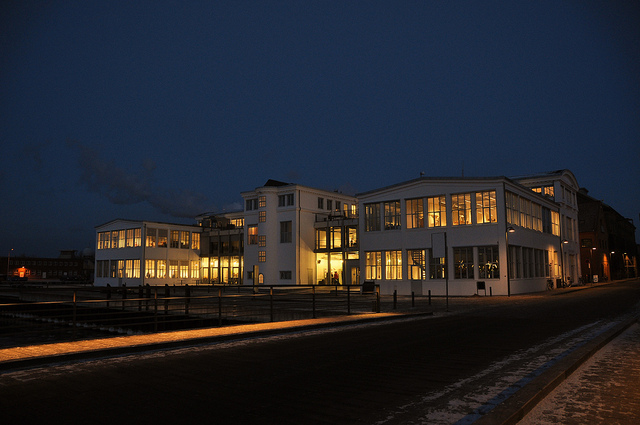
Danish Design School

Since the Navy closed down its activities and Holmen was released for redevelopment, Holmen has become home to one of the largest creative clusters in Copenhagen. A Centre for Creative Educations has been established on the eas side of Frederiksholm, mostly in converted naval buildings. It encompasses the Design School, the Architecture School, the Rhythmic Music Conservatory, the Danish Film School and the Theatre & Contemporary Dance School. They are all located in buildings of the former naval shipyard along the eastern shore of Frederiksholm.

The 32 former Gunboat Sheds today house small business mainly in the creative sector, such advertising agencies, media houses and architectural practices.

== Residential redevelopment ==
Holmen has been subject to comprehensive redevelopment since the Navy closed down most of its activities.

== Ships ==
=== The Royal Yacht ===
When the royal yacht Dannebrog is not at sea, it ties up at Elefanten (The Elephant), a pier which extends south from the northern tip of Nyholm, next to the Central Guardhouse. The pier is named for the naval vessel Elephanten which was scuttled at the site to create it. The royal family cross the harbour on the royal barge which moors at Nordre Toldbod, just north of Amalienborg Palace.

=== Museum ships ===
Also berthed at the pier are three decommissioned naval ships of the Cold War which now serve as museum ships. During opening hours visitors are free to walk around the largest of the ships, FDMS Peder Skram, a Peder Skram class frigate, while the two others, HDMS Sælen, a submarine, and HDMS Sehested a Willemoes-class missile boat can only be visited on tours. They start every 30 minutes during opening hours and are available in English.

=== Georg Stage ===
Holmen is also home to Georg Stage, a fully rigged, three-masted sailing ship which serves as a training platform for Danish sailors. She was launched 1934 as a replacement of another ship by the same name which now serves as a museum ship at Mystic Seaport in the United States. Georg Stage is moored in the canal between Nyholm and Frederiksholm when she is in Copenhagen.

== See also ==
- Industrial Heritage Sites of Denmark
