= Helinä Häkkänen =

Finnish psychologist

Helinä Häkkänen (born 26 April 1971 in Helsinki) is a Finnish psychologist (PhD), Adjunct Professor of legal and criminal psychology, psychotherapist, EMDR supervisor and an author. She works as an expert at Mindroot Ltd, which she founded in 2020, and as a docent of criminal psychology at the University of Helsinki and as a docent of legal psychology at the University of Eastern Finland.

Häkkänen received her PhD in psychology from the University of Helsinki in 2000. From 2000 to 2002, she worked as a postdoctoral researcher at the Academy of Finland at the Police University College, from where she moved to the Finnish National Bureau of Investigation (NBI) as an Academy researcher. From 2002 to 2011, Häkkänen worked there as an expert on behavioral investigative advisor and criminal profiler. She has also collaborated with the FBI and police and prosecutors in various countries (including Sweden, Estonia, the United Kingdom, Australia, Latvia, Ireland and Belgium); leading, among other things, a multinational EU-funded project on combating organized crime using psychology. Since 2002, Häkkänen has led the Forensic Psychology research group at the University of Helsinki, currently also focusing on topics in the applied field of Behavioral Economics & Law.

Häkkänen is considered as one of Finland's leading experts in legal psychology and criminal psychology and she has a prolific publishing record. After leaving the NBI, Häkkänen worked as the CEO of a law firm she had founded in 2011, until January 2021. Since 2021 at Mindroot Ltd she has worked as an expert in violent and war crime for the police, the prosecution and the courts. She cooperates with the International Criminal Court. Häkkänen has over 60 articles published in international and domestic scientific journals. Her scientific articles deal with, among other things, violent behavior, psychopathy, police investigation, and stress related to legal proceedings. She has written and edited six non-fiction books on, on psychopathy, narcissism, and violent behavior, and has appeared in television series such as Finnautti, the profiler film Gaze into Abyss, Riku Rantala and M/S Mystery, and Riku Rantala and the Crimes That Stirred Up Finland. She has been a guest on several podcasts, including Psykopodiaa, Finland Nordic Noir, and Futucast. Her latest book, Profiloija (engl. The Profiler), became a bestseller in Finland. In February 2026, her next non-fiction book, The Anatomy of a Finnish Homicide will be published by Bazar Publishing Company.

== Selected works ==
- "Psychopathy, Homicide, and the Courts: Working the System" Criminal Justice and Behavior, Vol. 36 No. 8 (August 2009), pp 761–777
- "Finnish sexual homicides: Offence and offender characteristics" Forensic Science International, Vol. 188 No. 1 (2009), pp 125–130
- "Homicides with Mutilation of the Victim's Body" Journal of Forensic Sciences, Vol. 54 No. 4 (July 2009), pp 933–937
- "Gender differences in Finnish homicide offence characteristics" Forensic Science International, Vol. 186 No. 1 (2009), pp 75–80
- Psychopathy in Families: Implications for Clinical Interviews and Civil Proceedings Wiley Online Library
- Psychopathy in Economical Crime, Organized Crime, and War Crimes Wiley Online Library
- Psychopathy and law: a practitioner's guide Malden, Massachusetts: Wiley-Blackwell (2012)
