= Holmen Naval Base =

Naval base in Copenhagen, Denmark

Coordinates: 55°40′48.01″N 12°36′12.77″E

Naval Station Holmen
- Holmen, Copenhagen, Denmark
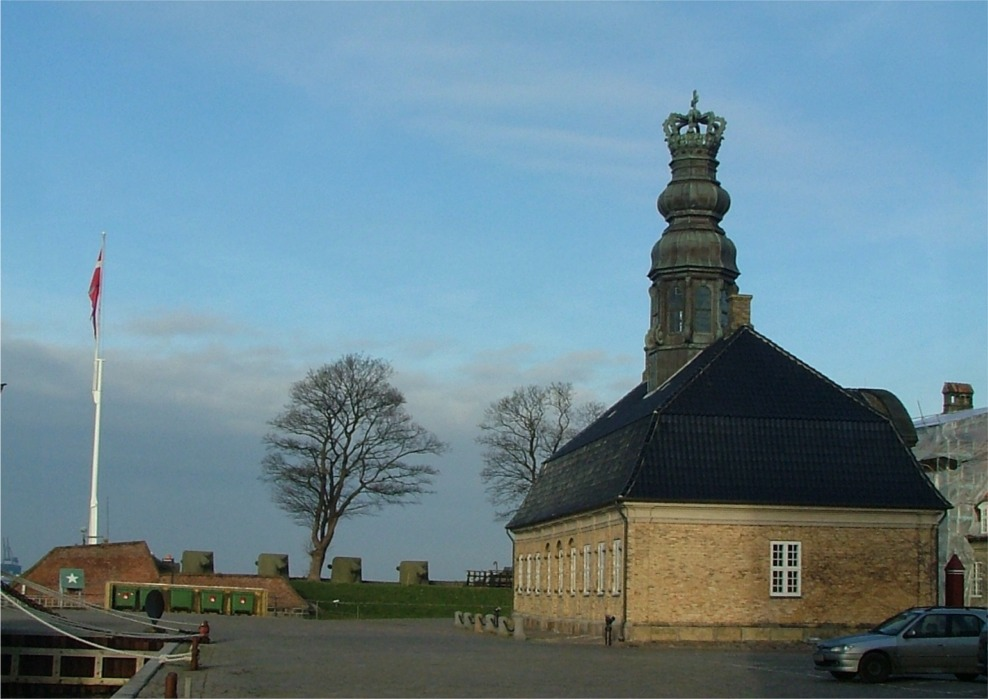
- Nyholm's Central Guard in the foreground with the salutory cannons of the Sixtus Battery in the background

Site information
- Type: Military base
- Controlled by: Royal Danish Navy
- Open to the public: yes

Site history
- In use: late 17th century–Present
- Battles/wars: Battle of Copenhagen

Naval Station Holmen (Danish: Flådestation Holmen) is one of several naval stations of the Royal Danish Navy, supplementing the two Danish naval bases in Frederikshavn and Korsør.

Founded in the late 17th century, it is also a visitor attraction with many historical buildings that has played a vital role in the history of Denmark as well as Copenhagen.

The naval base used to occupy the entire area of Holmen, which was in fact created by a series of landfills to house it, but is now confined to its northernmost island of Nyholm.

Holmen was for many years the base of command for the Danish Naval Flag and has through the times been called Nyholm (which is the name of one of the islands), the Navy's Base and Naval Station or Naval Base, Copenhagen. It was never actually named Naval Station Holmen (Flådestation Holmen), even though many people not in the Navy have used this name. For over 300 years, the facility at Holmen was Denmark's largest employer. Today the Navy only has a single institution left on Holmen. Since the 1990s, the area has been opened to the public.

== History ==
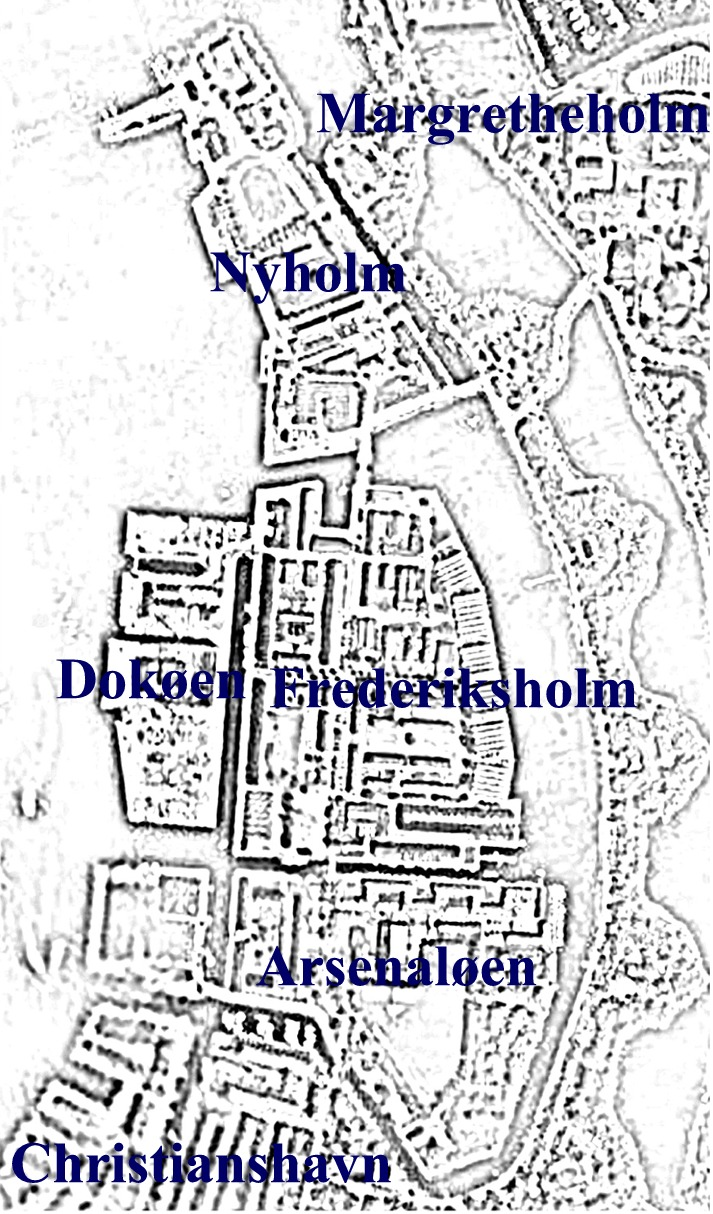
Map of Holmen today

Erik Menved was the first Danish King to establish a naval port in Copenhagen. Later, under the command of Valdemar Atterdag, the fleet was moved to Vordingborg, but Erik of Pommern moved it back to Copenhagen and King Hans built a shipyard in Copenhagen.

Christian IV built a "war port" on Slotsholmen, but the harbour's basin has been filled since and is the site of the Royal Library today. The buildings around the harbour housed supplies for the Navy. As ships started to grow in size, the war port became too small, and the fleet moved to Bremerholm.

Under Christian VI, a dock was established in 1739 at Christianshavn, close to where Strandgade (Beach Street) is today. This dock existed up to 1871 when it was taken over by Copenhagen's Harbor Control, and the docks were filled. The name Gammel Dok (Old Docks) still show where part of the Navy's shipyard was.

=== Nyholm ===
Since the city was growing, it was not practical to have the Navy Fleet stationed in the centre of the city. The ships were, of course, built out of wood and were fire hazards. The seamen on the ships simply threw their waste and trash directly into the harbor, which had a negative impact on the city's health.

In 1680, a plan was made to move the fleet out of the city. Responsibility for the plan was given to Admiral Niels Juel. West of a sandbank called Revshalen, old ships were scuttled after being filled with stones. In 1685, a defence wall with seven bastions was built. The bastions still exist today, and in Carls and Wilhems Bastion, one can still see the original black powder depots. These depots are Holmen's oldest buildings, built in 1688 and 1690. The northern bastion was Charlotte Amalies Bastion, and north of this two cannon batteries were established, "Batteriet Quintus" and "Batteriet Neptunus". The latter's name came from the sunken ship which was the foundation for the battery. This battery was later renamed to "Christiani Sixti Batteri", or "Christian the Sixth's Battery", but is known today as "Batteriet Sixtus" or just "Sixtus". The sinking of ships continued, filled with mud from the harbor and the trash from Copenhagen's streets. In certain streets, there was over a meter of trash, so there was plenty to take. This is how the island given the name Nyholm was created.

On Nyholm, the foundation for a new shipyard was created. The first ship which was set to sea from this shipyard was Dannebrog in 1692. This ship was blown up on October the 4th, 1710, in a battle against the Swedes in Køge Bugt. Afterwards, the constructions of all large ships were moved to Nyholm, and on Gammelholm, only smaller ships were built.

After 1692, several ships were built on Nyholm and in 1750, a Danish king, then Frederik V, wore a naval uniform for the first time in connection with the christening of a new ship. In 1807, following the Battle of Copenhagen, British forces destroyed three unfinished warships within the shipyard at Nyholm, but even though these were poor times for the Navy, ship construction continued at Nyholm. The last ship to be launched from Nyholm was launched in 1918, after which ship construction and several other operations were moved to Frederiksholm, which was to the south. The shipyard was separated from the Navy and became a civilian operation with its own director.

=== Arsenaløen ===
Holmen's southernmost island is Arsenaløen, or Arsenal Island.

While development on Nyholm was continuing, a little island by the name of Motzmanns Plads, just north of Christianshavn, was bought. Later it was renamed to Christiansholm. A new island was created, with landfill, just east of Christianholm, where a large arsenal was built and finished in 1770. Later, this island was named Arsenaløen and was expanded to the east.

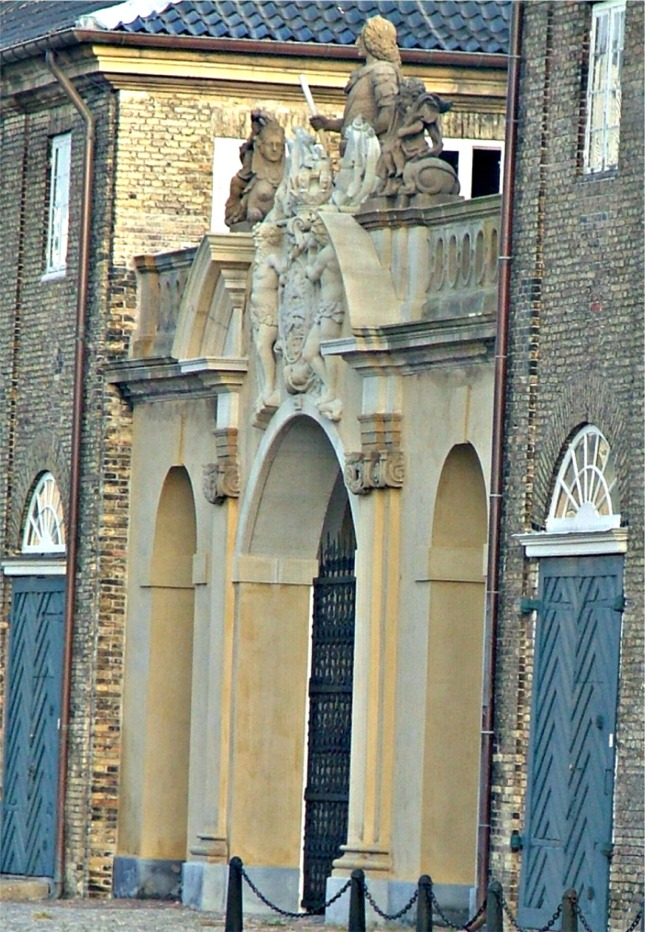
The King's Gate. The gate has recently been restored, but is still hidden behind Christiansholm.

Originally, a main gate existed to Nyholm. Nyholm wasn't just a name for the northernmost island but was the name for the area used by the navy. Access to the area required sailing to Holmen. A ferry sailed to Christiansholm, where one went over a bridge to Arsenaløen. Here, one could go to Nyholm though a gate, which faced the canal between Arsenaløen and Christiansholm. The gate was called "The Kings Gate". It is not visited by many people anymore. This is because in the middle of the 19th century, Arsenaløen formed a land connection with Christianshavn, so a new main entrance was created to Holmen, the so-called Warf Bridge Guard, or Værftsbrovagt. The ferry to Christiansholm stopped and the Kings Gate was no longer used.

=== Frederiksholm ===
Around 1750, dumping of dirt and fill created two small islands south of Nyholm, "Ballastøen" and "Ankerøen", along with a larger island, "Langøen". From Nyholm, a bridge was built to Ballastøen and from Ballastøen to Ankerøen and from Ankerøen to Langøen. From Langøen's southern end, a bridge was built to Arsenaløen. This happened in the later part of the 18th century. At this point, all of Holmen's islands were connected. East from Langøen, an atoll was found called "Mudderøen"; the area between Mudderøen (including Mudderøen itself) and Langøen was filled, and "Frederiksholm" was created. This area was supposed to become a residential area for Navy personnel, but this plan was never followed through. Instead, the area became a storage area for ship masts, along with a row of other buildings on the island. After the Gunboat War, slips were made for the storage of cannon ships. When Nyholm, as mentioned, was expanded together with Ballastøen and Ankerøen to present day Nyholm, Ankerøen and Ballastøen were replaced with Ballasø and Ankerø, which were created west of Frederiksholm.

== Visitor attractions ==
- Mastekranen
- Nyholms Hovedvagt
- HDMS Sælen Museum Submarine
- Peder Skram Museum Fregate

== See also ==
- Holmen
