= HDMS Peter Tordenskiold (F356) =

Niels Juel-class corvette

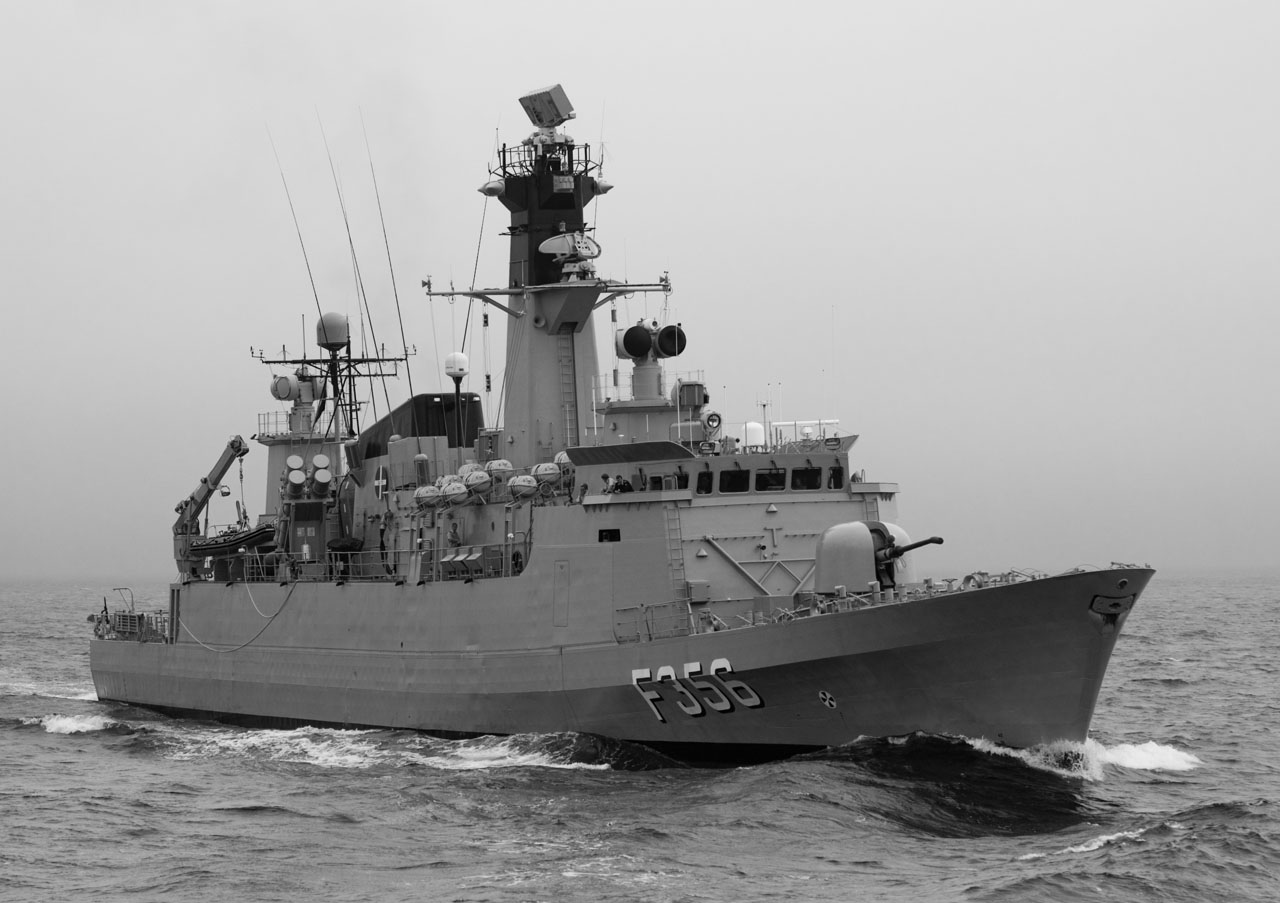
- HDMS Peter Tordenskiold underway on 4 September 2007

History

Denmark
- Name: Peter Tordenskiold
- Namesake: Peter Tordenskjold
- Builder: Aalborg Værft, Aalborg
- Laid down: 3 December 1979
- Launched: 30 April 1980
- Commissioned: 2 April 1982
- Decommissioned: 18 August 2009
- Identification: Callsign: OUET; Pennant number: F356
- Fate: Scrapped, 2013
- Badge

General characteristics
- Class & type: Niels Juel-class corvette
- Displacement: 1,450 tonnes
- Length: 84 m (276 ft)
- Beam: 10.3 m (34 ft)
- Draft: 4.8 m (16 ft)
- Installed power: 25,700 shp (19,200 kW) gas turbine; 4,800 bhp (3,600 kW) on diesel engine
- Propulsion: 1 × General Electric gas turbine; 1 × MTU diesel engine
- Speed: 30 knots (56 km/h; 35 mph) (with turbine)
- Range: 4,000 nautical miles (7,400 km; 4,600 mi) at 18 knots (33 km/h; 21 mph); 1,020 nautical miles (1,890 km; 1,170 mi) at 28 knots (52 km/h; 32 mph)
- Endurance: 25 days
- Complement: 93 standard; 110 during operations
- Armament: Harpoon SSM; Sea Sparrow SAM VLS; Stinger SAM; Oto Melara 76 mm gun; several heavy machine guns and a number of depth charges

HDMS Peter Tordenskiold (F356) was a Niels Juel-class corvette in the Royal Danish Navy which was in use until 1990. The ship was named after Peter Tordenskjold, a 17th-century Dano-Norwegian vice admiral.

== Design ==
The corvettes were fitted with an Otobreda 76 mm main gun, two quad RGM-84C Harpoon Surface-to-surface missile (SSM) launchers, a Mod 3 VLS Sea Sparrow Surface-to-air missile (SAM) launcher carrying 12 missiles, two FIM-92A Stinger SAM launchers, two 20 mm Oerlikon anti-aircraft guns, seven 12.7 mm M/01 LvSa machine guns, and a Mark 3 Depth charge launcher.

Olfert Fischer's radar suite consisted of two Terma Scanter Mil 009 units for navigation, an EADS TRS-3D air search unit, and a CelsiusTech 9GR 600 surface search unit. Fire control was provided by a CelsiusTech 9 LV 200 gun radar, and a General Dynamics Mk 95 missile radar. She was fitted with a Plessey PMS-26 hull-mounted sonar. The corvette was fitted with a Rascall Cutlass B-1 intercept unit, a Telgon HFD/F unit, and four 6-round Seagnat Mk 36 chaff launchers.

== Construction and career ==
She was laid down on 3 December 1979 and launched on 30 April 1980 by Aalborg Værft, Aalborg. Commissioned on 2 April 1982.

Peter Tordenskjold was decommissioned in 2009 and was scrapped by Lindø shipyard in February 2013.

== Gallery ==
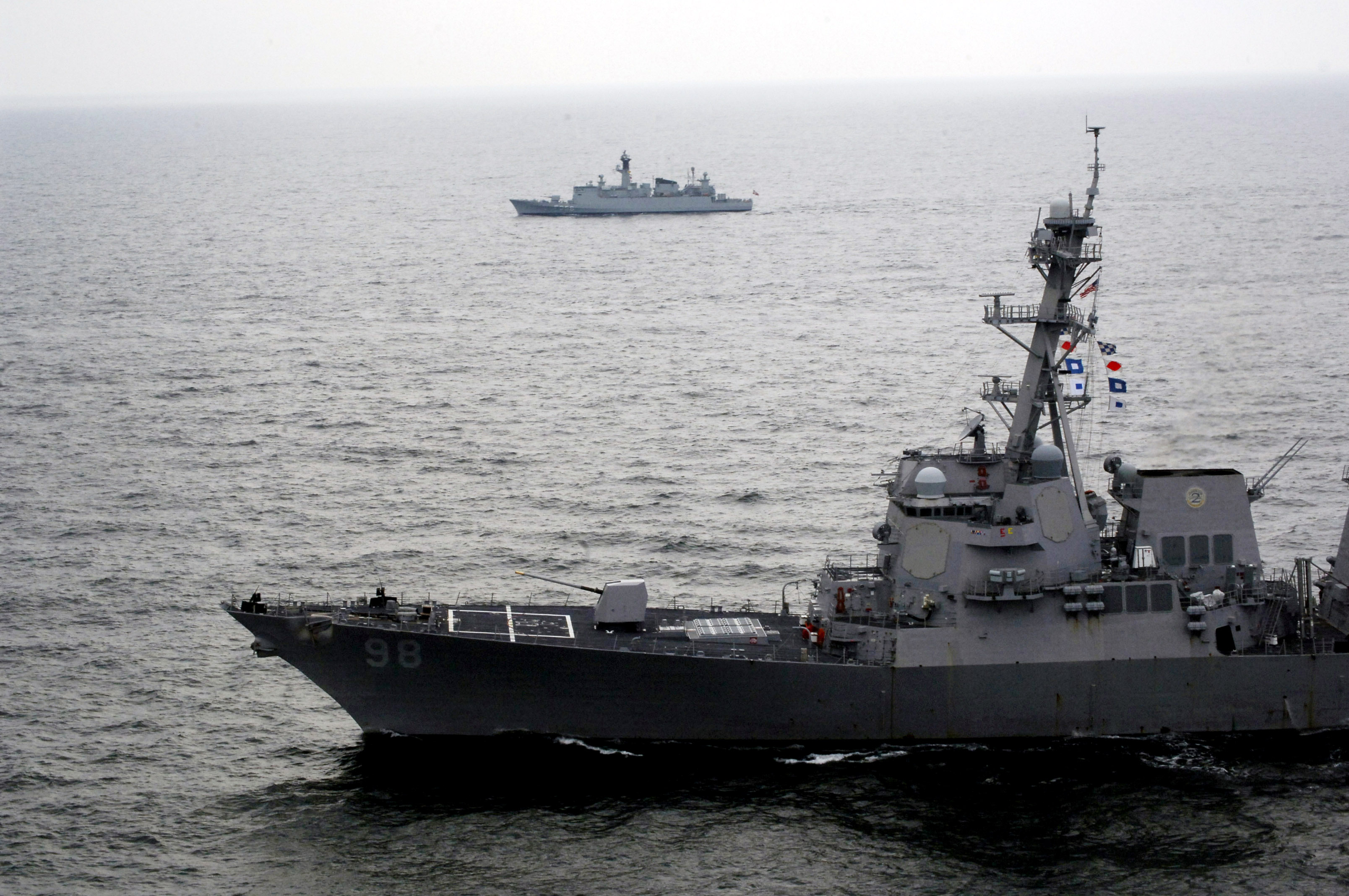
HDMS Peter Tordenskiold alongside USS Forrest Sherman during BALTOPS 2009.

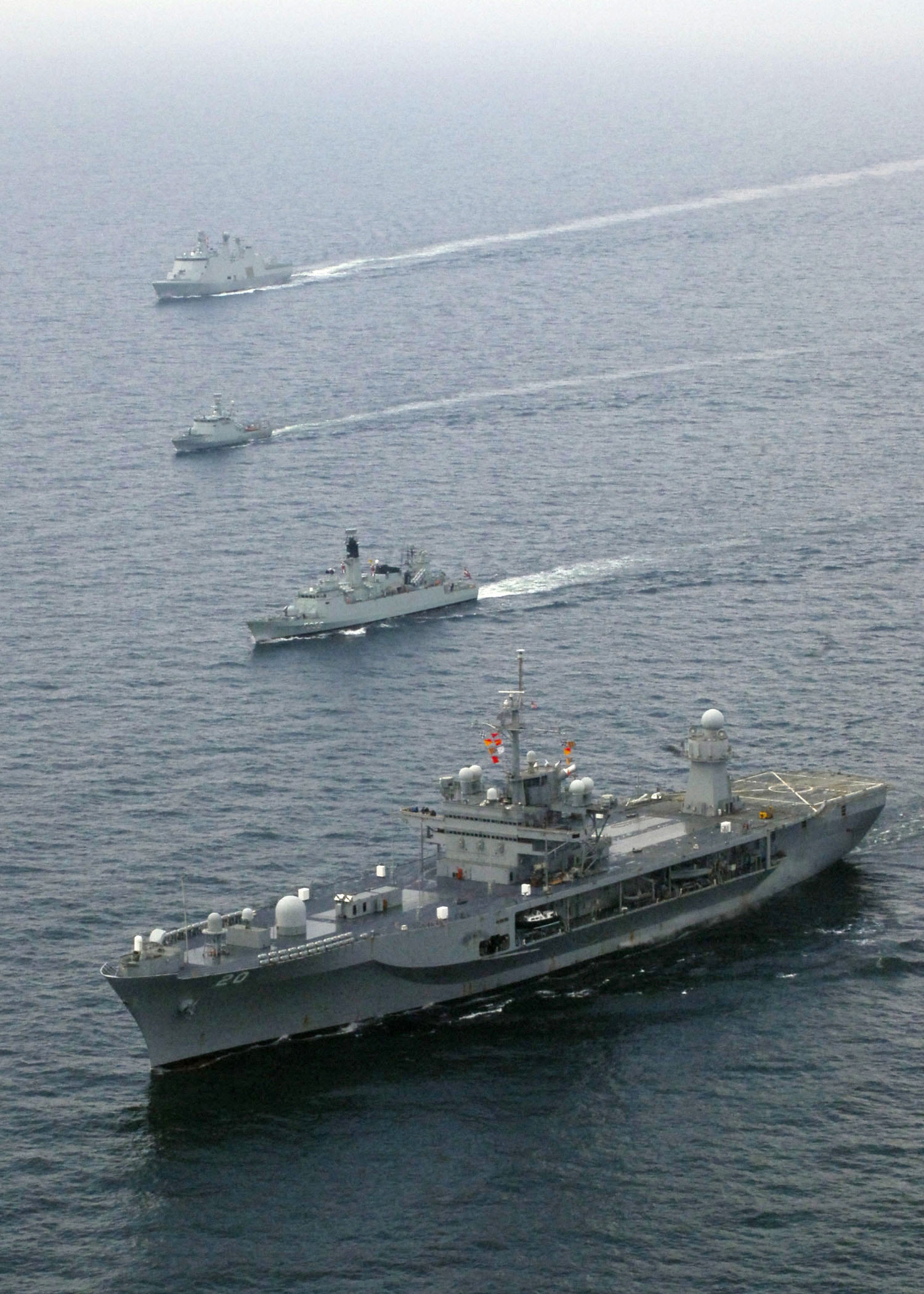
HDMS Peter Tordenskiold, HDMS Esbern Snare, HDMS Glenten and USS Mount Whitney during BALTOPS 2009.

== See also ==
- HDMS Olfert Fischer (F355)
- HDMS Niels Juel (F354)
