= HDMS Niels Juel (F354) =

Niels Juel-class corvette

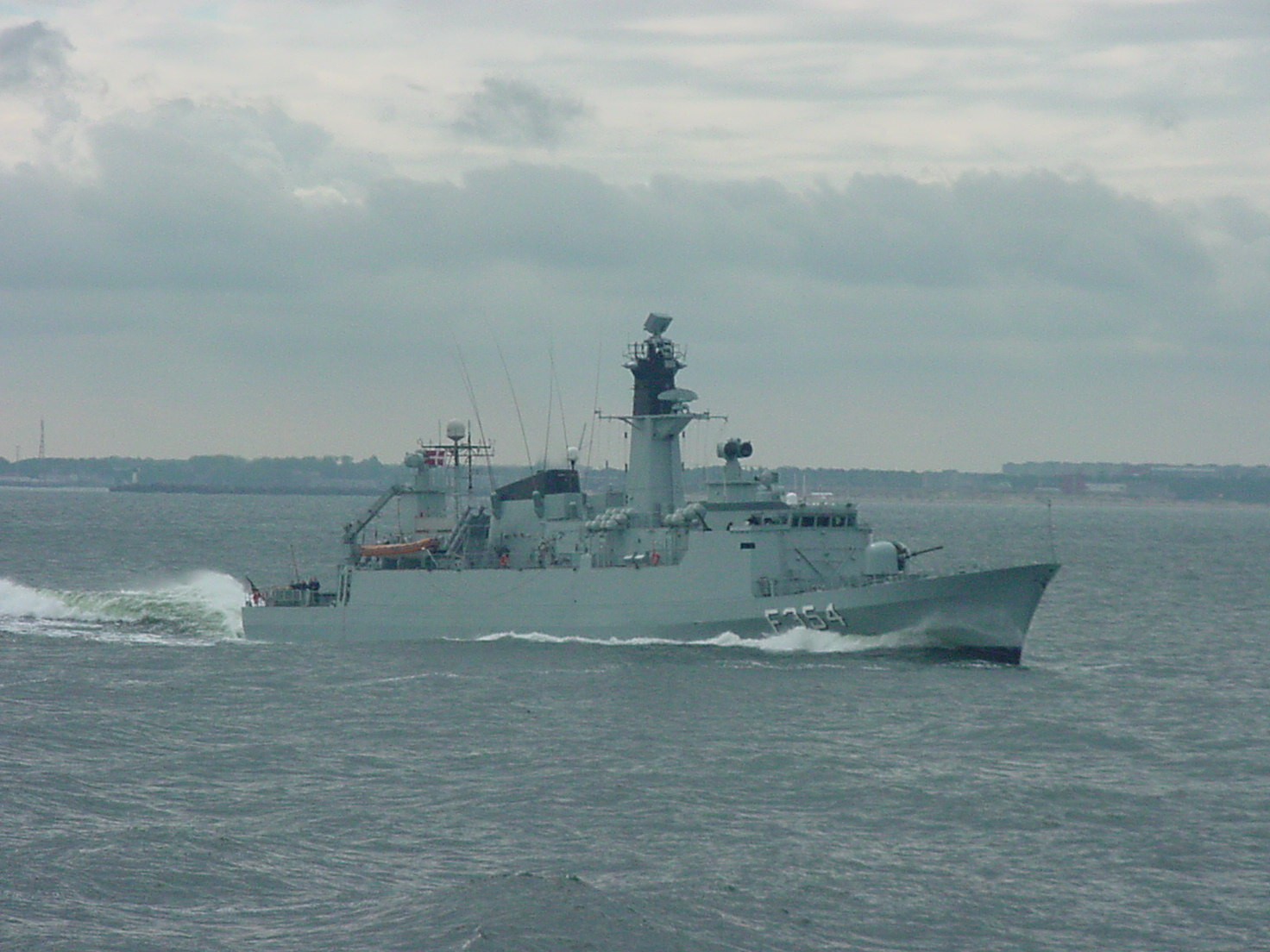
- HDMS Niels Juel underway on 6 June 2005

History

Denmark
- Name: Niels Juel
- Namesake: Niels Juel
- Builder: Aalborg Værft, Aalborg
- Laid down: 20 October 1977
- Launched: 17 February 1978
- Commissioned: 26 August 1980
- Decommissioned: 18 August 2009
- Identification: Callsign: OUER; Pennant number: F354
- Fate: Scrapped, 2013
- Badge

General characteristics
- Class & type: Niels Juel-class corvette
- Displacement: 1,450 tonnes
- Length: 84 m (275 ft 7 in)
- Beam: 10.3 m (33 ft 10 in)
- Draft: 4.8 m (15 ft 9 in)
- Installed power: 25,700 shp (19,200 kW) gas turbine; 4,800 bhp (3,600 kW) on diesel engine
- Propulsion: 1 × General Electric gas turbine; 1 × MTU diesel engine
- Speed: 30 knots (56 km/h; 35 mph) (with turbine)
- Range: 4,000 nmi (7,400 km; 4,600 mi) at 18 knots (33 km/h; 21 mph); 1,020 nmi (1,890 km; 1,170 mi) at 28 knots (52 km/h; 32 mph)
- Endurance: 25 days
- Complement: 93 standard; 110 during operations
- Armament: Harpoon SSM; Sea Sparrow SAM VLS; Stinger SAM; Oto Melara 76 mm gun; several heavy machine guns and a number of depth charges

HDMS Niels Juel (F354) was a Niels Juel-class corvette in the Royal Danish Navy which was in use until 1990. The ship was named after Niels Juel, a 17th-century Danish admiral.

== Design ==
The corvettes were fitted with an Otobreda 76 mm main gun, two quad RGM-84C Harpoon surface-to-surface missile (SSM) launchers, a MK 48 Mod 3 VLS Sea Sparrow surface-to-air missile (SAM) launcher carrying 12 missiles, two FIM-92A Stinger SAM launchers, two 20 mm Oerlikon anti-aircraft guns, seven 12.7 mm M/01 LvSa machine guns, and a Mark 3 depth charge launcher.

Niels Juel's radar suite consisted of two Terma Scanter Mil 009 units for navigation, an EADS TRS-3D air search unit, and a CelsiusTech 9GR 600 surface search unit. Fire control was provided by a CelsiusTech 9 LV 200 gun radar, and a General Dynamics Mk 95 missile radar. She was fitted with a Plessey PMS-26 hull-mounted sonar. The corvette was fitted with a Rascall Cutlass B-1 intercept unit, a Telgon HFD/F unit, and four 6-round Seagnat Mk 36 chaff launchers.

== Construction and career ==
She was laid down on 20 October 1977 and launched on 17 February 1978 by Aalborg Værft, Aalborg. The vessel was commissioned on 26 August 1980.

Niels Juel was decommissioned in 2009 and was scrapped by Lindø shipyard in February 2013.

== Gallery ==
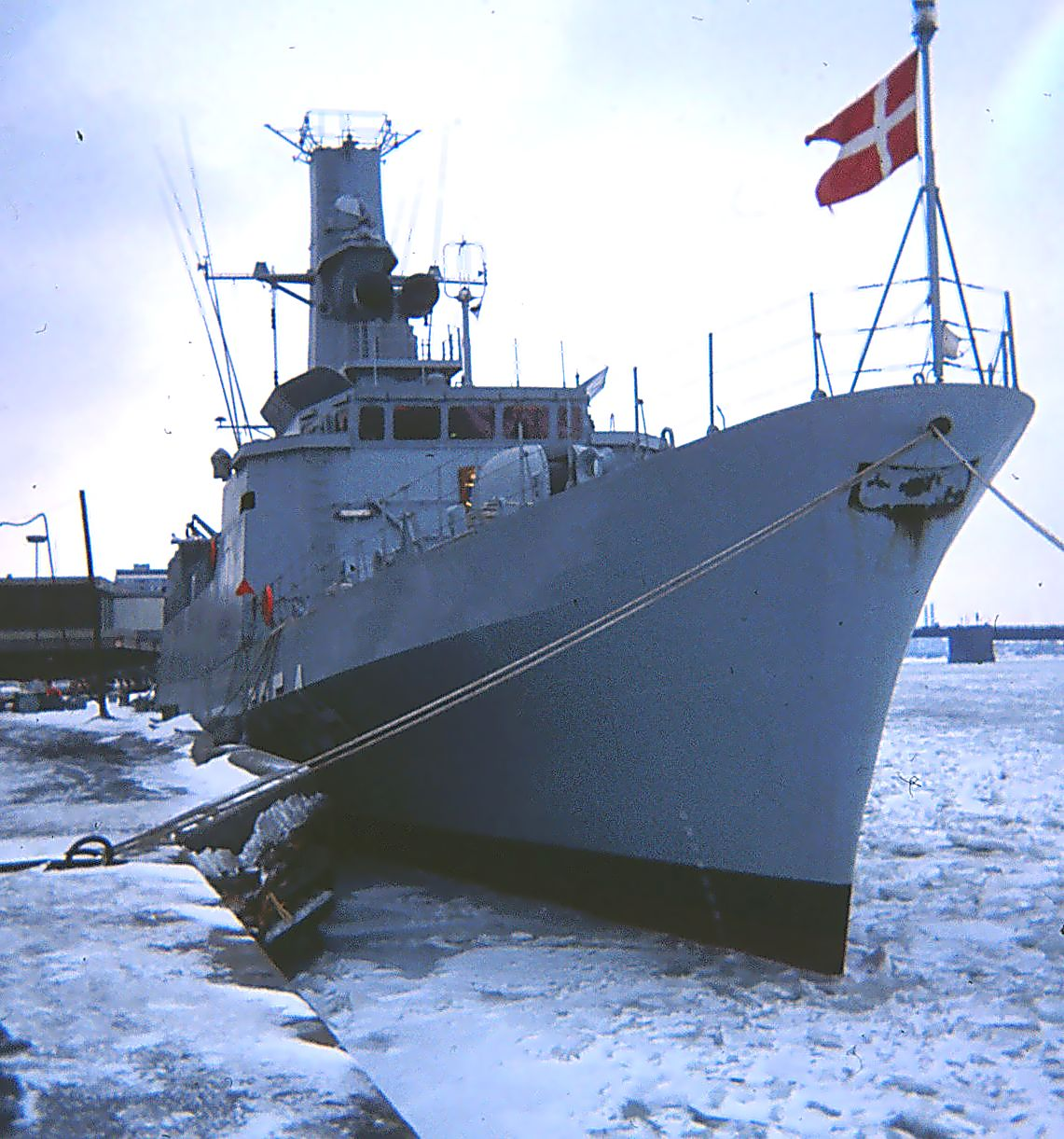
HDMS Niels Juel at Limfjorden in January 1979.

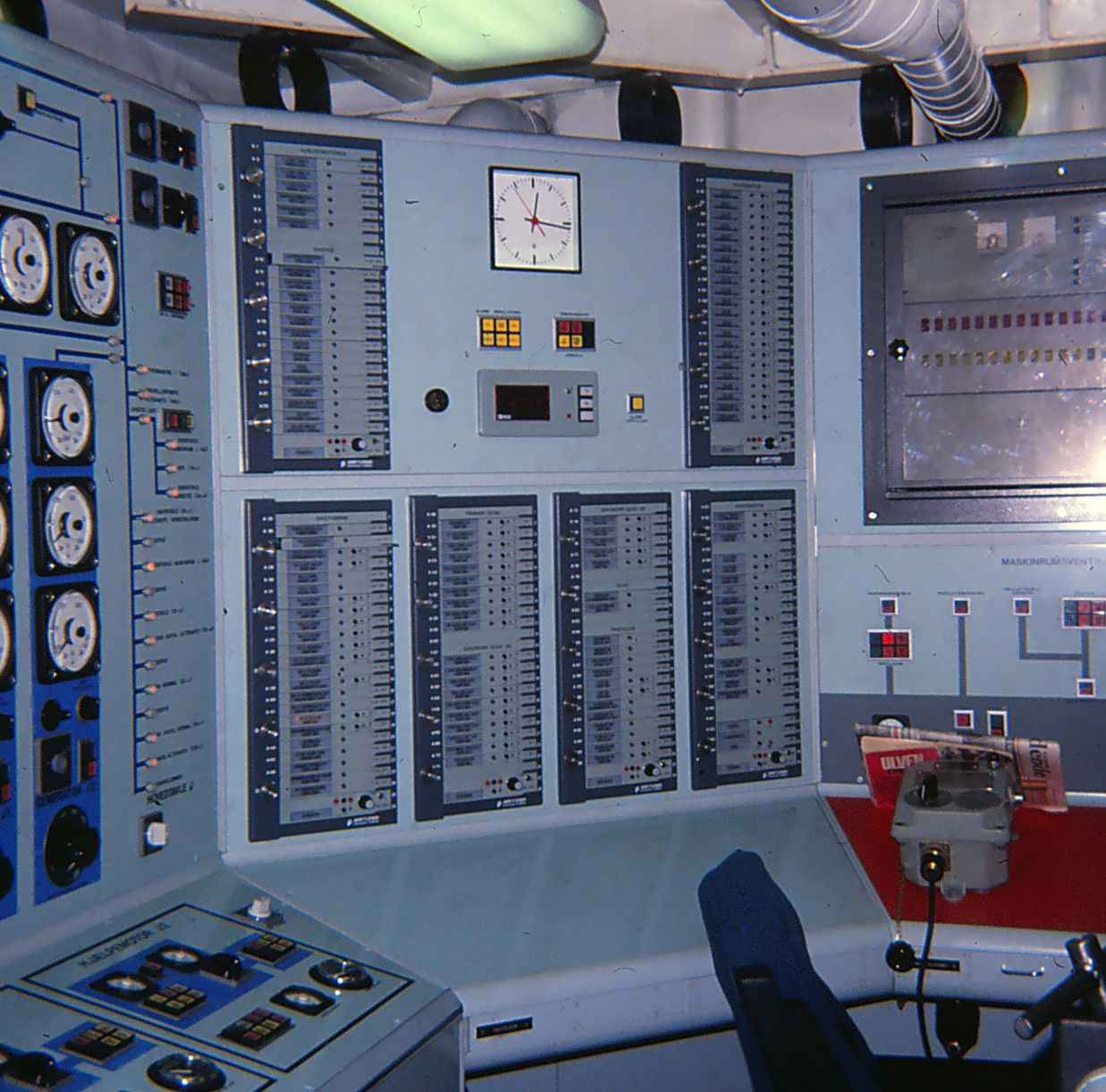
HDMS Niels Juel's engine control room in January 1979.

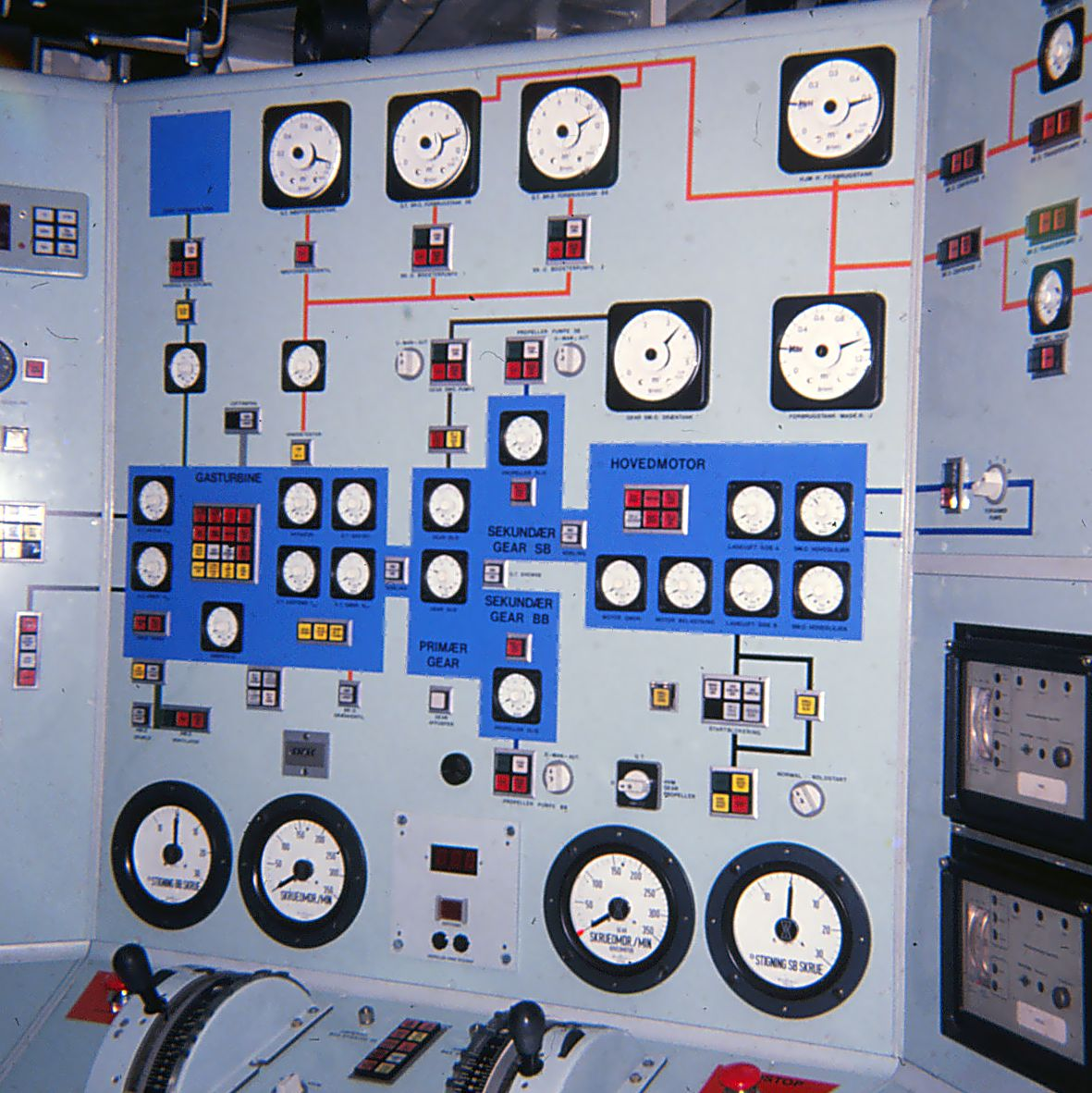
HDMS Niels Juel's engine control room in January 1979.

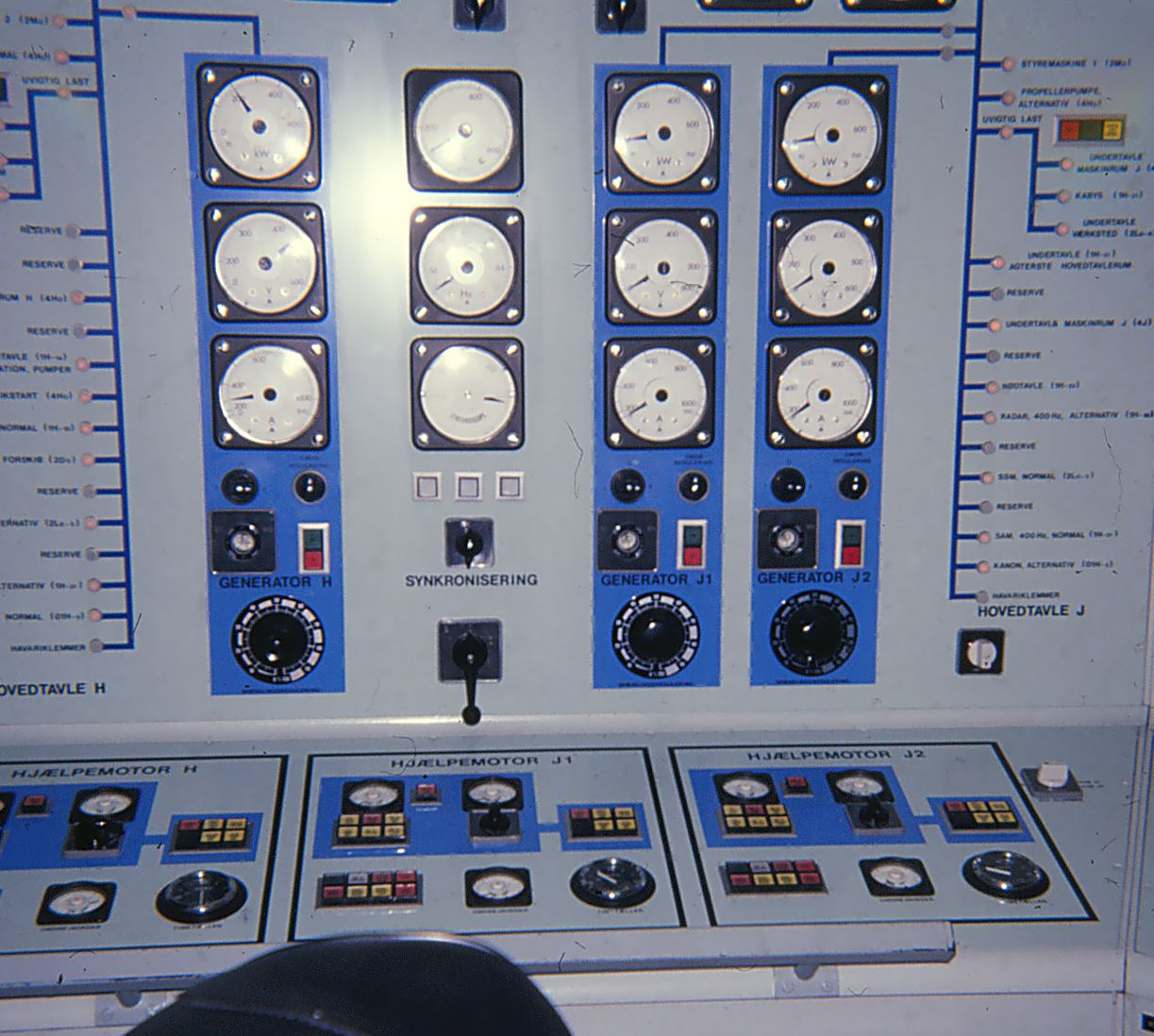
HDMS Niels Juel's engine control room in January 1979.

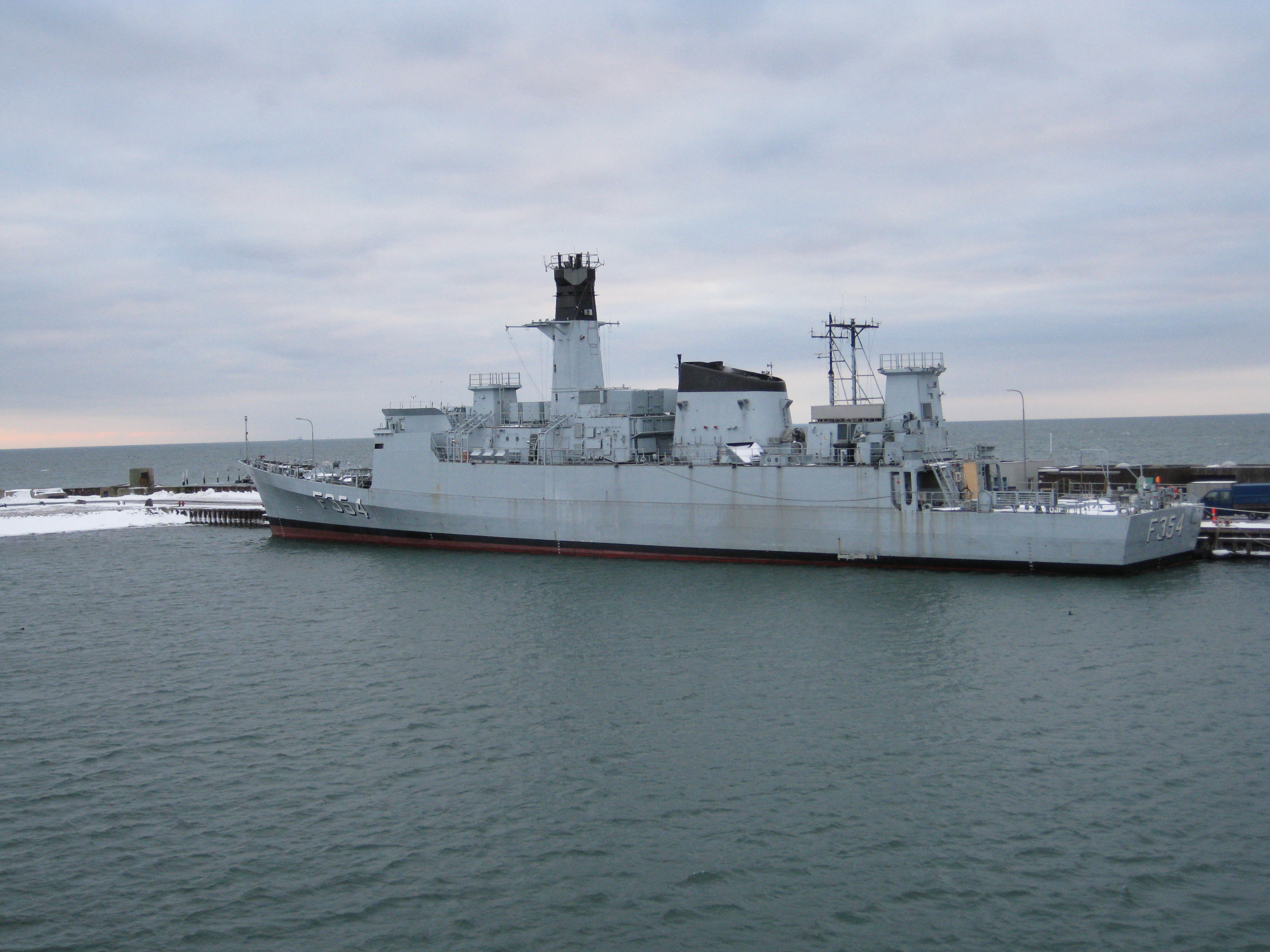
HDMS Niels Juel at Limfjorden awaiting scrap on 3 February 2010.

== See also ==
- HDMS Olfert Fischer (F355)
- HDMS Peter Tordenskiold (F356)
