= Niels Juel-class corvette =

1980 class of Royal Danish Navy corvettes

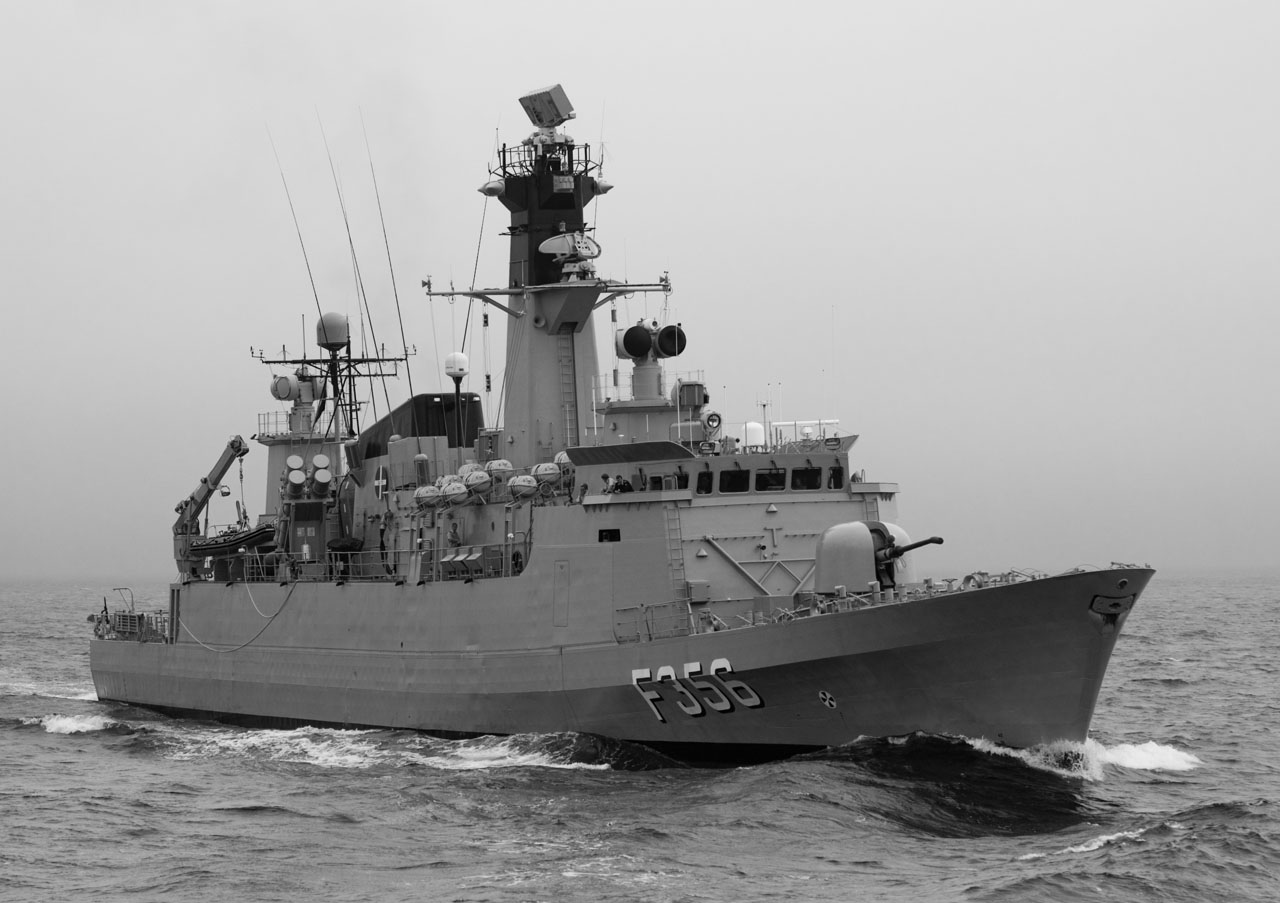
- F356 Peter Tordenskiold

Class overview
- Name: Niels Juel class
- Builders: Aalborg Shipyard
- Operators: Royal Danish Navy
- Preceded by: Peder Skram-class frigate; Triton-class corvette
- Succeeded by: Iver Huitfeldt-class frigate
- Built: 1978–1980
- In commission: 1980–2009
- Planned: 3
- Completed: 3
- Scrapped: 3

General characteristics
- Type: Corvette
- Displacement: 1,450 tonnes
- Length: 84 m (276 ft)
- Beam: 10.3 m (34 ft)
- Draft: 4.8 m (16 ft)
- Installed power: 25,700 shp (19,200 kW) gas turbine; 4,800 bhp (3,600 kW) on diesel engine
- Propulsion: 1 × General Electric gas turbine; 1 × MTU-20V-956 diesel engine
- Speed: 30 knots (56 km/h; 35 mph) (with turbine)
- Range: 4,000 nautical miles (7,400 km; 4,600 mi) at 18 knots (33 km/h; 21 mph); 1,020 nautical miles (1,890 km; 1,170 mi) at 28 knots (52 km/h; 32 mph)
- Endurance: 25 days
- Complement: 93 standard; 110 during operations
- Armament: Harpoon SSM; Sea Sparrow SAM MK-48 Mod. 3 VLS; Stinger SAM; Oto Melara 76 mm gun; several heavy machine guns and a number of depth charges

The Niels Juel class was a three-ship class of corvettes formerly in service with the Royal Danish Navy. They were built in Denmark at Aalborg Shipyard and were launched in the period 1978–1980. In 1998–2000 the three vessels had a mid-life update, as well as a large update on the electrical systems.

The three ships were named Niels Juel (NATO abbreviation NIJU), Olfert Fischer (NATO abbreviation OLFI) and Peter Tordenskiold (NATO abbreviation PETO). All three vessels were named after famous Danish admirals, with the debatable exception of Peter Tordenskjold, a Norwegian-born officer who served during the personal union of Norway and Denmark from 1415 to 1814.

These ships were replaced by the Iver Huitfeldt-class frigates. All three ships were retired in 2009 and were scrapped in 2013 at Munkebo, Denmark.

== Design ==
During the mid-life refit, the corvettes were modified to be able to use the StanFlex modular mission payload system; two module slots were installed aft of the superstructure.

== Duties ==
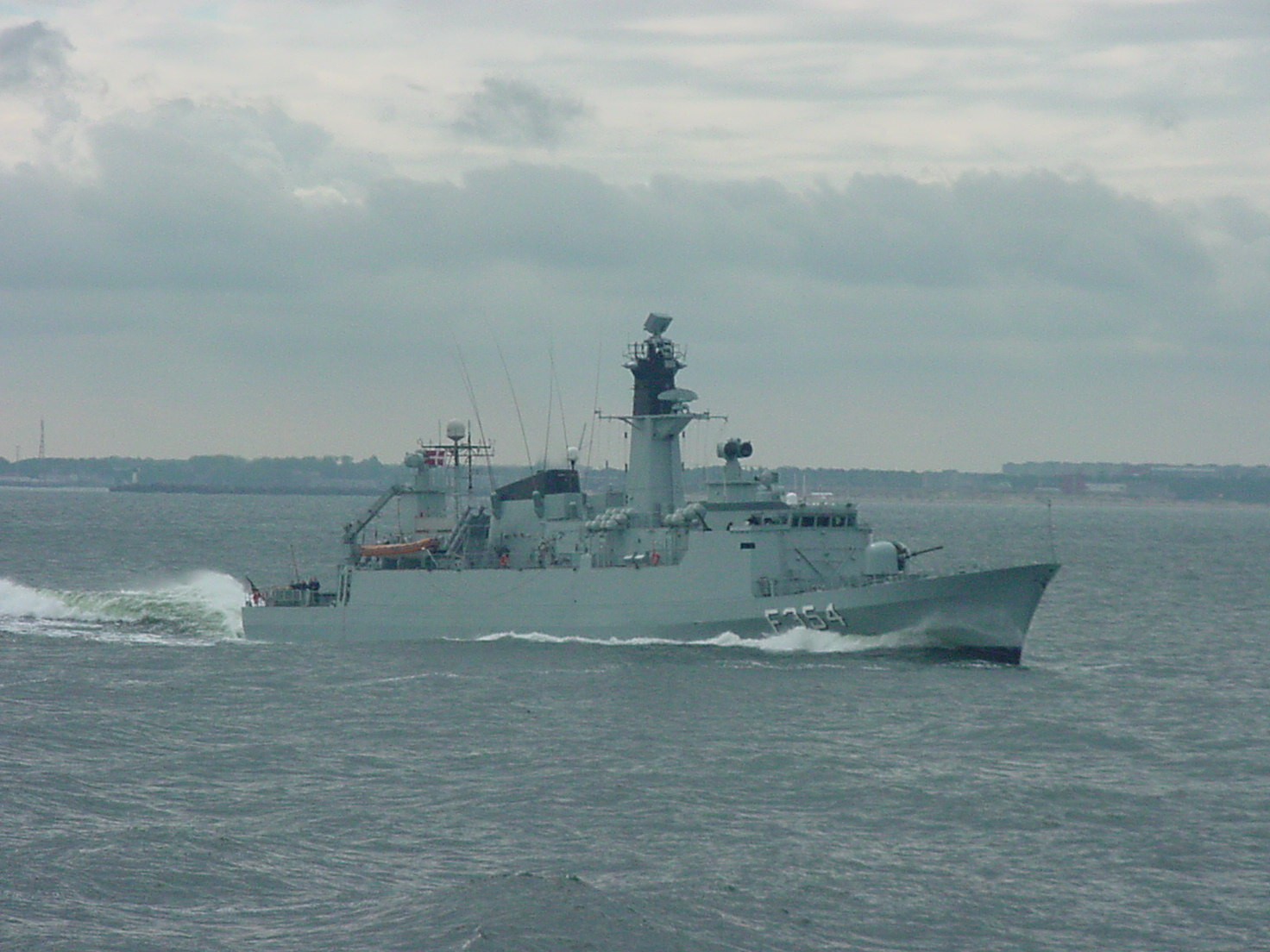
Niels Juel in the Baltic Sea, June 2005

The corvettes played an active role in solving a wide spectrum of duties, including escort and protection of other vessels. They were built to the requirements of the Cold War era, notably the need for guarding and convoy duty in the strategically important Danish Belts. Like many assets built during this period, adapting it to changing needs in the post–Cold War period was challenging, but the Niels Juel class benefited from being built from the outset as austere, economical vessels with a large number of possible roles to play. Also among the various tasks for the corvettes were coast guard duties in Danish national waters, as well as intelligence gathering.

It was normal routine for the Danish corvettes to participate in international operations. On several occasions, the vessels took part in operations for NATO, UN, OSCE and coalition forces.

== List of ships ==
Name	Number	Laid Down	Launched	Commissioned	Decommissioned	Status
Niels Juel	F354	20 October 1977	17 February 1978	26 August 1980	18 August 2009	Scrapped in 2013
Olfert Fischer	F355	6 December 1978	12 January 1980	16 October 1981	18 August 2009	Scrapped in 2013
Peter Tordenskiold	F356	3 December 1979	30 April 1980	2 April 1982	18 August 2009	Scrapped in 2013
