= Danish Task Group =

- Søværnets Taktiske Stab
- The logo (but not escutcheon) of Danish Task Group
- Founded: 01 January 2001 – present (24 years, 7 months)
- Country: Denmark
- Branch: Royal Danish Navy
- Size: Approx. 20
- Engagements: Combined Task Force 150 (2008); Combined Task Force 151 (2012)

Commanders
- Commander Danish Task Group: Cdre Aage Buur Jensen

Danish Task Group (abbrev. DATG, Danish: Søværnets Taktiske Stab), is a Danish naval unit, tasked with commanding, educating and training maritime forces in peace, crisis and war. It is a mobile unit that is experienced in orchestrating exercises, organising insertions (search and rescue, non-combatant evacuation operations, disaster relief operations, etc.) and commanding naval, aerial and land-based units. Danish Task Group was created to expand Denmark's level of competency and quality of material, by participating in international maritime operations. As such Danish Task Group has been commanding combined maritime forces in both exercises (such as BALTOPS and Joint Warrior) and operations (Combined Task Force 150 (2008) and -151 (2012)) a number of times.

Commander Danish Task Group is a captain, who is promoted to Commodore (rank) as long as the position is held, and the Danish Task Group is, depending on tasks, staffed with 20 persons from all branches and during exercises expanded and operations augmented with personnel from the Danish Defence, Danish Ministry of Foreign Affairs, foreign military organisations, etc.
