= Royal Danish Navy =

Sea-based branch of the Danish Defence

- Søværnet
- Founded: 10 August 1510; 516 years ago
- Country: Kingdom of Denmark
- Allegiance: Denmark
- Type: Navy
- Role: Naval warfare
- Size: 3,400 personnel + 200 conscripts 16 ships, 28 vessels and 30 boats
- Part of: Danish Armed Forces
- Engagements: Swedish War of Liberation (1510–23); Count's Feud (1534–36); Nordic Seven Years' War (1563–70); Kalmar War (1611–13); Torstenson War (1643–45); Northern War of 1655–1660 (1657–60); Scanian War (1675–79); Great Nordic War (1700 & 1709–20); Danish-Algerian War (1769–70); Action of 16 May 1797; Battle of Copenhagen (1801); Battle of Copenhagen (1807); Gunboat War (1807–14); First Schleswig War (1848–51); Second Schleswig War (1864); Operation Safari (1943); Whiskey War (1973-2022); Operation Desert Shield (1990–91); Operation Sharp Guard (1993–96); Operation Iraqi Freedom (2003); Combined Task Force 150 (2008–); Combined Task Force 151 (2009–); Operation Prosperity Guardian (2023–)
- Website: Official Website; Official Facebook

Commanders
- Chief of Navy Command: Rear Admiral Søren Kjeldsen
- Notable commanders: Søren Norby, Peter Tordenskjold, Ivar Huitfeldt, Niels Juel, Herluf Trolle, Olfert Fischer, A. H. Vedel

Insignia
- Naval Ensign and jack

The Royal Danish Navy (RDN; Danish: Søværnet, lit. 'The Navy') is the sea-based branch of the armed forces of Denmark. The RDN is mainly responsible for maritime defence and maintaining the sovereignty of Danish territorial waters, which include those of Faroe Islands and Greenland. Other tasks include surveillance, search and rescue, icebreaking, oil spill recovery and prevention as well as contributions to international tasks and forces.

During the period 1509–1814, when Denmark was in a union with Norway, the Danish Navy was part of the Dano-Norwegian Navy. Until the copenhagenization of the navy in 1801, and again in 1807, the navy was a major strategic influence in the European geographical area, but since then its size and influence has drastically declined with a change in government policy. Despite this, the navy is now equipped with a number of large state-of-the-art vessels commissioned since the end of the Cold War. This can be explained by its strategic location as the NATO member controlling access to the Baltic.

Danish Navy ships carry the ship prefix KDM (Kongelige Danske Marine) in Danish, but this is translated to HDMS (Her / His Danish Majesty's Ship) in English. Denmark is one of the many NATO member states whose navies do not deploy submarines. However, historically Denmark has operated them, the submarines were retired in 2004 as part of cooperative defence agreement and restructuring. The Royal Danish Navy has operated a wide variety of vessels over the years, including different types of submarines, patrol boats, minesweepers, missile boats, and frigates. It has also operated a variety of aircraft, and the use of helicopters for search and rescue missions and transport, for example, has been a part of its mission.

== History ==
The geographic layout of Denmark proper (not including Greenland and the Faroe Islands) has a coastline to land area ratio of 1:5.9. For comparison, the figure for the Netherlands is 1:92.1 and for the United States, 1:493.2. Denmark therefore naturally has long-standing maritime traditions, dating back to the 9th century when the Vikings had small but well-organised fleets. They were often based in a small number of villages, usually with a common defence agreement; Viking ships, usually of the Knarr type, were light, and therefore easy to transport from village to village over land. With time, the defence pacts gave rise to larger, more offensive fleets which the Vikings used for plundering coastal areas. In the period after the Vikings, and up to the 15th century, the fleet consisted mainly of merchant vessels. Indeed, it is said that king Valdemar Sejr had more than 1,000 ships during the conquest of Estonia in 1219. Together they carried more than 30,000 soldiers with horses and supplies.

Records exist of a unified Danish navy from the late 14th century. Queen Margaret I, who had just founded the Kalmar Union (consisting of Denmark, Norway, Sweden, Iceland, Greenland, Faroe Islands, Shetland, Orkney, parts of Finland and parts of Germany) ordered the building of a navy – mainly to defend the union against the Hanseatic League. Earlier the national fleet had consisted of vessels owned and operated by the nobility, but the country as such did not have a navy. The earlier monarchs therefore had to rely on conscription from the nobility, which was not always easy as the monarchy itself often had enemies within the nobility. Queen Margaret I gave instructions for a navy to be constituted and maintained under the control of the monarchy. The nobility still had to provide crews (which consisted mainly of "volunteered" farmers) for these ships, though the core crew-members (i.e. masters, master-at-arms and master carpenters) could be employed by the monarch. There were also education officers, mainly levied from the nobility.

In the 15th century, especially during the reign of King Hans, Danish trade expanded appreciably, increasing the need for the delivery of merchandise. As shipping was the ideal means of transport at the time, Danish maritime interests had to be further protected. King Hans is credited with establishing a joint Dano-Norwegian fleet in 1509, substantially increasing the number of professional crewmembers. They were mainly petty criminals, who had to choose between working in the king's navy or imprisonment. They received basic training in seamanship and carpentry, enabling them to sail the ships. Responsibility for weaponry and combat was still in the hands of conscripted farmers. For these, the country was divided into a number of counties – known in Danish as skipæn (the term skip being related to the Danish word for ship, skib), which would later serve as the Danish dioceses. It was also during this period that dedicated naval bases and shipyards were founded. They would build, maintain and fit out the king's navy. The first record of a dedicated naval base is Bremerholmd (later Gammelholm) in the year 1500.

=== Founding of the Royal Danish Navy ===
The founding of the Royal Danish Navy is often viewed in Denmark as taking place on 10 August 1510, when King Hans appointed his vassal Henrik Krummedige to become "chief captain and head of all our captains, men and servants whom we now have appointed and ordered to be at sea."

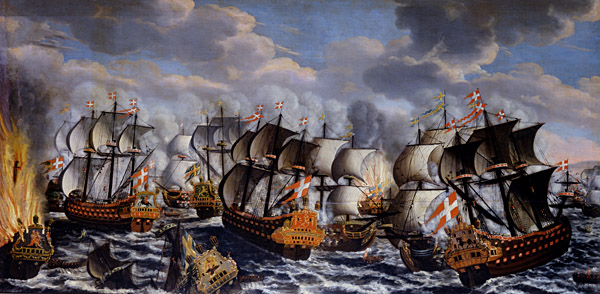
Battle of Køge Bay

When King Frederick II was crowned in 1559, he immediately began expanding the navy. The number of bases, yards and vessels rose rapidly and substantial resources were used for new ship designs, weaponry, training and battle tactics. Sweden, which had become an independent country, dominated a large part of the Baltic Sea and threatened Danish merchant interests. In retaliation, Denmark closed the Øresund in 1568, laying the first seeds for the Scanian War (1675–1679), only eight years after the end of the second Nordic War (1657–1660), during which Denmark lost the now Swedish provinces of Skåne, Halland and Blekinge. During this period, further resources were allocated to the navy. Niels Juel led the Royal Danish Navy to a victory in the Battle of Køge Bay in 1677.

King Christian IV (crowned in 1588) continued in his father's footsteps. In the beginning of the 17th century, he considerably expanded the naval workshops. In Copenhagen, where the navy resided, he built a large number of homes for crewmembers and workshop craftsmen – the most famous being Nyboder (completed in 1631) which still stands in central Copenhagen.

General admiral lieutenant Ulrik Christian Gyldenløve was appointed supreme commander of the navy in 1701. He raised the status of the naval profession and established Søkadetakademie, the predecessor of the Royal Danish Naval Academy. In 1709, Peter Jansen Wessel joined the navy. He was later given the rank of admiral as a reward for his many victories – most famously at Marstrand and Dynekilden. He was later known as Tordenskjold.

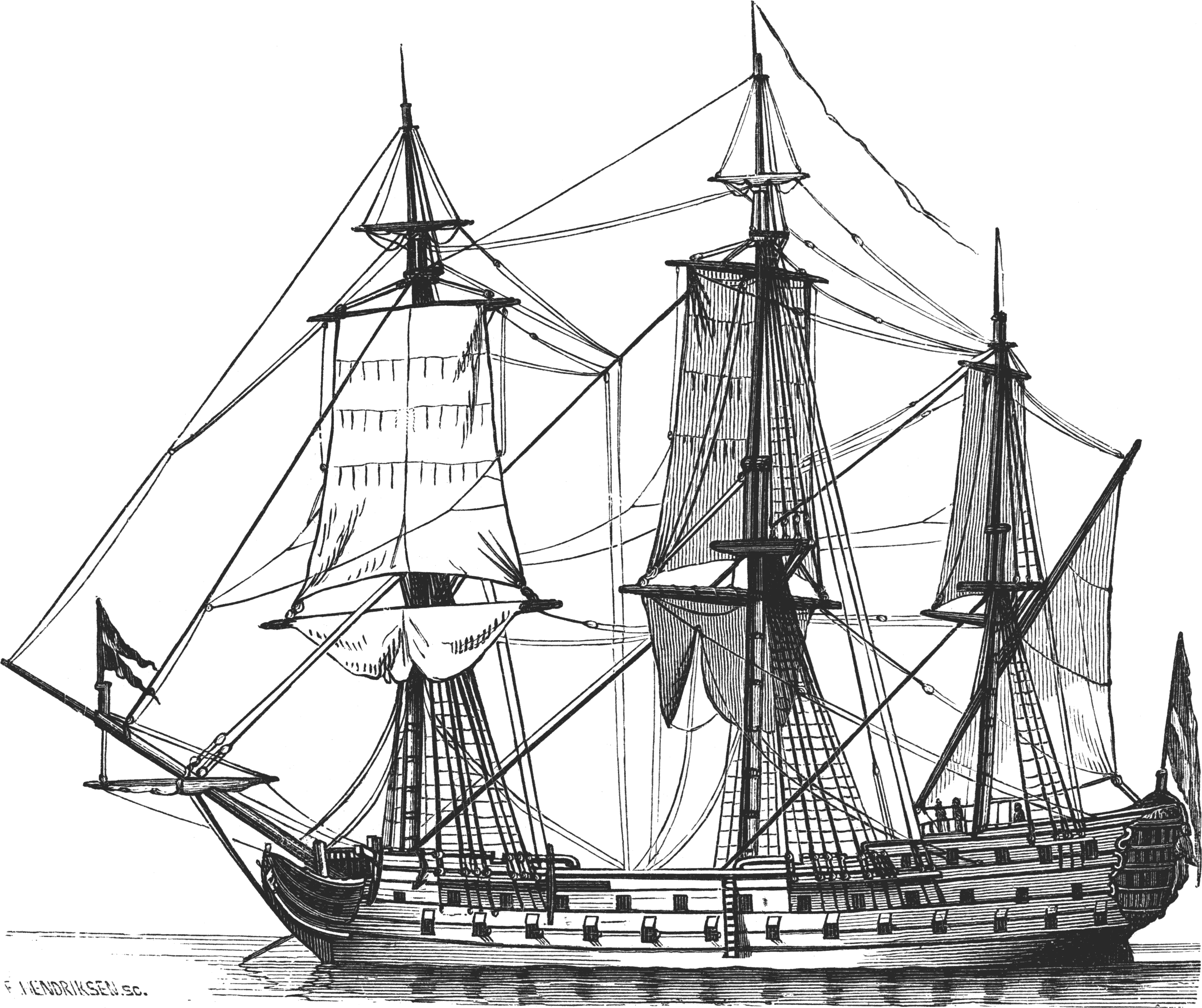
Dronning Juliane Marie c. 1750

In 1712, Tordenskjold succeeded in burning 80 Swedish naval cruisers, which played a large part in the outcome of the Great Nordic War (1709–1720). Since Scandinavia now was at peace, the navy focused its resources on other parts of the world, partaking in the colonisation of Africa and the Caribbean. A permanent naval presence of shifting strength was maintained in the Mediterranean Sea – protecting Danish-Norwegian interests in the region – mainly commerces against piracy. The Danish Mediterranean Squadron had numerous minor engagements with The Barbary States during the 1700s and 1800s. On several occasions these hostilities escalated to substantial actions. Some of the more notable can be said to be: the Mediterranean Squadron's bombardment of Algiers in 1770 under the command of rear admiral Frederik Christian Kaas; the then captain, and future Privy Councillor, Steen Andersen Bille's action at Tripoli in 1797; and commander Hans Georg Garde in a joint Scandinavian expedition in 1844 – which effectively ended the Barbary states' attacks on Scandinavian merchants in the region. A pact of neutrality was made between Denmark (including Norway) and Sweden, providing a solid basis for commercial expansion.

=== Copenhagenization and rebuilding ===
The British, under pressure from the French in the Napoleonic Wars, became increasingly reluctant to allow Denmark to trade overseas as they believed First French Consul & General Bonaparte could benefit economically from Danish commerce. In 1801, they decided send a fleet to attack a Danish fleet, in the Battle of Copenhagen, under the command of Admiral Hyde Parker. The defence line, under the command of Olfert Fischer, put up a fierce fight, but was defeated, with the loss of 3 ships sunk and 12 captured. After the battle, the Crown Prince agreed to sign a truce with the British. In the following six years, Denmark managed to stay clear of the Napoleonic Wars, until the events leading to a second confrontation in 1807. Britain was afraid that the Danish fleet might fall under the control of Napoleon, perhaps tipping the balance in his favour. King Christian VII refused to hand over his navy to the British for safekeeping until the end of the war, and the British decided to capture the fleet by force. Copenhagen was bombarded and the king forced to surrender the fleet.

In 1814, Denmark and Norway were separated relatively peacefully, after more than 300 years together. At the same time, the Common Fleet was split into the Royal Danish Navy and the Royal Norwegian Navy.

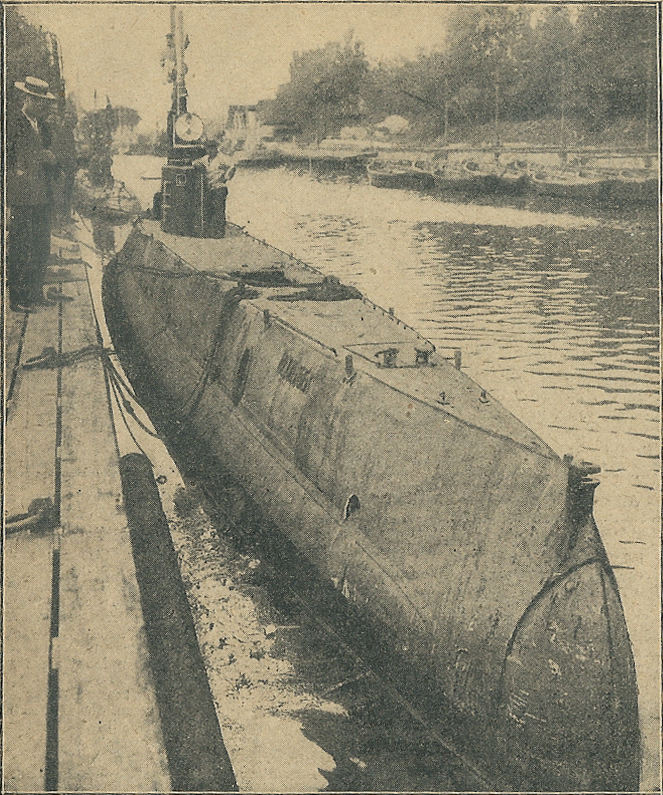
Danish submarine Havmanden during World War I

The navy was slowly rebuilt, but it was nowhere near its former size. Faith was nevertheless placed in the navy, interests in Africa and the Caribbean still receiving considerable attention. In 1845, a two-year research expedition was launched on the corvette Galathea. In the Second Schleswig War (1864), the navy was still relatively small and old-fashioned, even though the Prussian Navy was even smaller. Only a few steam vessels were at hand and these had a large impact on the war, in the end Prussians were not very successful at sea. As a result, it was considered necessary for the navy to be modernised. By the outbreak of World War I (1914), the Danish navy was a very modern fleet, mainly equipped with armoured steam ships and only a very few sailing ships.

=== Interwar period and World War II ===
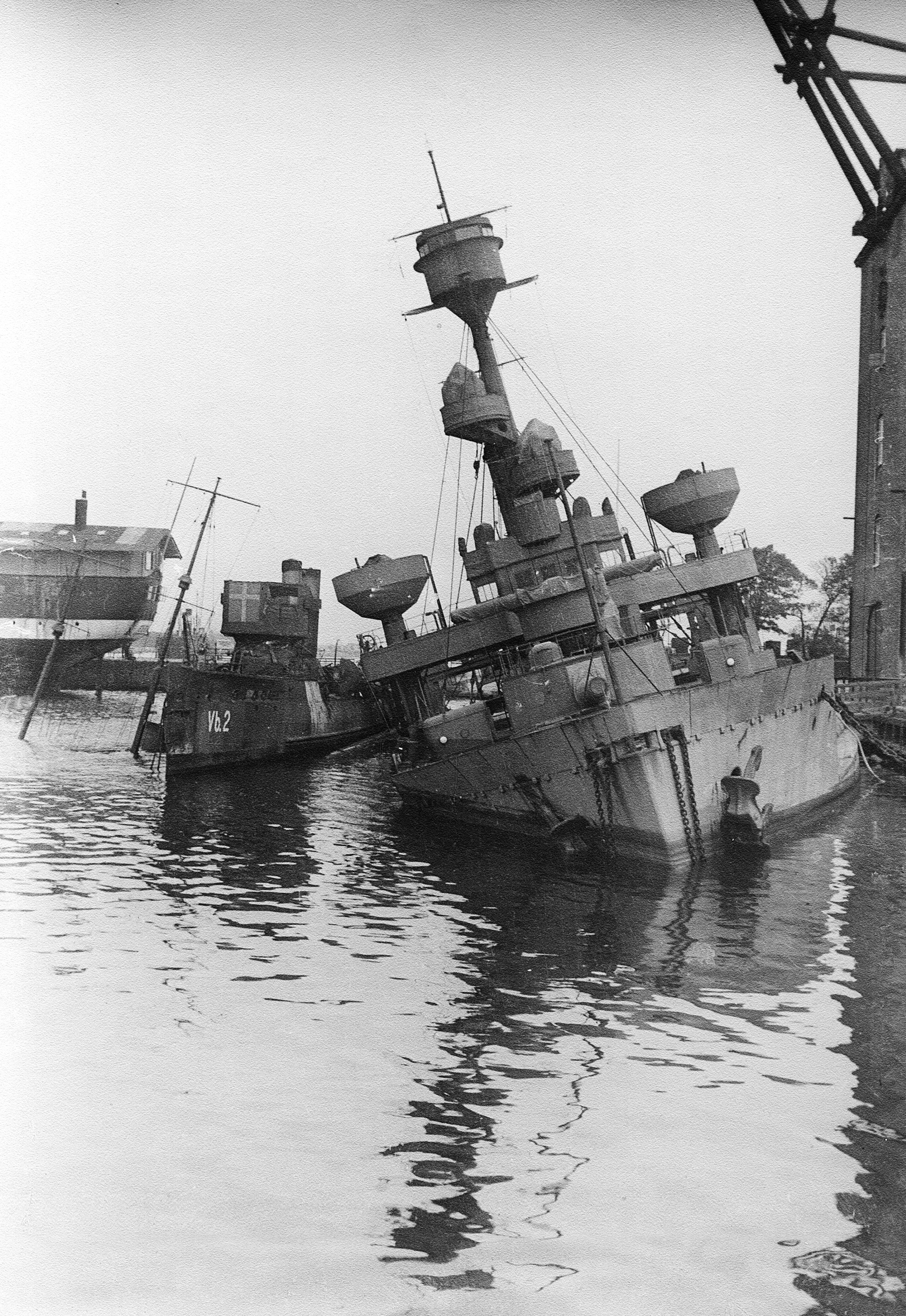
Coastal defence ship Peder Skram scuttled by the Danish Navy on 29 August 1943

In the period between the two World Wars, the Royal Danish Navy (as well as the rest of the Danish military forces) had low priority for the politicians, especially between 1929 and 1942 under Thorvald Stauning. During the first year of the German occupation (1940–1945), the navy assisted the occupying German forces with minesweeping, because of the political demand of keeping the infrastructure (ferry-lines) up and running. The tensions between the German soldiers and the Danish armed forces rose slowly and, on 29 August 1943, they managed to scuttle 32 of its larger ships, while Germany succeeded in seizing 14 of the larger and 50 of the smaller vessels. This was due to a secret order, given directly to the captains by word of mouth by commander of the navy, Vice Admiral A. H. Vedel "to try to flee to the nearest neutral or Nazi-opposed port. If that was not possible, the ship should be scuttled at as deep a location as possible." The Germans later succeeded in raising and refitting 15 of the sunken ships. A number of vessels had been ordered to attempt to escape to Swedish waters, and 13 succeeded. The fleet flagship, Niels Juel, attempted to break out in the Battle of Isefjord but the crew was forced to beach and partly scuttle her. The score for the larger vessels was therefore: 32 vessels were sunk, 2 were in Greenland, 4 reached Sweden, 14 were captured by the Germans. As for the smaller vessels: 9 "patruljekuttere" reached Sweden, 50 others were captured by the Germans. By the autumn of 1944, these ships officially formed a Danish naval flotilla in exile. In September 1943, A. H. Vedel was fired by order of the prime minister Vilhelm Buhl because of his hostile actions towards the Germans.

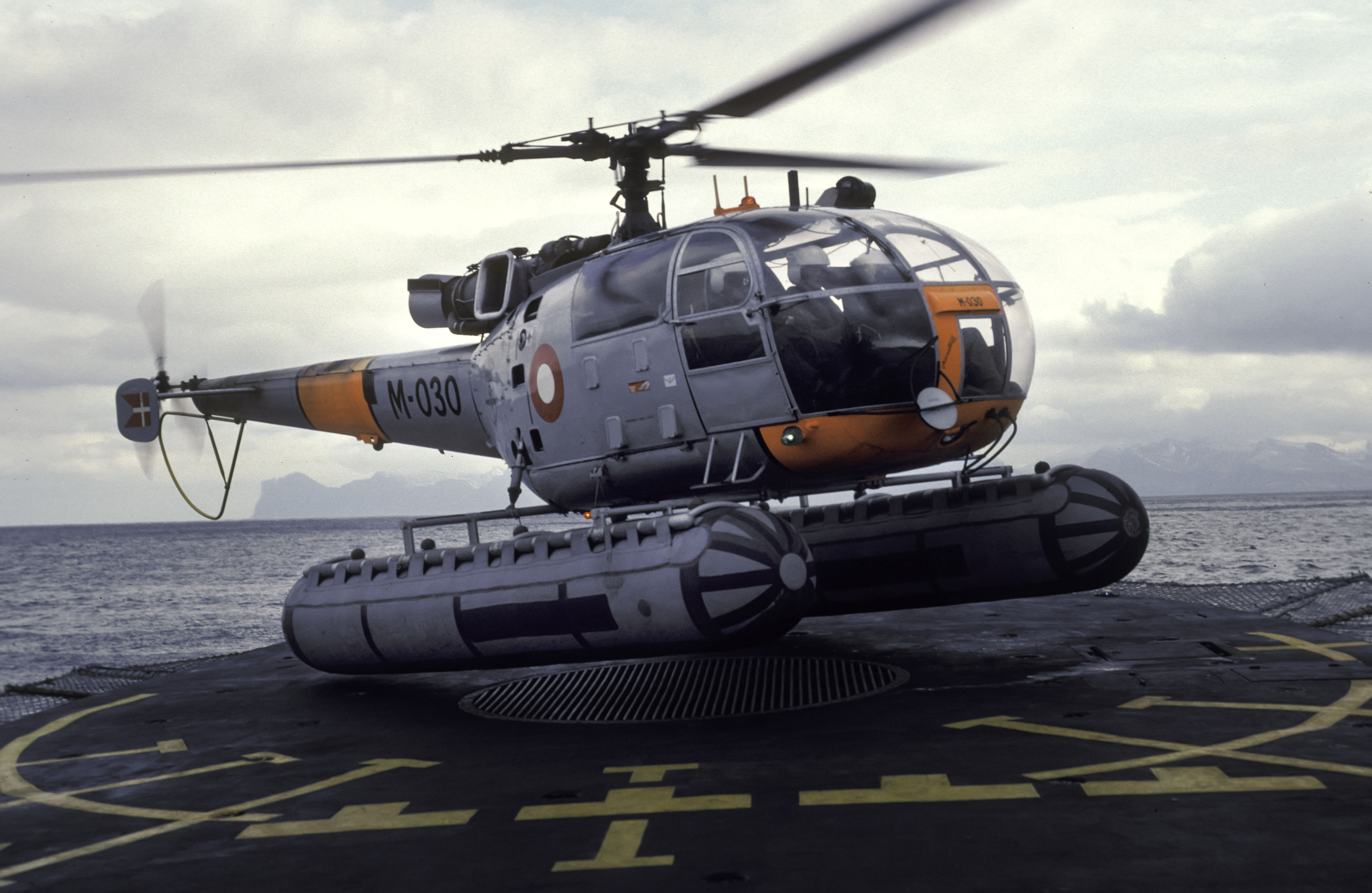
Alouette III helicopters, operated on Arctic patrol vessels (1962–1982)

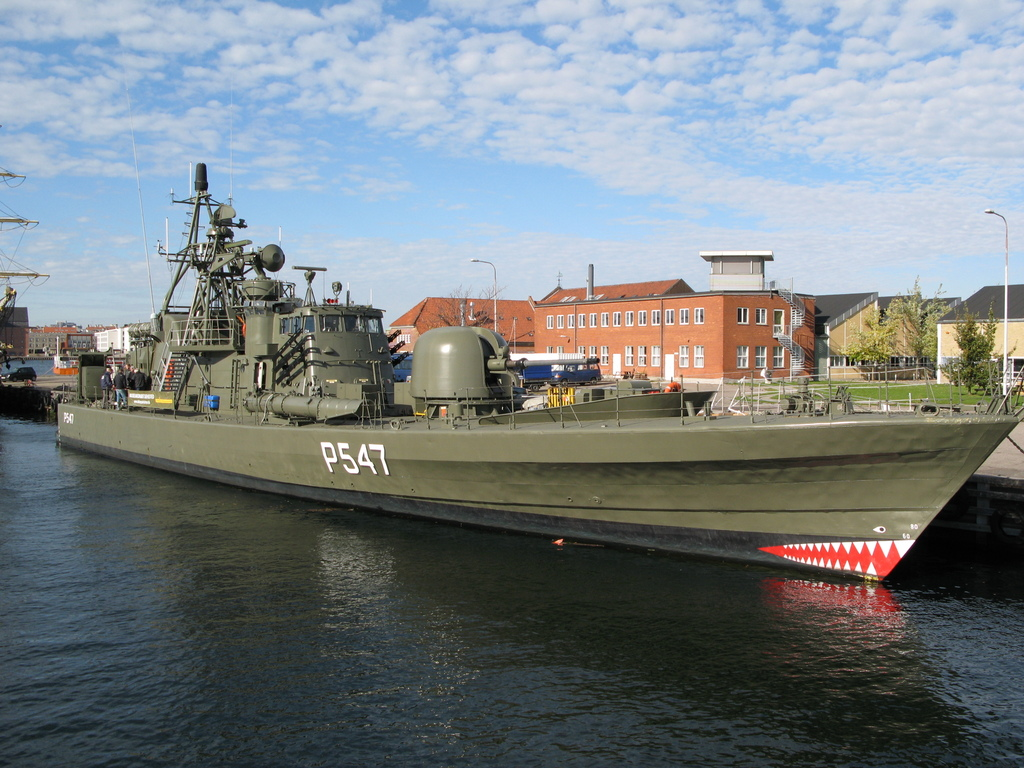
Danish FAC Sehested (Willemoes class)

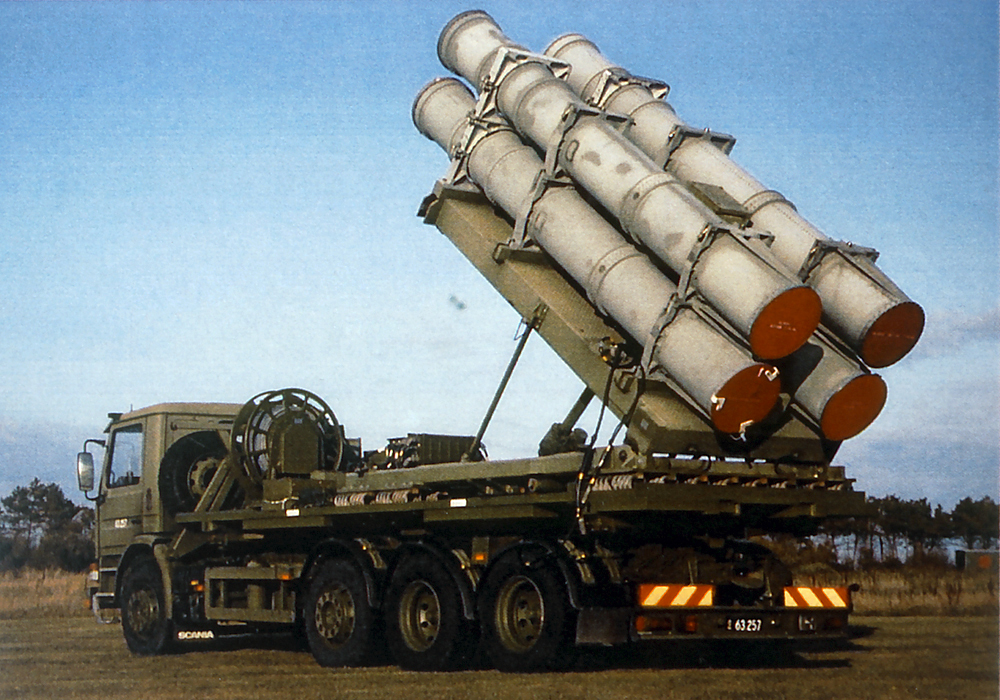
Danish mobile missile battery (MOBA) for coastal defence equipped with Harpoon missiles (1990s–2003)

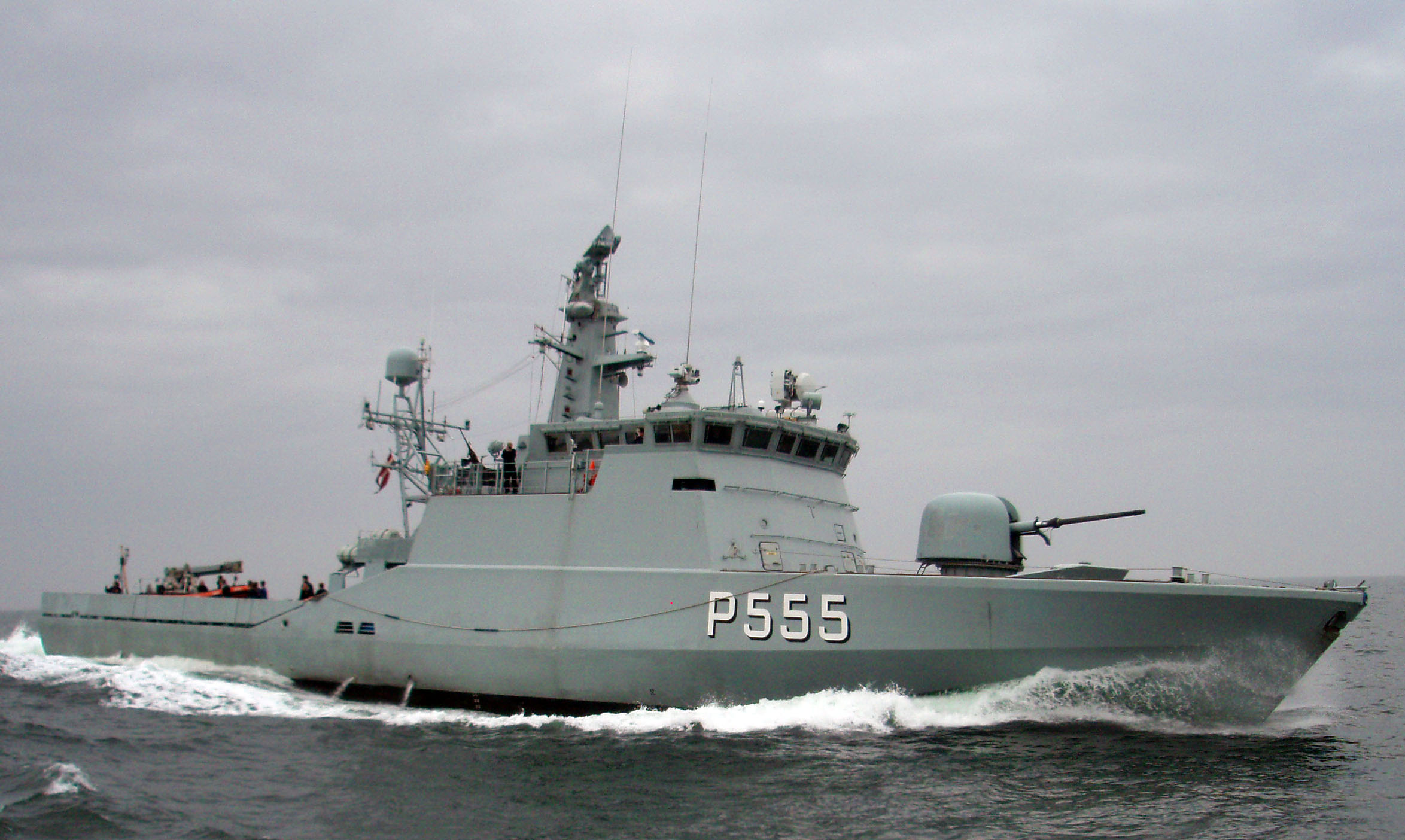
Støren (P555), Flyvefisken class (1989–current)

In the post-war years, Denmark joined NATO in 1949. As a result, Denmark received large amounts of material and financing through the Marshall Plan. Furthermore, several ships were purchased from the British and a number of vessels were transferred from the disarmed Kriegsmarine.

=== Cold War ===
During the Cold War, the Danish navy was rebuilt and modernised, with the main assignment being to repel an invasion from the Warsaw Pact. Typical operations requiring training were minelaying (the now disbanded minelayers of the Falster class (17 knots (31 km/h; 20 mph), 2,000 GRT), were the world's largest minelayers at their time – each had a complement of 280 900 kg mines) and sting attacks with small but fast combat craft (such as the Søløven-class fast torpedo boats (54 kn (100 km/h; 62 mph), 158 GRT) and Willemoes-class missile torpedo boats (45 kn (83 km/h; 52 mph), 260 GRT) and a self-sustaining mobile missile battery (MOBA) equipped with targeting and guidance, capable of firing Harpoon missiles. The Danish intelligence capabilities were also expanded and the Danish submarines trained for very shallow water operations, while a special naval force – the Danish Frogman Corps was created. The naval bases in Frederikshavn and Korsør plus the fortresses at Langeland and Stevns were created through NATO funds in the 1950s. In case of war all Danish combat vessels were assigned to NATO's Allied Forces Baltic Approaches's naval command NAVBALTAP.

=== Post-Cold War ===
Since the end of the Cold War, the navy has been in a transitional phase, from local defence to global operations, with fewer but larger vessels able to operate for long periods at sea. It has also been more self-sustaining. Under the defence agreement (1995–1999) that initiated the process, several of the old "Cold War" frigates and minesweepers were decommissioned. The squadron structure prior to this defence agreement was as follows:

- 1st Squadron = The North Atlantic Squadron (Danish: 'InspektionsSkibsEskadren' (ISE)) with 5 ocean patrol vessels (1 Beskytteren class, 4 Thetis class), 3 ocean patrol cutters (Agdlek class) and 4 icebreakers
- 2nd Squadron = The Frigate Squadron (Danish: 'FreGatEskadren' (FGE)) with 2 frigates (Peder Skram class), 3 corvettes (Niels Juel class), 14 StanFlex-vessels (Flyvefisken class) and 6 seaward defence craft (Daphne class, decommissioned in 1991)
- 3rd Squadron = The Mine Squadron (Danish: 'MineSkibsEskadren' (MSE)) with 4 minelayers (Falster class), 2 cable-minelayers (Lindormen class) and 7 minesweepers (Sund class, decommissioned in 1999)
- 4th Squadron = The Torpedo Boat Squadron (Danish: 'TorpedoBådsEskadren' (TBE)) with 13 torpedo-/missile boats (8 Willemoes class, 5 Søløven class), 2 oilers (Faxe class) and a truck-detachment with missiles and radars called MOBA
- 5th Squadron = The Submarine Squadron (Danish: 'UndervandsBådsEskadren' (UBE)) with 6 submarines (3 Tumleren class, 3 Springeren class) and the Frogmans Corps

In the defence agreement of 2000–2004, further restructuring of the navy was ordered, as well as the decommissioning of several units. Furthermore, the only unit of Beskytteren class was donated to the Estonian Navy as Admiral Pitka. With the decommissioning of the torpedo boats, the 4th squadron was disbanded and the remnants were transferred to the 2nd squadron. Other units were also decommissioned. The squadron structure now looked like this:

- 1st Squadron with 4 ocean patrol vessels (Thetis class), 3 ocean patrol cutters (Agdlek class) and 3 icebreakers
- 2nd Squadron with 3 corvettes (Niels Juel class), 14 StanFlex-vessels (Flyvefisken class), 2 oilers (Faxe class) and a truck-detachment with missiles and radars called MOBA and a new truck-unit MLOG with shops, spare parts, mechanics, etc.
- 3rd Squadron = The Mine Squadron (Danish: 'MineSkibsEskadren' (MSE)) with 4 minelayers (Falster class) and 2 cable-minelayers (Lindormen class)
- 5th Squadron = The Submarine Squadron (Danish: 'UndervandsBådsEskadren' (UBE)) with 4 submarines (3 Tumleren class, 1 Kronbrog class – leased Swedish Näcken class) and the Frogman Corps

On 1 January 2006, a major reorganisation was carried out as a part of the defence agreement of 2005–2009 (which also put an end to the 95-year-old submarine service, with no intention of developing future submarine capability), when the former four squadrons were divided into two squadrons:

- 1st Squadron – domestic affairs squadron
- 2nd Squadron – foreign affairs squadron

On 18 August 2022, the Defence Ministry announced the start of a major naval shipbuilding project, with a commitment of US$5.5 billion in funding to build new warships, in part as a response to the recent Russian invasion of Ukraine. The funding is expected to be committed to programs that will roll out to ship commissioning over a 20 to 25-year period, and is a part of the government of Denmark's recent publicly stated plan to increase defence spending to two percent of the country's gross domestic product (GDP).

== Structure of the Royal Danish Navy ==
=== Structure circa 2018 ===
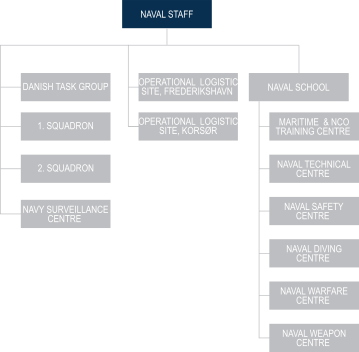
Organization of the Royal Danish Navy, 2018

Major land facilities of the Danish Navy. Arctic Command is beyond the map.

The Naval Staff (in Danish Marinestaben), led by a Rear Admiral, the Admiral Danish Fleet, is directly responsible to the Danish Defence Command. Since 2014, it has been placed at Karup Air Base.

The Danish Task Group is a headquarters tasked with commanding, educating and training maritime forces in peace, crisis and war. It is a mobile unit that is experienced in orchestrating exercises, organising insertions (search and rescue, non-combatant evacuation operations, disaster relief operations, etc.) and commanding naval, aerial and land-based units. Danish Task Group was created to expand Denmark's level of competency and quality of material, by participating in international maritime operations. The Danish Task Group has commanded combined maritime forces in both exercises (such as BALTOPS and Joint Warrior) and operations (Combined Task Force 150 (2008) and Combined Task Force 151 (2012)) a number of times.

Today the fleet is divided into three squadrons:

- 1st Squadron, administratively based at Naval Base Frederikshavn, handles all tasks regarding Arctic Ocean affairs, such as maritime defence and sovereignty of Greenlandic and Faroese territorial waters, surveillance, search and rescue and oil spill recovery and prevention. It has provided units for international tasks, such as the environmental recovery vessel Gunnar Seidenfaden for the cleanup after the Prestige oil spill and the ocean patrol vessel Thetis for the protection force programme of WFP chartered ships at the Horn of Africa.
- 2nd Squadron, administratively based at Naval Base Korsør, is specialized in foreign affairs. It conducts exercises for participation in various international tasks, such as providing protection force, disaster relief operations and non-combatant evacuation operations. It permanently provides units for international standing maritime groups as well as supporting various maritime operations.
- 3rd Squadron, administratively based at Naval Base Frederikshavn, handles all tasks regarding domestic affairs such as maritime defence and sovereignty of Denmark, territorial waters, surveillance, search and rescue, icebreaking and oil spill recovery and prevention.

=== Naval Operational Logistic Sites ===
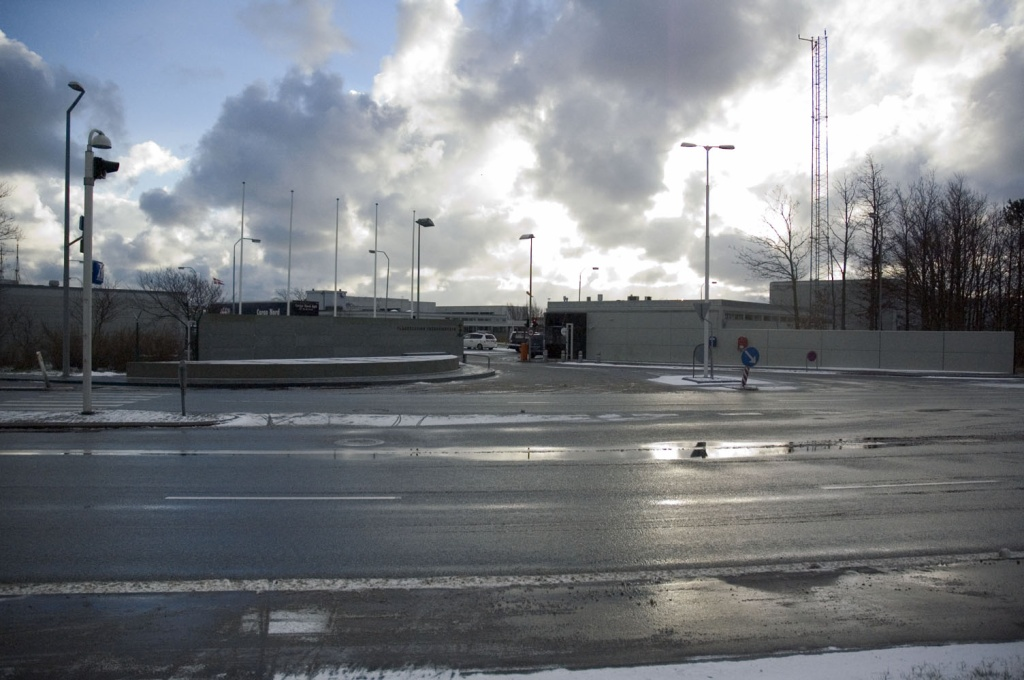
Naval Base Frederikshavn

The Naval Operational Logistic Support Structure (OPLOG), includes the naval bases in Frederikshavn and Korsør as well as several naval stations. The naval bases' task is to provide logistic support for the ships and vessels, through the OPLOGs. This includes configuration, maintaining and repairing the units. Furthermore, similar support is provided to civilian agencies (i.e. the Danish police) and allied units like the United Nations

The support is mainly provided within the geographical areas of the naval bases. For Naval Base Korsør that is Zealand, Funen, Bornholm as well as the surrounding waters. For Naval Base Frederikshavn it is Jutland, Greenland and the Faroe Islands. Moreover, general support is provided for units participating in international operations in peacetime, as well as all units in crisis and wartime.

The navy maintains a number of naval stations. These are smaller stations with limited support functions. The best known is the publicly accessible Naval Station Holmen in Copenhagen. There are also naval stations located in Kongsøre

=== Naval schools ===
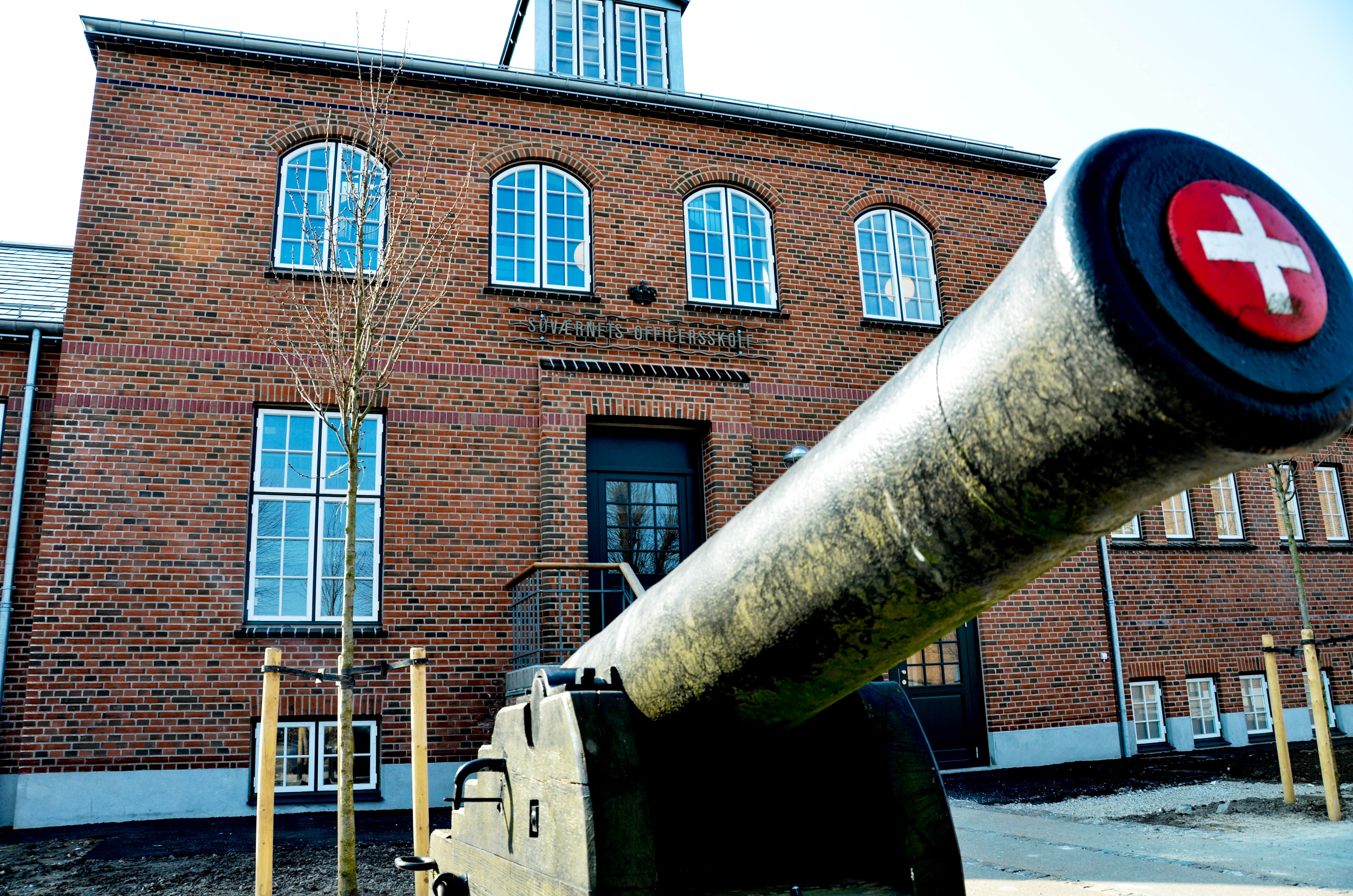
Royal Danish Naval Academy

Runs three main schools, with five special schools:

- Naval NCO and Basic Training School (Danish: Søværnets Sergent – og Grundskole (SSG)) near Frederikshavn
- Danish naval academy (Danish: Søværnets Officersskole) at Holmen, Copenhagen
- Naval specialist schools (Danish: Søværnets specialskoler):
  - Naval Warfare School (Danish: Center For Taktikkursus (TAK)) at Naval Base Frederikshavn and Holmen, Copenhagen
  - Naval Weapons School (Danish: Center For Våben (VBK)) at Sjællands Odde
  - Naval Technical School (Danish: Center For Teknik (CT)) at Holmen, Copenhagen
  - Naval Damage Control School (Danish: Center For Skibssikkerhed (SHK)) near Frederikshavn
  - Naval Diving School (Danish: Center For Dykning (CD)) at Holmen, Copenhagen
  - Naval Centre for Sergeant and Maritime Education (Danish: Center For Sergent og Maritim Uddannelse)

=== Royal Danish Navy in the late 1980s ===
Danish major naval bases and coastal fortresses in 1989

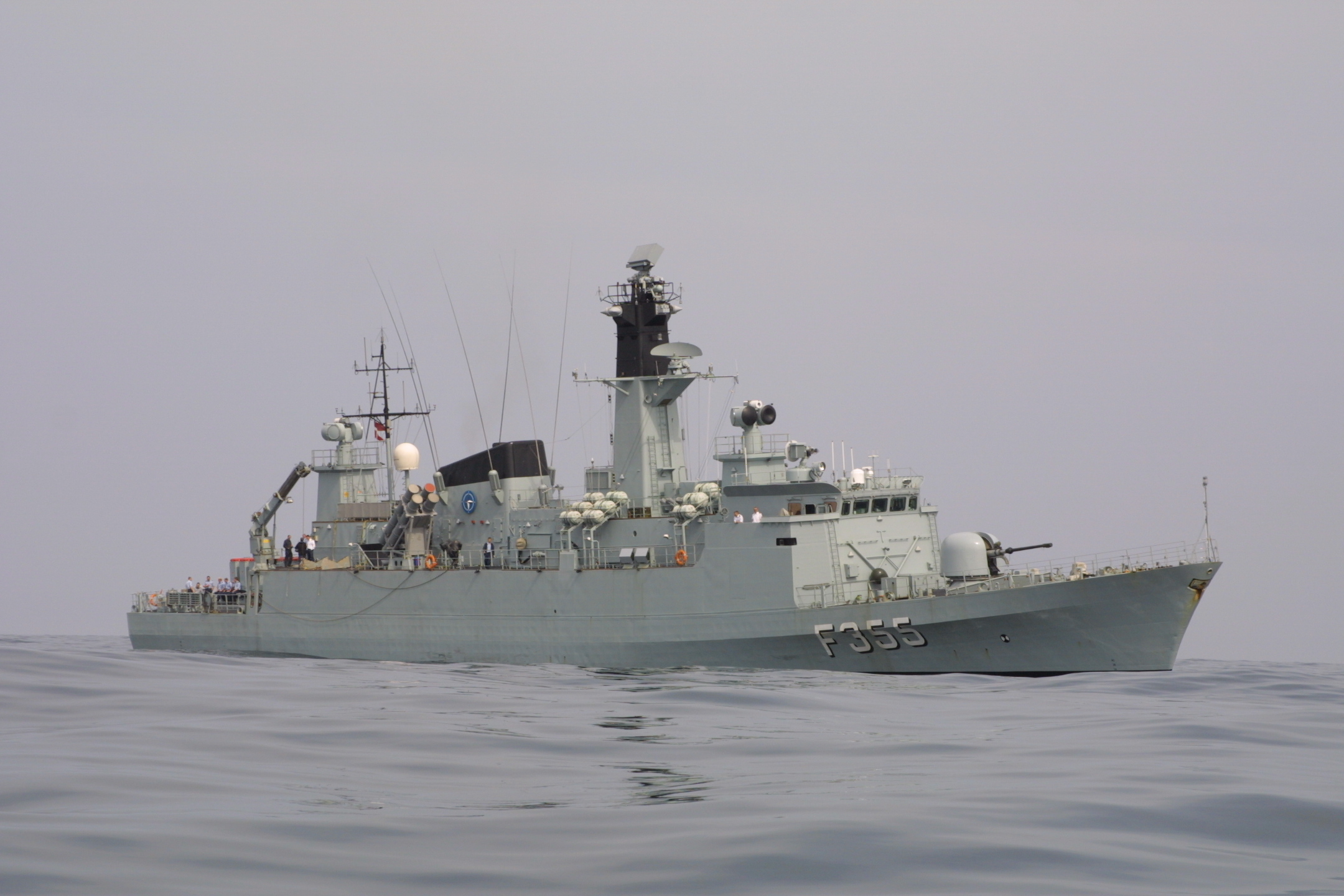
Corvette HDMS Olfert Fischer (F355) underway.

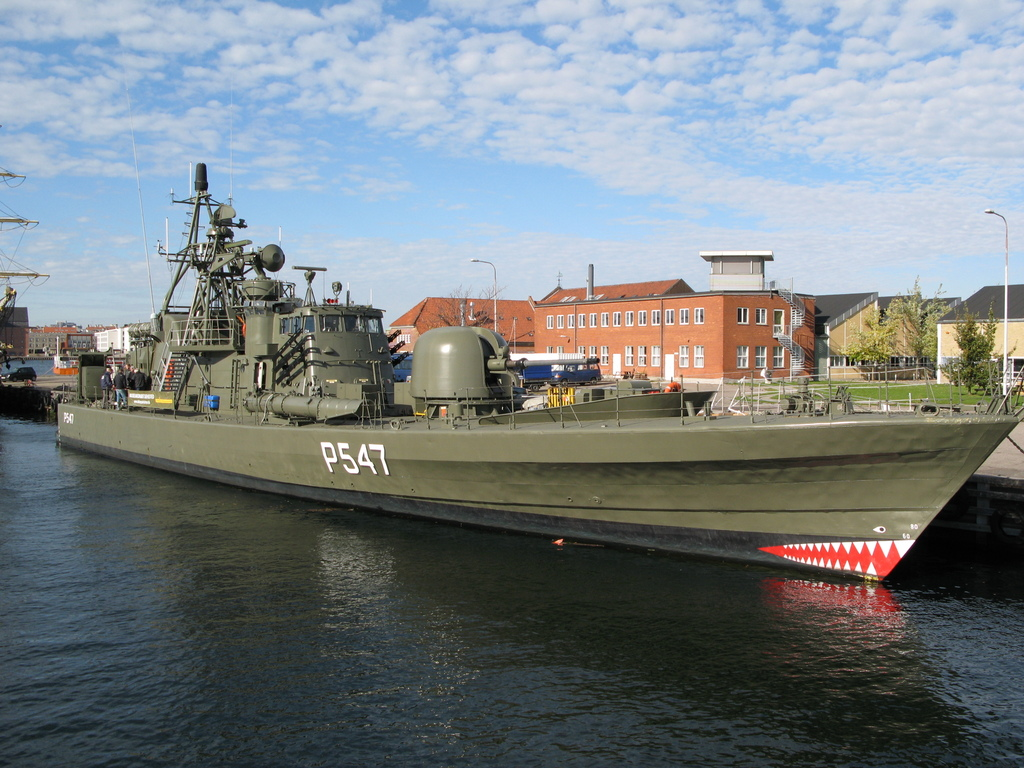
Missile boat HDMS Sehested (P547) in port.

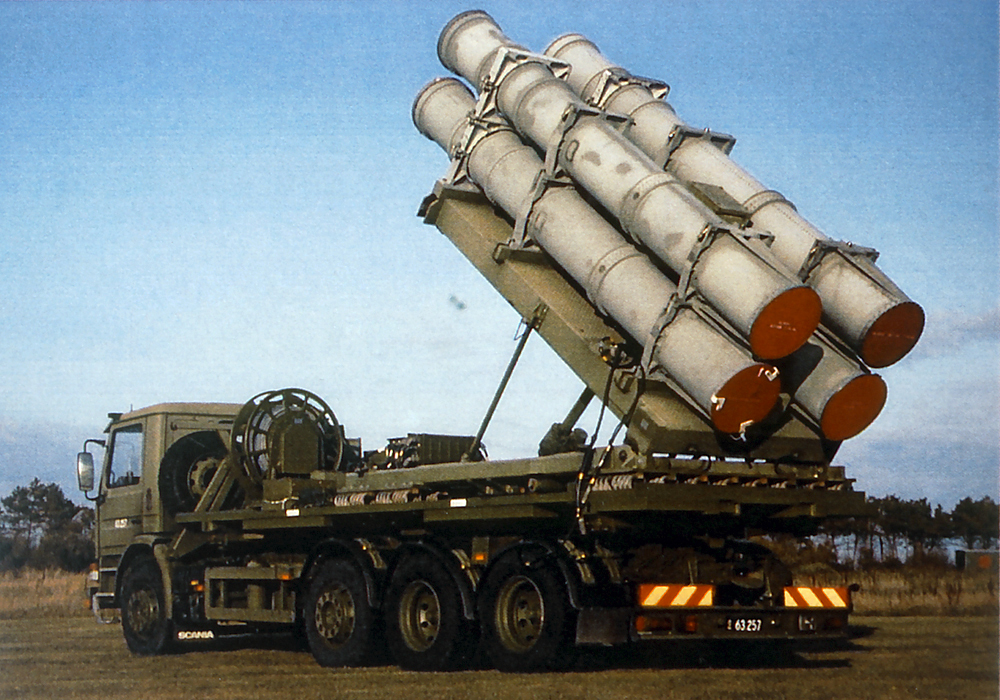
Danish mobile Harpoon anti-ship missile launcher

The navy headquarters was located in Aarhus, tasked to train, maintain and prepare the navy for war. Operational command in peacetime rested with the Navy Operational Command. In war the commander of the Royal Danish Navy would have assumed his appointment as "Flag Officer Denmark (FOD)" under the command of Allied Naval Forces Baltic Approaches (NAVBALTAP), which was commanded alternatingly by a Danish or German vice admiral. However Danish ships and units based in Greenland and the Faroe Islands would have come under command of NATO's Command Eastern Atlantic Area (EASTLANT), who would also have taken command of Island Command Greenland and Island Command Faroes.

Together with the German Fleet under the Flag Officer Germany (FOG), the RDN would have tried to keep the Warsaw Pact's United Baltic Sea Fleets, consisting of the Soviet Baltic Fleet, Polish Navy and East German Volksmarine bottled up in the Baltic Sea by blocking the Danish Straits and thus ensuring NATOs unchallenged control of the North Sea. Additionally NAVBALTAP was to prevent amphibious landings on the Danish coast. To fulfill its mission the navy fielded a large number of minelayers and fast attack crafts. The first would have been used to mine all sealanes and potential landings beaches, while the latter would have harassed the enemy fleet with continuous hit and run attacks.

At the beginning of 1989 the Royal Danish Navy consisted of the following ships:

- Royal Danish Navy, in Aarhus, commanded by a vice admiral
  - Navy Materiel Command, Aarhus
    - Navy Depot Service
    - Navy Maintenance Service
    - Navy Ammunition Arsenal
  - Frogman Corps, at Torpedo Station Kongsøre
  - Sirius Dog Sled Patrol, Daneborg, Greenland
  - Navy Operational Command, Aarhus
    - Kattegat Marine District, Frederikshavn (Maritime Surveillance Center and tactical control of sea units)
    - Bornholm Marine District, Rytterknægten (Maritime Surveillance Center and tactical control of sea units)
      - Frigate Squadron
        - Peder Skram-class frigates: HDMS Peder Skram (F352), HDMS Herluf Trolle (F353)
        - Niels Juel-class corvettes: HDMS Niels Juel (F354), HDMS Olfert Fischer (F355), HDMS Peter Tordenskiold (F356)
        - Daphne-class seaward defence vessels (in the process of being replaced by Flyvefisken-class patrol vessels): Daphne (P530), Dryaden (P531), Havfruen (P533), Najaden (P534), Nymfen (P535), Neptun (P536; decommissioned 30 October 1989), Ran (P537), Rota (P538; decommissioned 31 October 1989)
        - Oiler: Sleipner (A559)
      - Torpedo Boat Squadron
        - Søløven-class fast torpedo boats (in the process of being replaced by Flyvefisken-class patrol vessels): Søløven (P510), Søridderen (P511), Søbjørnen (P512), Søhesten (P513), Søhunden (P514), Søulven (P515)
        - Willemoes-class fast missile boats: Bille (P540), Bredal (P541), Hammer (P542), Huitfeldt (P543), Krieger (P544), Norby (P545), Rodsteen (P546), Sehested (P547), Suenson (P548), Willemoes (P549)
        - Flyvefisken-class patrol vessel: Flyvefisken (P550) (commissioned 19 December 1989)
        - Oilers: Rimfaxe (A568), Skinfaxe (A569)
        - Land-based Mobile Base (MOBA) with approximately 40 trucks, which supplied fuel, ordnance, and freshwater, and provided repair facilities outside the naval bases to the torpedo boats. MOBA also had mobile radars for tactical surveillance and target acquisition, and
      - Submarine Squadron
        - Narwhal-class submarines: Narhvalen (S320), Nordkaperen (S321)
        - Kobben-class submarine: Tumleren (S322; bought from Norway and commissioned on 20 October 1989)
        - Dolphin-class submarines: Spækhuggeren (S327; decommissioned 31 July 1989), Springeren (S329)
      - Mine Vessels Squadron
        - Lindormen-class cable minelayers: Lindormen (N43), Lossen (N44)
        - Falster-class minelayers: Falster (N80), Fyen (N81), Møen (N82), Sjælland (N83)
        - Sund-class minesweepers (in the process of being replaced by Flyvefisken-class patrol vessels): Alssund (M572; decommissioned 30 November 1989), Egernsund (M573; decommissioned 31 December 1989), Grønsund (M574), Guldborgsund (M575), Ulvsund (M577; had been refitted as a minehunter, decommissioned 31 December 1989), Vilsund (M578)
      - Fishery Protection Squadron
        - Hvidbjørnen-class offshore patrol frigates: Hvidbjørnen (F348), Vædderen (F349), Ingolf (F350), Fylla (F351)
        - Beskytteren-class offshore patrol frigate: Beskytteren (F340)
        - Agdlek-class arctic patrol cutters: Agdlek (Y386), Agpa (Y387), Tulugaq (Y388)
        - Barsø-class naval patrol cutters: Barsø (Y300), Drejø (Y301), Romsø (Y302), Samsø (Y303), Thurø (Y304), Vejrø (Y305), Farø (Y306), Læsø (Y307), Rømø (Y308)
      - Danish Naval Air Squadron, Værløse Air Base (8x Lynx Mk.80 helicopters)
      - Coastal artillery, with truck-mounted AGM-84 Harpoon anti-ship missiles

==== Navy Bases ====
Main bases:

- Holmen Naval Base
- Frederikshavn Naval Base
- Korsør Naval Base

Minor naval bases:

- Marine Station Aarhus (Danish Navy fleet command base)
- Marine Station Esbjerg (NATO reinforcements port)
- Marine Station Grønnedal in Greenland
- Marine Station Thorshavn in the Faroe Islands
- Torpedo Station Kongsøre (Frogman Corps and mine divers base)
- Lyngsbæk Pier (Naval mines depot)

Coastal fortifications:

- Stevnsfortet at the southern entrance to Øresund
- Langelandsfortet at the southern entrance to the Great Belt

Sea surveillance stations:

- Marine Station Møn
- Marine Station Gedser
- Marine Station Bornholm

== International operations ==
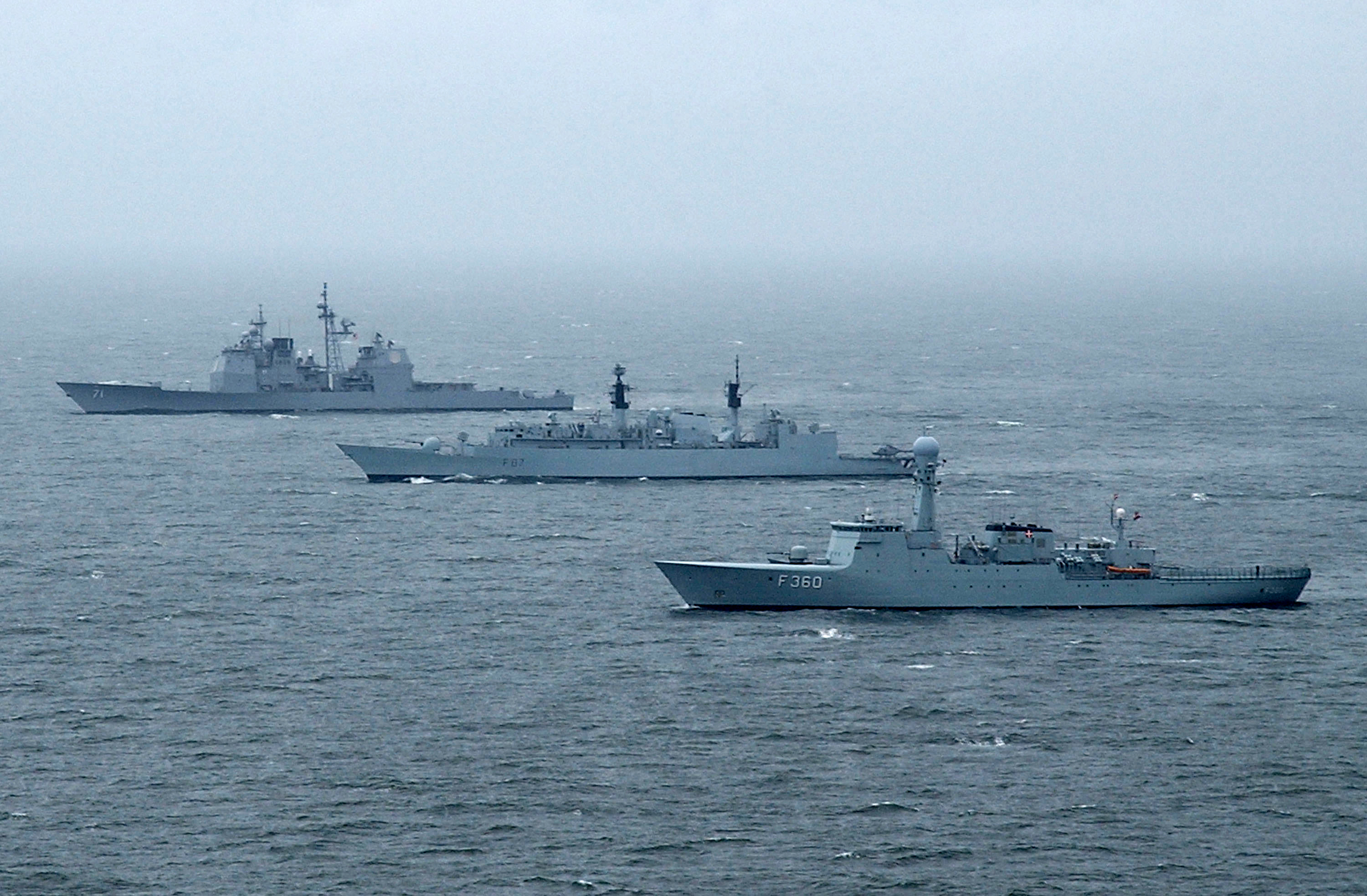
HDMS Hvidbjørnen (front) beside HMS Chatham and USS Cape St. George during international exercise BALTOPS

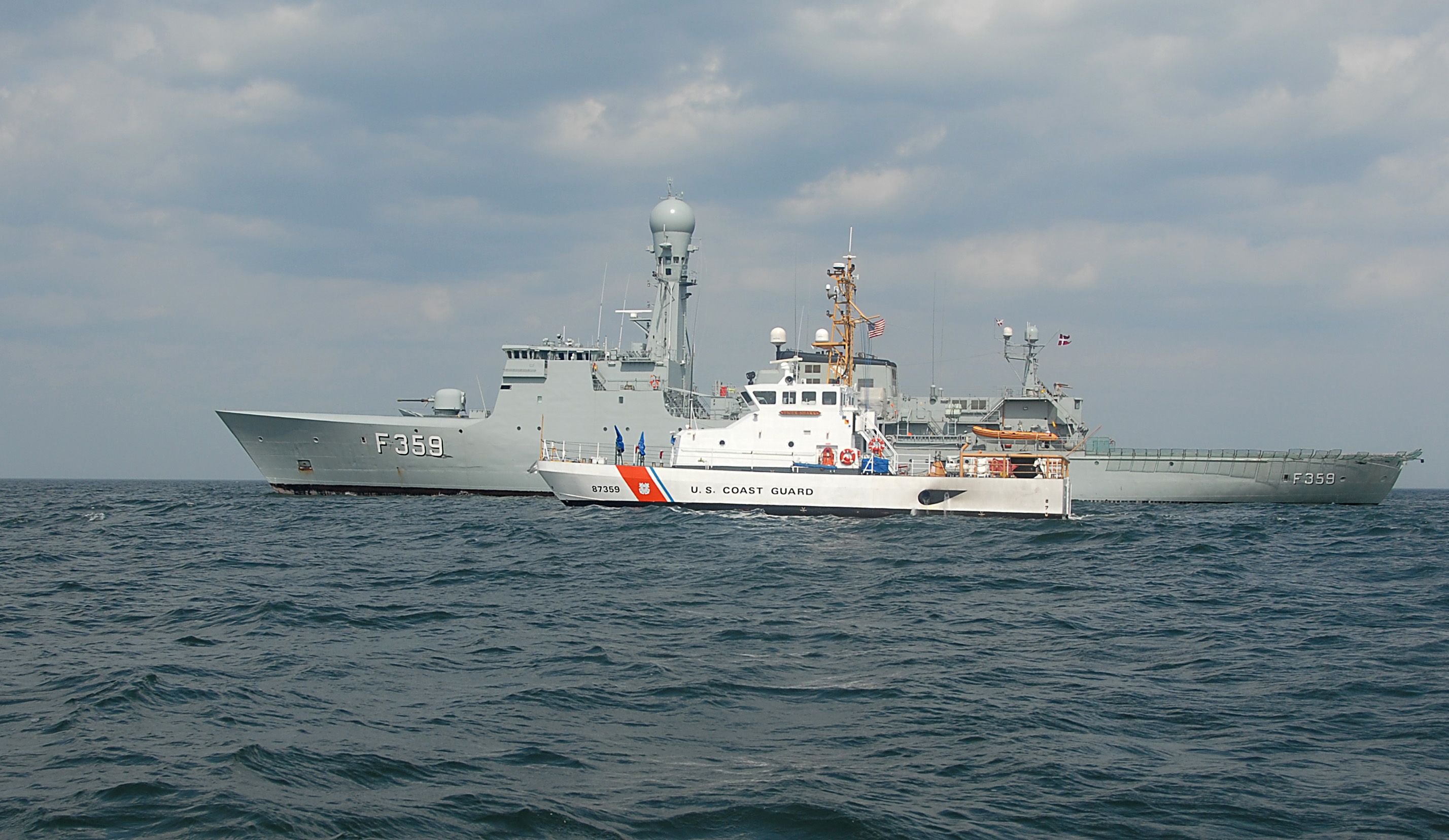
US Coast Guard cutter Tiger Shark pulls alongside HDMS Vædderen during a damage control exercise

The contemporary Royal Danish Navy has participated in the following international operations:

Year	Operation	Participating units
1990–91	Operation Desert Shield	Olfert Fischer (F355) (Niels Juel class)
1993–96	Operation Sharp Guard	Niels Juel F354 (Niels Juel class)
1999	Operation Allied Harvest	Lindormen N43 (Lindormen class)
29 November 2002 – 4 March 2003	Prestige Cleanup	Gunnar Seidenfaden A561 (Gunnar Thorson class)
2001–2002	Operation Active Endeavour	Olfert Fischer F355 (Niels Juel class) and Sælen S323 (Tumleren class)
2003	Operation Active Endeavour	Viben P562 and Ravnen P560 (Flyvefisken class)
2003	Operation Iraqi Freedom	Sælen S323 (Tumleren class), Olfert Fischer F355 (Niels Juel class)
2006–08	United Nations Interim Force in Lebanon (UNIFIL)	Glenten P557, Ravnen P560 (Flyvefisken class), Peter Tordenskiold F356 (Niels Juel class)
2007	Standing NRF Maritime Group 1	Olfert Fischer F355 (Niels Juel class)
2008	WFP protection force at the Horn of Africa	Thetis (F357) (Thetis class)
2008	Task Force 150	Danish Task Group (flag) and Absalon (L16) (flagship, Absalon class)
2009	Flagship SNMCMG1	Thetis F357 (Thetis class)
2009	Task Force 151	Absalon L16 (Absalon class)
2010	Flagship SNMG1	Esbern Snare (L17) and Absalon L16 (both Absalon class)
2011–2016	Operation Ocean Shield	Absalon L16 and Esben Snare L17 (Absalon class) Iver Huitfeldt F361 (Iver Huitfeldt class)
2012	Task Force 150	Danish Task Group (flag)
29 January-April 4 2024	Operation Prosperity Guardian	Iver Huitfeldt F361 (Iver Huitfeldt class)

== Vessels ==
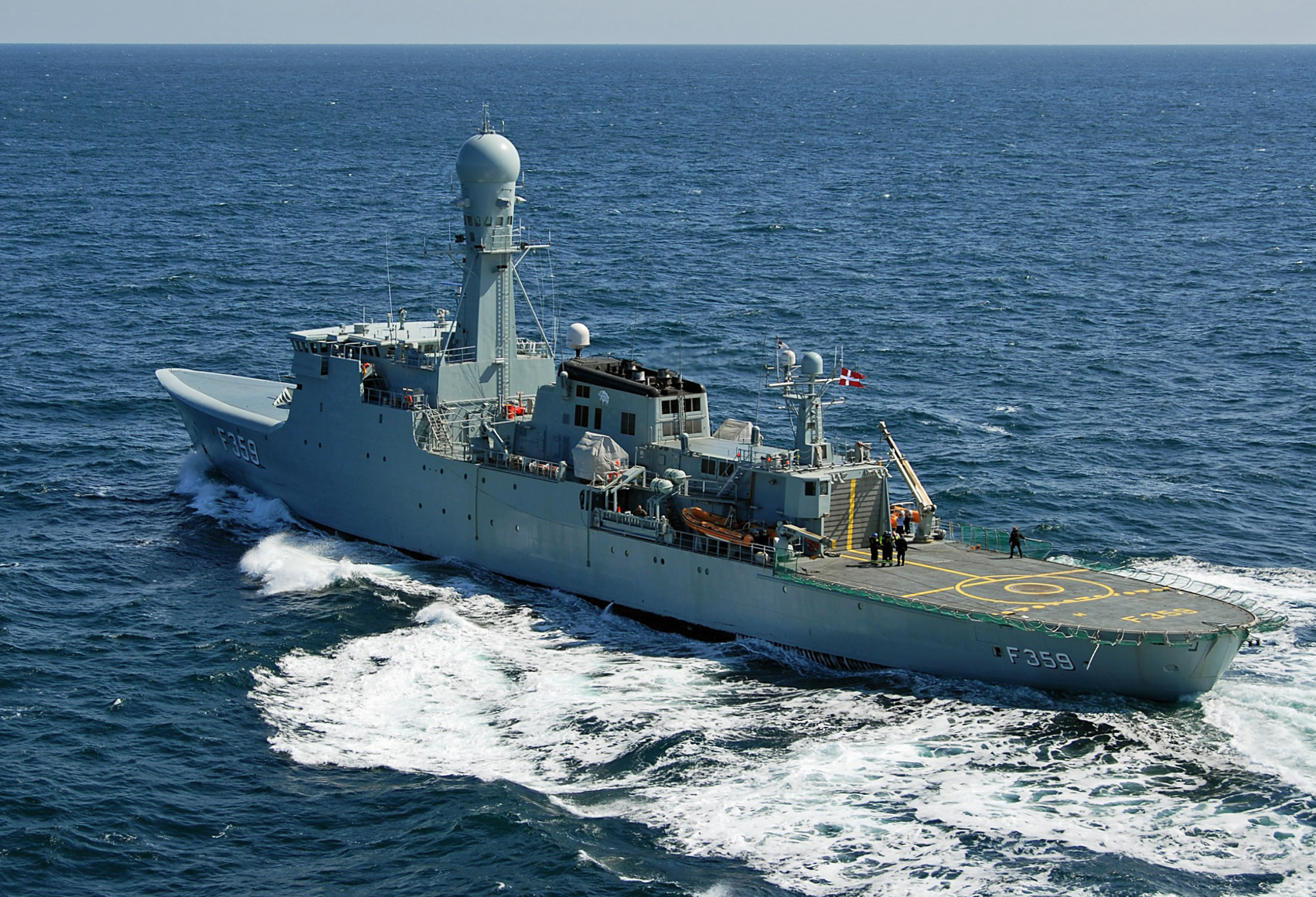
Vædderen (F359), Thetis class

The Danish navy currently operates:

- 12 larger vessels (displacement > 1,500 t(m))
- 4 medium-size vessels (1,500 t(m) > displacement > 500 t(m)), and
- 38 small vessels (500 t(m) > displacement > 15 t(m)),

as well as a number of rigid-hulled inflatable boats, boats etc.

The navy ship programs are generally of the "newer but fewer" type. Many of the vessels are of more recent dates (Absalon class from 2004 to 2005, Thetis class from 1991 to 1994 and Flyvefisken class from 1986 to 1995) or under replacement, i.e. the corvettes of the Niels Juel class (1978–1980) have been replaced with three new Iver Huitfeldt-class frigate for 2nd Squadron and the Barsø class (1969–1973) has been replaced with 6 Diana-class small patrol crafts. Finally all three Agdlek class vessels (1973–1979) have been replaced with the new Knud Rasmussen-class vessels.

In addition, the Royal Danish Navy and the German Navy are in cooperation in the "Ark Project". This agreement made the Ark Project responsible for the strategic sealift of Danish and German armed forces where the full-time charter of three roll-on-roll-off cargo and troop ships are ready for deployments. Furthermore, these ships are also kept available for the use of the other European NATO countries. In 2025, the Ark Project agreement with DFDS was extended for a further 6 years, beginning in 2026, and now covers up to 8 ships.

== Coastal assets ==
=== Naval Strike Missile Coastal Defence System ===
In 2025 a capability gap to shut down the Danish Straits was realised by the Danish navy, leading to the acquisition of an undisclosed amount of Kongsberg Defence Naval Strike Missile coastal defence batteries, expected to be delivered in 2026 with the first planned to be deployed at the Korsør and Frederikshavn naval installations

== Air service ==
=== Early years ===
The Royal Danish Navy has operated aircraft since 1912 either as a functional part of the navy or as flights conducted by the Royal Danish Air Force. Aviation pioneer Robert Svendsen purchased the first aircraft, a Henri Farman, and gave it to the navy who subsequently named it Glenten (kite). Later the same year, a private funding effort allowed them to purchase two Donnet-Leveque flying boats named Maagen (gull) and Ternen (tern).

At the outbreak of World War One the navy had two operational flying boats and five trained pilots making it possible to make daily reconnaissance flights over the Sound, monitoring German mine-laying activities.

From 1914 to 1917, Orlogsværftet (Danish naval yard) produced eight OV-flying boats and in 1915 and 1916 two naval flying stations were established in Copenhagen and Nyborg, mainly focusing on the two international seaways Øresund and Storebælt.

After the war the Danish production of aircraft was stopped due to several crashes and an international surplus of warplanes. Following British advice, five Avro 504s were purchased for training purposes, and based in Ringsted between the two important straits.

=== Fighter aircraft ===
In 1925, three land-based fighter aircraft were purchased to be based in Ringsted. A modified version of the Hawker Woodcock, the Hawker Danecock, was initially delivered from the UK while a following series of 12 aircraft were license-built by the Orlogsværft.

In 1928 the naval air service procured six Heinkel HE 8 floatplanes, with another 16 to be license-built by the Orlogsværft. As Germany were not allowed to produce military aircraft, the planes were labelled as mail planes, but they could easily be refitted with dual machine guns, radio equipment and a capacity for eight bombs.

The Heinkel had an unexpected Arctic employment in the early 1930s when a dispute over East Greenland caused the first deployment of aircraft, along with three naval ships, in Greenland. Following settlement of the dispute between Denmark and Norway the Heinkels were used in the efforts to map the frontiers of the island.

In 1933, two Hawker Nimrods were acquired to keep pace with the rapidly evolving technology of naval aircraft . A further ten aircraft were to be produced under licence at the Orlogsværft. The new aircraft made the air base in Ringsted inadequate and the naval air service was moved to the Avnø peninsula at southern Zealand.

=== Attack aircraft ===
In 1932, the navy purchased its first offensive capacity, two Hawker Horsley torpedo bombers with an option to produce a following series on the Orlogsværft. After four years of testing and practice, the naval air service had agreed to expand the offensive capacities with the Horsley, but at this time funding from the Danish government had been cut and no further torpedo bombers were acquired.

In the late 1930s, the government changed plans and increased the budget for military purchases following the German expansions in central Europe. In 1938, 12 Fairey P.4/34s were to be produced at Orlogsværftet, along with 12 Italian Macchi C.200 fighters. None of these were produced before the German invasion of Denmark on April 9, 1940.

=== Helicopters ===
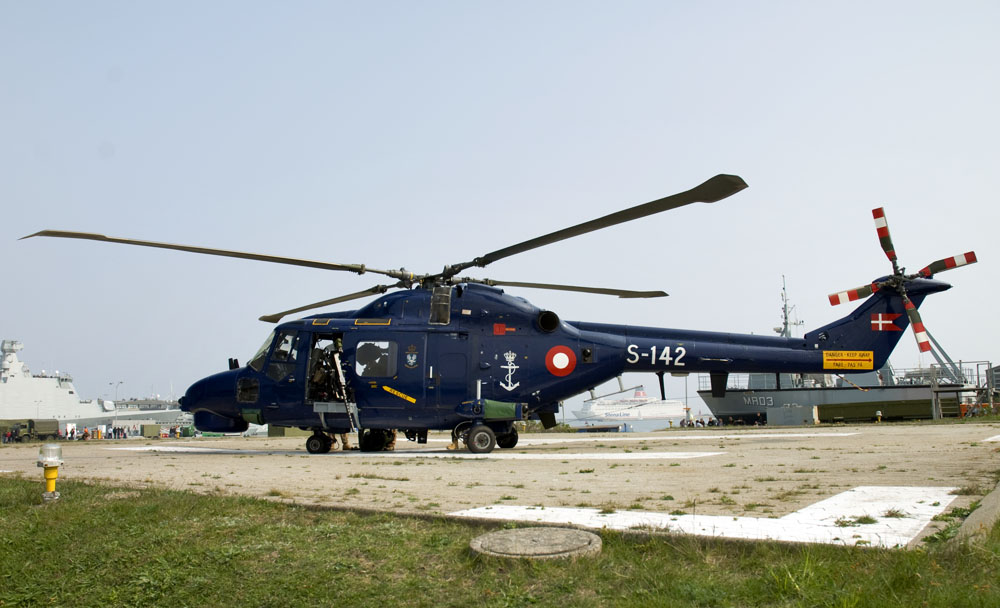
Westland Lynx while still in service in the Danish Navy

Helicopters are deployed to Danish naval ships from Eskadrille 723 of the Royal Danish Air Force. When initiated in 1962, the naval helicopters consisted of a flight of Alouette III helicopters of RDAF squadron 722.

Primarily for use on the Thetis class in operations in Greenland and the Faeroe Islands, but also on Absalon class in international operations and Knud Rasmussen class off Greenland as well as participating in exercises. The independent unit was established in 1977 as "Søværnets Flyvetjeneste" operating (Aérospatiale Alouette III (1977–1982) and Westland Lynx (1980–2018) helicopters. In 1989, the Navy had one Lynx 23, six Lynx 80, and two Lynx 90.

On 6 December 2012, the Royal Danish Air Force officially ordered nine MH-60R Seahawk helicopters, with all delivered in 2018, following a competition on the procurement involving the NH90, AgustaWestlands AW159 Wildcat and the AW101 along with Sikorsky's other bid H-92 Superhawk.

== Ranks and insignia ==
=== Commissioned officer ranks ===
The rank insignia of commissioned officers.

NATO code	OF-10	OF-9	OF-8	OF-7	OF-6	OF-5	OF-4	OF-3	OF-2	OF-1
Royal Danish Navy
Royal Danish Navy		Admiral	Viceadmiral	Kontreadmiral	Flotilleadmiral	Kommandør	Kommandørkaptajn	Orlogskaptajn	Kaptajnløjtnant	Premierløjtnant	Løjtnant
Danish Pay Grade		M406	M405	M404	M403	M402	M401	M332 M331 M322	M321	M312	M311

=== Other ranks ===
The rank insignia of non-commissioned officers and enlisted personnel.

NATO code	OR-9	OR-8	OR-7	OR-6	OR-5		OR-4	OR-3	OR-2	OR-1
Royal Danish Navy
Royal Danish Navy	Chefsergent	Seniorsergent	Oversergent		Sergent	Sergent SØ	Korporal	Marinespecialist	Marineoverkonstabel	Marinekonstabel
Danish Pay Grade	M232	M231	M221		M212	M211	M113	M112

Branch of Service

Våben, Artilleri
(Gunner)

Våben, Torpedo
(Torpedo)

Kommunikation
(Communication)

== See also ==
- Submarines in the Royal Danish Navy

== Bibliography ==
- Ledet, Michel (March 2002). "Le Heinkel HE 8". Avions: Toute l'Aéronautique et son histoire (in French) (108): 36–45. ISSN 1243-8650.
- Ledet, Michel (April 2002). "Le Heinkel HE 8". Avions: Toute l'Aéronautique et son histoire (in French) (109): 30–38. ISSN 1243-8650.
