= HDMS Olfert Fischer (F355) =

1980 Niels Juel-class corvette

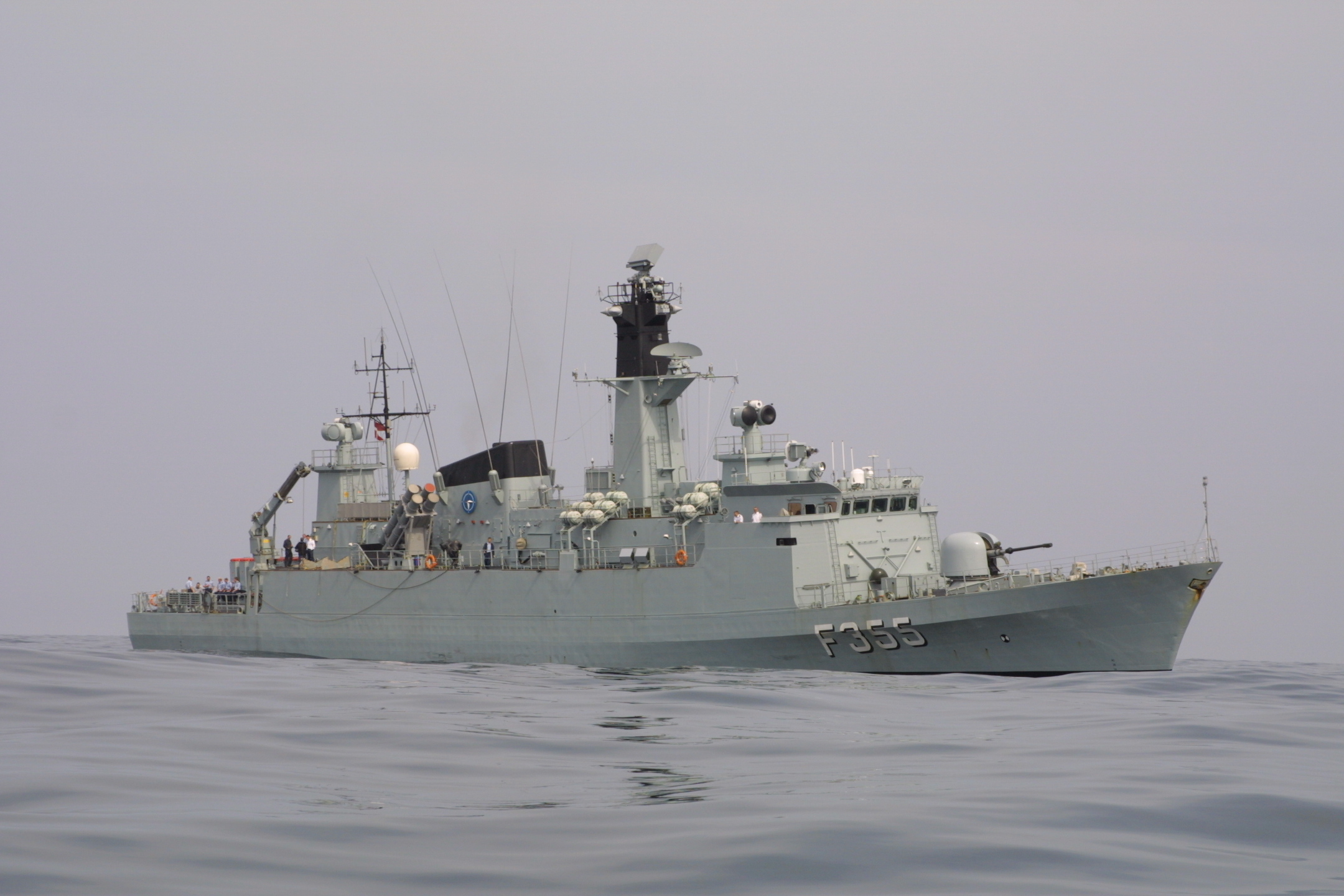
- HDMS Olfert Fischer in 2003

History

Denmark
- Name: Olfert Fischer
- Namesake: Olfert Fischer
- Builder: Aalborg Værft, in Aalborg, Denmark
- Laid down: 6 December 1978
- Launched: 12 January 1980
- Commissioned: 16 October 1981
- Decommissioned: 18 August 2009
- Identification: MMSI number: 219520000; Callsign: OUES
- Fate: Scrapped in 2013

General characteristics
- Class & type: Niels Juel-class corvette
- Displacement: 1,100 tons standard; 1,320 tons full load
- Length: 84 m (275 ft 7 in) between perpendiculars; 88 m (288 ft 9 in) overall
- Beam: 10.3 m (33 ft 10 in)
- Draught: 4.8 m (15 ft 9 in)
- Propulsion: CODOG: 1 × General Electric LM2500 gas turbine (25,700 shp; 19,200 kW); 1 × MTU 20V956 TB82 diesel engine (4,800 bhp; 3,600 kW); 2 × controllable pitch propellers
- Speed: 26 knots (48 km/h; 30 mph) maximum; 20 knots (37 km/h; 23 mph) on diesel alone
- Range: 800 nmi (1,500 km; 920 mi) at 28 knots (52 km/h; 32 mph); 2,500 nmi (4,600 km; 2,900 mi) at 18 knots (33 km/h; 21 mph)
- Complement: 18 officers, 73 enlisted
- Sensors & processing systems: Radar: 2 × Terma Scanter Mil 009 navigational; 1 × EADS TRS-3D air search; 1 × CelsiusTech 9GR 600 surface search; 1 × CelsiusTech 9 LV 200 gun fire control; 1 × General Dynamics Mk 95 missile fire control; Sonar: Plessey PMS-26
- Electronic warfare & decoys: Rascall Cutlass B-1 intercept; Telgon HFD/F; 4 × 6-round Seagnat Mk 36 chaff launchers
- Armament: 1 × Otobreda 76 mm gun; 8 × RGM-84C Harpoon SSM launchers (2 quad mountings); 1 × Mod 3 VLS Sea Sparrow SAM launcher (12 missiles); 2 × FIM-92A Stinger SAM launchers; 2 × 20 mm Oerlikon anti-aircraft guns; 7 × 12.7 mm M/01 LvSa machine guns; 1 × Mk 3 Depth charge launcher
- Notes: Taken from:

Service record
- Part of: 2. Squadron, 21st Division, KDM
- Operations: Gulf War (1991); Iraq War (2003)

HDMS Olfert Fischer (F355) was a Niels Juel-class corvette of the Kongelige Danske Marine (Royal Danish Navy, KDM). The vessel was laid down in December 1978 and commissioned in October 1981. The corvette operated in the Persian Gulf on two occasions, first in 1990 and 1991 as part of the multinational fleet enforcing the United Nations sanctions against Iraq, then again in 2003 in support of the United States-led invasion of Iraq. Olfert Fischer was deployed as part of the NATO Standing Naval Force Atlantic (and its successor, the Standing NATO Response Force Maritime Group 1) on at least four occasions during her career.

Olfert Fischer and her two sister ships were decommissioned in August 2009 and scrapped in 2013. They were replaced by vessels of the Iver Huitfeldt class.

== Design ==
The corvettes were fitted with an Otobreda 76 mm main gun, two quad RGM-84C Harpoon surface-to-surface missile (SSM) launchers, a Mod 3 VLS Sea Sparrow surface-to-air missile (SAM) launcher carrying 12 missiles, two FIM-92A Stinger SAM launchers, two 20 mm Oerlikon anti-aircraft guns, seven 12.7 mm M/01 LvSa machine guns, and a Mark 3 depth charge launcher.

Olfert Fischer's radar suite consisted of two Terma Scanter Mil 009 units for navigation, an EADS TRS-3D air search unit, and a CelsiusTech 9GR 600 surface search unit. Fire control was provided by a CelsiusTech 9 LV 200 gun radar, and a General Dynamics Mk 95 missile radar. She was fitted with a Plessey PMS-26 hull-mounted sonar. The corvette was fitted with a Rascall Cutlass B-1 intercept unit, a Telgon HFD/F unit, and four 6-round Seagnat Mk 36 chaff launchers.

== Construction ==
The three ships were built by Aalborg Værft, at their shipyard in Aalborg, Denmark. Olfert Fischer was the second to be built: she was laid down on 6 December 1978, and launched on 12 January 1980.

Although scheduled to commission on 25 May 1981, a fire broke out in the engine room eleven days prior, and the time required to repair the ship meant that she missed this date. Olfert Fischer entered service on 16 October 1981. The corvette, along with her two sister ships, were based at Korsør on Sealand Island.

== Operational history ==
Following the Iraqi invasion and occupation of Kuwait at the start of August 1990, the United Nations imposed sanctions against Iraq, and asked that member nations contribute forces to help implement them. On 31 August, the Danish Parliament decided that a single ship, Olfert Fischer, would make up the Danish contribution. The corvette was to enforce the UN sanctions only; she was not to become involved in the developing Gulf War. She was accompanied and supported by a Norwegian supply ship. The Gulf War deployment, which ended in September 1991, was the first time a Danish warship had operated outside the European region. The deployment marked a change in Danish attitudes and actions towards international security and foreign policy.

During 1992, 1994, and 1995, Olfert Fischer was assigned to the NATO Standing Naval Force Atlantic.

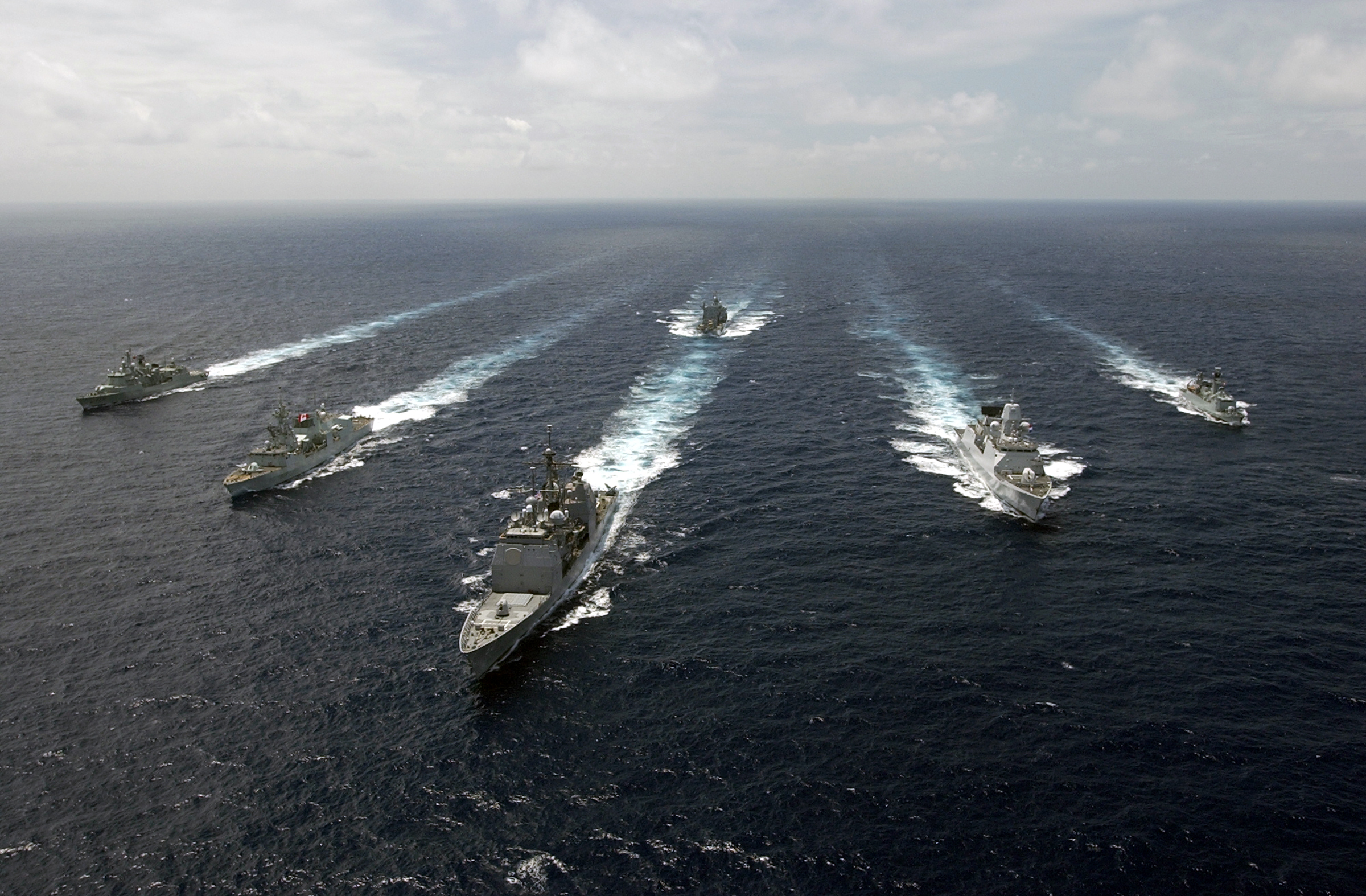
Six ships of Standing NATO Maritime Group (SNMG) 1 sailing in formation in 2007. Olfert Fischer is the rightmost vessel.

The corvette completed her mid-life overhaul in December 2001; she was the last to do so. During the refit, the single octuple Sea Sparrow launcher was replaced with two StanFlex modular mission payload slots (which are normally fitted with two six-round Sea Sparrow launchers), while the air search radar was updated.

In 2003, Olfert Fischer, the submarine Sælen, and a 380-strong force of soldiers were sent to the Persian Gulf region to support the United States-led invasion of Iraq.

During 2007, the corvette was assigned to the Standing NATO Response Force Maritime Group 1.

== Decommissioning and fate ==
Olfert Fischer and the other two Niels Juel-class corvettes were decommissioned on 18 August 2009. They were replaced by the three Iver Huitfeldt-class frigates.
