= Aalborg Shipyard =

Shipyard in Aalborg, Denmark

Coordinates: 57.028811°N 9.917771°E

Aalborg Shipyard (Danish: Aalborg Værft A/S) was a shipyard located in Aalborg, Denmark.

Founded in 1912 by brothers Immanuel Stuhr and Peter Philip Stuhr, the shipyard was founded under the name Stuhr Engine and Ship Construction, a development of their father's business. From 1937 until the yard closed in 1988, it was owned by J. Lauritzen A/S.

== Ships built at Aalborg Shipyard ==
Build No.	Built	Name of vessel	Ordering company
42	1930	MF Heimdal	Danish State Railways
?	1942	Eisvogel	Kriegsmarine
91	1951	MS Nordlys	Det Bergenske Dampskibsselskab
93	1952	MS Håkon Jarl	Det Nordenfjeldske Dampskibsselskab
98	1952	MS Polarlys	Det Bergenske Dampskibsselskab
101	1957	Thala Dan	J. Lauritzen A/S
104	1955	MS Meteor	Det Bergenske Dampskibsselskab
110	1953	Tjaldur, AP47 Aquiles, Pomaire	p/f Skipafelagið Føroyar, Tórshavn, Færøerne, Armada de Chile
134	1961	Neck Egense	Neck Egense Ferry Service
147	1964	MF Esbjerg	Danish State Railways
156	1964	Alba	Port of Dublin
159	1965	Goliath Thy	Svitzer Wijsmuller
200	1974	MS Dana Regina	DFDS
210	1978	MS Dana Anglia	DFDS
213	1976	Holger Danske	Danish State Railways
214	1977	St Columba	Sealink
217	1978	Niels Juel	Royal Danish Navy
218	1980	Olfert Fischer	Royal Danish Navy
219	1979	Peter Tordenskiold	Royal Danish Navy
220	1977	Goliath Carl	Svitzer Wijsmuller
240	1981	Goliath Goelen	Svitzer Wijsmuller
234	1982	MS Tropicale	Carnival Cruise Lines
245	1983	Arahura	New Zealand Railways Corporation
246	1985	MS Holiday	Carnival Cruise Lines
249	1986	MS Akademik Zavaritskiy	

== Closure ==
In 1988, the company was split into five separate companies:

- Danyard Aalborg, part of Royal Denship
- Aalborg steelworks
- Aalborg Industries (Boilers)
- Norks Industrial Services (NIS)
- Danish Railway Club (Limfjord path).

In 2005 the former yard area was cleared, the only building surviving demolition the 1912 machine shop, while the dry dock continues yacht production, leased by Danyard Aalborg. Today, the former yard is covered with new home and office developments.
