= List of active Royal Danish Navy ships =

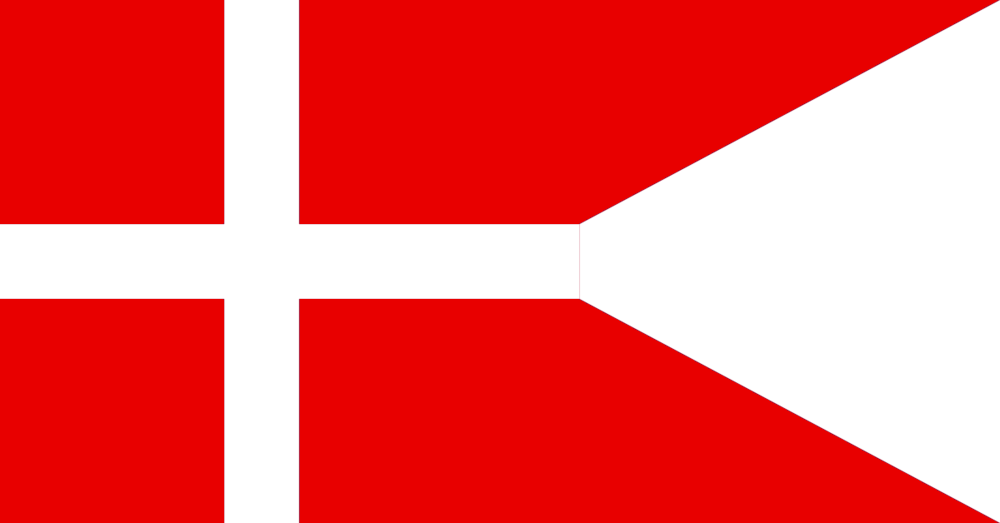
Naval ensign of Royal Danish Navy

This is a list of the active vessels of the Royal Danish Navy.

== Current fleet ==
=== Navy fleet ===
==== Combat fleet ====
Class	In service	Origin	Picture	Type	Ship	No.	Comm.	Builder	Displacement	Notes
Frigates (9)
Absalon class	2	Denmark		ASW Frigate	Absalon	F341	2004	Odense Staalskibsværft	6,600 tonnes	Flexible mission capabilities through modules (naval warfare, land attack, command ship, hospital ship, disaster relief).
Absalon class	2	Denmark		ASW Frigate	Esbern Snare	F342	2005	Odense Staalskibsværft	6,600 tonnes	Flexible mission capabilities through modules (naval warfare, land attack, command ship, hospital ship, disaster relief).
Iver Huitfeldt class	3	Denmark		Air-defence frigate	Iver Huitfeldt	F361	2011	Odense Staalskibsværft	6,645 tonnes	Flexible mission capabilities through modules (naval warfare, land attack, command ship, hospital ship, disaster relief).
Iver Huitfeldt class	3	Denmark		Air-defence frigate	Peter Willemoes	F362	2011	Odense Staalskibsværft	6,645 tonnes	Flexible mission capabilities through modules (naval warfare, land attack, command ship, hospital ship, disaster relief).
Iver Huitfeldt class	3	Denmark		Air-defence frigate	Niels Juel	F363	2011	Odense Staalskibsværft	6,645 tonnes	Flexible mission capabilities through modules (naval warfare, land attack, command ship, hospital ship, disaster relief).
Thetis class Stanflex 3000	4	Denmark		Oceanic patrol frigate	Thetis	F357	1991	Svendborg Skibsværft	3,500 tonnes	To be replaced by a frigate with ASW capacity.
Thetis class Stanflex 3000	4	Denmark		Oceanic patrol frigate	Triton	F358	1991	Svendborg Skibsværft	3,500 tonnes	To be replaced by a frigate with ASW capacity.
Thetis class Stanflex 3000	4	Denmark		Oceanic patrol frigate	Vædderen	F359	1992	Svendborg Skibsværft	3,500 tonnes	To be replaced by a frigate with ASW capacity.
Thetis class Stanflex 3000	4	Denmark		Oceanic patrol frigate	Hvidbjørnen	F360	1992	Svendborg Skibsværft	3,500 tonnes	To be replaced by a frigate with ASW capacity.
Offshore patrol vessels (9)
Knud Rasmussen class	3	Denmark		Arctic patrol ships	Knud Rasmussen	P570	2008	Karstensens Skibsværft	1,720 tonnes	
Knud Rasmussen class	3	Denmark		Arctic patrol ships	Ejnar Mikkelsen	P571	2009	Karstensens Skibsværft	1,720 tonnes	
Knud Rasmussen class	3	Denmark		Arctic patrol ships	Lauge Koch	P572	2017	Karstensens Skibsværft	1,720 tonnes	
Diana class	6	Denmark		Patrol vessel	Diana	P520	2007	Faaborg Værft A/S Karlskrona Varvet	246 tonnes	
Diana class	6	Denmark		Patrol vessel	Freja	P521	2007	Faaborg Værft A/S Karlskrona Varvet	246 tonnes	
Diana class	6	Denmark		Patrol vessel	Havfruen	P522	2008	Faaborg Værft A/S Karlskrona Varvet	246 tonnes	
Diana class	6	Denmark		Patrol vessel	Najaden	P523	2008	Faaborg Værft A/S Karlskrona Varvet	246 tonnes	
Diana class	6	Denmark		Patrol vessel	Nymfen	P524	2008	Faaborg Værft A/S Karlskrona Varvet	246 tonnes	
Diana class	6	Denmark		Patrol vessel	Rota	P525	2008	Faaborg Værft A/S Karlskrona Varvet	246 tonnes	
Light boats (35)
SB90E class	4	Sweden		Landing Craft Personnel	–	LCP1	2003 - 2004	Storebro Bruk	7.2 tonnes	Used from the Absalon class.
SB90E class	4	Sweden		Landing Craft Personnel	–	LCP2	2003 - 2004	Storebro Bruk	7.2 tonnes	Used from the Absalon class.
SB90E class	4	Sweden		Landing Craft Personnel	–	LCP3	2003 - 2004	Storebro Bruk	7.2 tonnes	Used from the Absalon class.
SB90E class	4	Sweden		Landing Craft Personnel	–	LCP4	2003 - 2004	Storebro Bruk	7.2 tonnes	Used from the Absalon class.
SB90E class	2	Sweden	Illustration, same variant, fully orange	Search and rescue boat	Dagmar	SAR1	2007	Storebro Bruk	7.2 tonnes	Used from the Knud Rasmussen class, modified with ice-reinforcements and upgraded engines.
SB90E class	2	Sweden	Illustration, same variant, fully orange	Search and rescue boat	Naja	SAR2	2007	Storebro Bruk	7.2 tonnes	Used from the Knud Rasmussen class, modified with ice-reinforcements and upgraded engines.
MHV RHIB	29	–		RHIB; Rigid-hulled inflatable boats	–	–	–	–	–	Used from various ships and vessels of the Navy.
Diving vessels (1)
Flyvefisken class SF300 - Serie 3	1	Denmark		Diving support vessel	Søløven	Y311 (former P563)	1996	Danyard	487 tonnes	Surveillance diving support since 2012, and can support MSF class ships.
Mine warfare ships (6)
MSF class Mindre standardfartøj	4	Denmark		Mine-sweeping remote control vessels	–	MSF1	1998	Danyard	125 tonnes	
MSF class Mindre standardfartøj	4	Denmark		Mine-sweeping remote control vessels	–	MSF2	1998	Danyard	125 tonnes	
MSF class Mindre standardfartøj	4	Denmark		Mine-sweeping remote control vessels	–	MSF3	1999	Danyard	125 tonnes	
MSF class Mindre standardfartøj	4	Denmark		Mine-sweeping remote control vessels	–	MSF4	1999	Danyard	125 tonnes	
Holm class	2 (2 Holm class in this configuration)	Denmark		Minesweeper	Hirsholm	MSD5	2007	Danish yacht	125 tonnes	
Holm class	2 (2 Holm class in this configuration)	Denmark		Minesweeper	Saltholm	MSD6	2008	Danish yacht	125 tonnes	

=== Auxiliary ships ===
Class	In service	Origin	Picture	Type	Ship	No.	Comm.	Builder	Displacement	Notes
Logistic support vessels (4)
Sleipner class	1	Denmark		Logistic support ship	Sleipner	A559	1986	Åbenrå Shipyard A/S	465 tonnes	
Stena 4Runner I class	1	Italy		RO/RO; Roll-on / roll-off	Ark Forwarder	A98	2007	Societa Esercizio Cantieri	21,104 tonnes	Launched in 1998, chartered by Danish Navy since 2007 as part of the NATO Response Force.
–	1	France		RO/RO; Roll-on / roll-off	Tor Dania	–	2007	Societé Metallurgique & Navale Dunkerque-Normandie	21,491 tonnes	Launched in 1978, rebuilt in 1995, chartered by Danish Navy since 2007 as part of the NATO Response Force.
–	1	Italy		RO/RO; Roll-on / roll-off	Tor Futura	–	2004	Cantiere Navale Visentini	18,469 tonnes	Launched in 1996, chartered by Danish Navy since 2007 as part of the NATO Response Force.
Research vessels / environmental protection vessels (9)
Supply class	2	Denmark		Environmental protection vessel	Gunnar Thorson	A560	1996	Ørskov Christensen Stålskibsværft A/S	1,660 tonnes	
Supply class	2	Denmark		Environmental protection vessel	Gunnar Seidenfaden	A561	1996	Ørskov Christensen Stålskibsværft A/S	1,660 tonnes	
Holm class	2 (2 Holm class in this configuration)	Denmark		Hydrographical survey craft	Birkholm	A541	2006	Danish yacht	125 tonnes	
Holm class	2 (2 Holm class in this configuration)	Denmark		Hydrographical survey craft	Fyrholm	A542	2006	Danish yacht	125 tonnes	
Seatruck class	2	Denmark		Environmental protection vessel	Mette-Miljø	A562	1996	Carl B Hoffmann A/S (Esbjerg)	247 tonnes	
Seatruck class	2	Denmark		Environmental protection vessel	Marie-Miljø	A564	1996	Carl B Hoffmann A/S (Esbjerg)	247 tonnes	
Miljø class	3	Denmark		Environmental protection vessel	Miljø 101	Y340	1996	Eivinds plasticjolle- og bådeværft	16 tonnes	
Miljø class	3	Denmark		Environmental protection vessel	Miljø 102	Y341	1996	Eivinds plasticjolle- og bådeværft	16 tonnes	
Miljø class	3	Denmark		Environmental protection vessel	Miljø 103	Y342	2008	Eivinds plasticjolle- og bådeværft	16 tonnes	
Training vessels (2)
Holm class	2 (2 Holm class in this configuration)	Denmark		Training boat	Ertholm	A543	2006	Danish yacht	159 tonnes	
Holm class	2 (2 Holm class in this configuration)	Denmark		Training boat	Alholm	A544	2007	Danish yacht	159 tonnes	
Tugboats
Arvak class	2	Denmark		Tugboat	Arvak	Y344	2002	Hvide Sande Skibs- & Baadebyggeri	–	
Arvak class	2	Denmark		Tugboat	Alsin	Y345	2002	Hvide Sande Skibs- & Baadebyggeri	–	
–	2	Denmark	–	Harbour tugboat	Balder	–	1983	Assens Skibsværft	32 tonnes	
–	2	Denmark	–	Harbour tugboat	Hermod	–	1983	Assens Skibsværft	32 tonnes	

=== Home guard ===
Class	In service	Origin	Picture	Type	Ship	No.	Comm.	Builder	Displacement	Notes
Patrol and SAR vessels (29)
MHV 800 class	18	Denmark	Flyvefisken class P555 Støren	Patrol and rescue vessel	Aldebaraan	MHV801	1992	Søby Værft	83 tonnes	
MHV 800 class	18	Denmark	Flyvefisken class P555 Støren	Patrol and rescue vessel	Carina	MHV802	1992	Søby Værft	83 tonnes	
MHV 800 class	18	Denmark	Flyvefisken class P555 Støren	Patrol and rescue vessel	Aries	MHV803	1993	Søby Værft	83 tonnes	
MHV 800 class	18	Denmark	Flyvefisken class P555 Støren	Patrol and rescue vessel	Andromeda	MHV804	1993	Søby Værft	83 tonnes	
MHV 800 class	18	Denmark	Flyvefisken class P555 Støren	Patrol and rescue vessel	Gemini	MHV805	1994	Søby Værft	83 tonnes	
MHV 800 class	18	Denmark	Flyvefisken class P555 Støren	Patrol and rescue vessel	Dubhe	MHV806	1994	Søby Værft	83 tonnes	
MHV 800 class	18	Denmark	Flyvefisken class P555 Støren	Patrol and rescue vessel	Jupiter	MHV807	1994	Søby Værft	83 tonnes	
MHV 800 class	18	Denmark	Flyvefisken class P555 Støren	Patrol and rescue vessel	Lyra	MHV808	1995	Søby Værft	83 tonnes	
MHV 800 class	18	Denmark	Flyvefisken class P555 Støren	Patrol and rescue vessel	Antares	MHV809	1995	Søby Værft	83 tonnes	
MHV 800 class	18	Denmark	Flyvefisken class P555 Støren	Patrol and rescue vessel	Luna	MHV810	1996	Søby Værft	83 tonnes	
MHV 800 class	18	Denmark	Flyvefisken class P555 Støren	Patrol and rescue vessel	Apollo	MHV811	1996	Søby Værft	83 tonnes	
MHV 800 class	18	Denmark	Flyvefisken class P555 Støren	Patrol and rescue vessel	Hercules	MHV812	1997	Søby Værft	83 tonnes	
MHV 800 class	18	Denmark	Flyvefisken class P555 Støren	Patrol and rescue vessel	Baunen	MHV813	1997	Søby Værft	83 tonnes	
MHV 800 class	18	Denmark	Flyvefisken class P555 Støren	Patrol and rescue vessel	Budstikken	MHV814	1998	Søby Værft	83 tonnes	
MHV 800 class	18	Denmark	Flyvefisken class P555 Støren	Patrol and rescue vessel	Kureren	MHV815	1999	Søby Værft	83 tonnes	
MHV 800 class	18	Denmark	Flyvefisken class P555 Støren	Patrol and rescue vessel	Patrioten	MHV816	2000	Søby Værft	83 tonnes	
MHV 800 class	18	Denmark	Flyvefisken class P555 Støren	Patrol and rescue vessel	Partisan	MHV817	2000	Søby Værft	83 tonnes	
MHV 800 class	18	Denmark	Flyvefisken class P555 Støren	Patrol and rescue vessel	Sabotøren	MHV851	2000	Søby Værft	83 tonnes	
MHV900 class	12	Denmark	Flyvefisken class P555 Støren	Patrol and rescue vessel	Enø	MHV901	2003	Søby Værft	87 tonnes	
MHV900 class	12	Denmark	Flyvefisken class P555 Støren	Patrol and rescue vessel	Manø	MHV902	2004	Søby Værft	87 tonnes	
MHV900 class	12	Denmark	Flyvefisken class P555 Støren	Patrol and rescue vessel	Hjortø	MHV903	2005	Søby Værft	87 tonnes	
MHV900 class	12	Denmark	Flyvefisken class P555 Støren	Patrol and rescue vessel	Lyø	MHV904	2005	Søby Værft	87 tonnes	
MHV900 class	12	Denmark	Flyvefisken class P555 Støren	Patrol and rescue vessel	Askø	MHV905	2006	Søby Værft	87 tonnes	
MHV900 class	12	Denmark	Flyvefisken class P555 Støren	Patrol and rescue vessel	Fænø	MHV906	2007	Søby Værft	87 tonnes	
MHV900 class	12	Denmark	Flyvefisken class P555 Støren	Patrol and rescue vessel	Hvidsten	MHV907	2008	Søby Værft	87 tonnes	
MHV900 class	12	Denmark	Flyvefisken class P555 Støren	Patrol and rescue vessel	Brigaden	MHV908	2008	Søby Værft	87 tonnes	
MHV900 class	12	Denmark	Flyvefisken class P555 Støren	Patrol and rescue vessel	Speditøren	MHV909	2009	Søby Værft	87 tonnes	
MHV900 class	12	Denmark	Flyvefisken class P555 Støren	Patrol and rescue vessel	Ringen	MHV910	2009	Søby Værft	87 tonnes	
MHV900 class	12	Denmark	Flyvefisken class P555 Støren	Patrol and rescue vessel	Bopa	MHV911	2009	Søby Værft	87 tonnes	
MHV900 class	12	Denmark	Flyvefisken class P555 Støren	Patrol and rescue vessel	Holger Danske	MHV912	2011	Søby Værft	87 tonnes	

=== Royal yacht fleet ===
Class	In service	Origin	Picture	Type	Ship	No.	Comm.	Builder	Displacement	Notes
Yacht
–	1	Denmark		Royal Yacht	Dannebrog	A540	1932	Orlogsverftet	1,238 tonnes	Can participate to surveillance and sea-rescue missions.
Sailing yachts
–	2	–	Illustration with comparable boat	Sailing vessel	Svanen	Y101	–	–	–	
–	2	–	Illustration with comparable boat	Sailing vessel	Thyra	Y102	–	–	–	

== Ships on order ==
Class	In service	Origin	Picture	Type	Comm.	Builder	Displacement	Notes
Multirole vessels (6 on order)
MPV80 class	6	Denmark	–	Modular vessels (OPV / research vessels)	2029 (planned)	Odense Maritime Technology, Terma	1,100 tonnes	Agreement signed in June 2023 for the development of the ships. Expected to feature anti-surface warfare missiles as of 2024.
–	–	Denmark; Poland (hull construction)	–	Multirole vessels (mine-laying vessel / environmental vessel)	2029 (planned)	Orlogsskibe Danmark K/S consortium (OSK Design A/S / Karstensens Skibsværft A/S / Hvide Sande Shipyard)	–	Contract signed in February 2026. Quantity unknown, 4 were planned in 2025.
Underwater infrastructure protection ships (1 on order)
VARD 4 19 class	1	Norway		Seabed warfare vessel	2026	Vard Ålesund	–	Purchased from Danish Navigare Capital Partners A/S. It is the Norwind Helm.

== Planned future fleet ==
=== Danish navy ===
==== Submarines ====
In June 2023, Denmark announced considering to reintroduce submarines into its navy. The need to secure the Faroe Islands, Greenland, the Arctic and the Baltic Sea justifies this consideration. An alternative mentioned by Denmark would be a close cooperation with allies.

==== Surface combat fleet ====
Denmark is considering its options regarding the future replacement of the Thetis class and the Absalon class. A potential successor of the Thetis class was unveiled in September 2023 by OSK Design, the Arctic Frigate. The Danish Navy mentioned that it would need the successor of the Thetis to enter service in 2032.

In May 2024, several ministries and industry representatives unveiled a report for the long-term strategy of the Danish Navy. The plan is focusing on a 20-25 year time period. During that period, 15 frigates and offshore patrol vessels would need to be acquired, and 40 lighter vessels would be needed.

In March 2025, the Danish Armed Forces announced a new plan for the future that includes:

- Next generation of large vessels (frigates and ships for the Atlantic and the Arctic):
  - Air defence frigates
  - Arctic ships, additional ships planned to be ordered
  - Icebreaker capacity to be assessed in collaboration with allies
- 4 vessels designed for mine-laying / mine warfare, and marine environmental response. The primary role is to focus on environmental tasks (oil and chemical spills), and the mine warfare would be a secondary role.
- 1 ship with drones and sonar systems to monitor underwater data cables, electricity lines, and gas pipelines.
- Underwater drones and autonomous units to be developed for the Danish Navy.

=== Home guard ===
In March 2025, the Danish government announced a new plan for the future of the Home Guard that includes:

- 21 vessels to be used for maritime surveillance, port guarding, rescue, marine environmental tasks, host nation support.
