= HDMS Diana =

The following ships of the Royal Danish Navy have borne the name HDMS Diana:

- HDMS Diana (1804), a sloop of war in service 1804–1809
- HDMS Diana (1818), a corvette in service 1818-1822
- HDMS Diana (1823), a frigate in service 1823–1850
- HDMS Diana (1863), a schooner corvette in service 1864–1903
- HDMS Diana, a patrol vessel in service 1917–1935
- HDMS Diana (F345) a Triton-class corvette launched in 1954 and decommissioned in 1974.
- HDMS Diana (P520) a Diana-class patrol vessel launched in 2006.
