= HDMS Peter Willemoes =

A number of vessels of the Royal Danish Navy have borne the name Peter Willemoes, after Peter Willemoes.

- HDMS Willemoes (1861), a screw gun boat, in service 1861–1933.
- HDMS Willemoes (1943) , a Najaden-class torpedo boat, in service 1947–1966.
- HDMS Willemoes (P549) , a Willemoes-class missile boat, in service 1977–2000.
- HDMS Peter Willemoes (F362) , a Iver Huitfeldt-class frigate , in service since 2011.
