= Holm-class multi-purpose vessel =

Class of Danish multi-purpose vessel

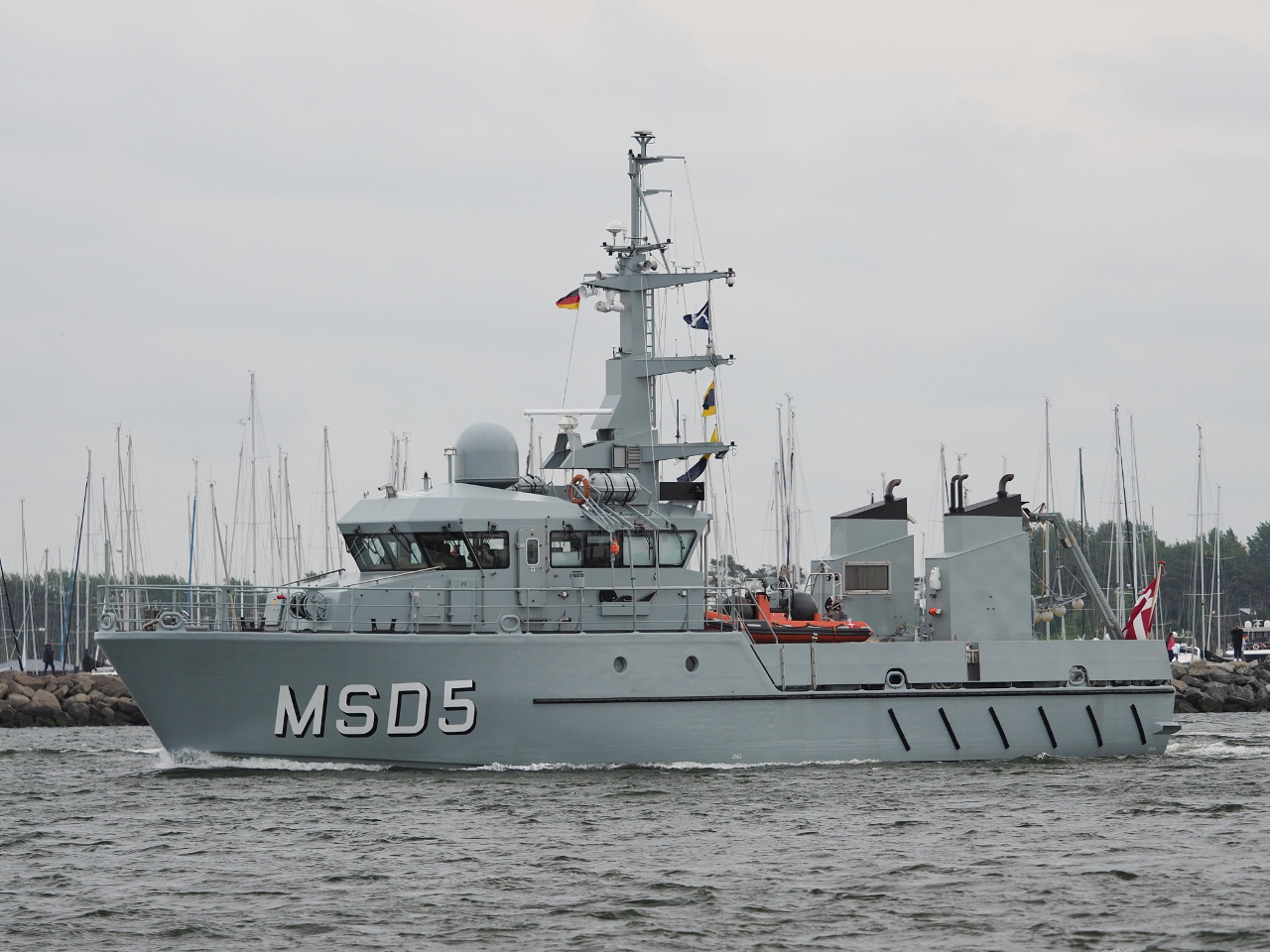
- HDMS Hirsholm departing Rostock in 2025

Class overview
- Builders: Danish Yacht A/S, Skagen
- Operators: Royal Danish Navy
- Built: 2005–2008
- In commission: 2006–present
- Planned: 6
- Completed: 6
- Active: 6

General characteristics
- Type: Minesweeper; Hydrographic survey vessel; Training ship
- Displacement: 128 t (126 long tons)
- Length: 28.90 m (94 ft 10 in)
- Beam: 6.40 m (21 ft 0 in)
- Draught: 1.80 m (5 ft 11 in)
- Propulsion: 2× Scania DC 16. diesel engines with 375 kW each
- Speed: 13 knots (24 km/h; 15 mph) (maximum)
- Range: 600 nmi (1,100 km) at 10 knots (19 km/h; 12 mph)
- Boats & landing craft carried: 1 x RHIB
- Complement: Space for 10
- Crew: 3

The Holm class is a series of six multi-purpose vessels operated by the Royal Danish Navy. The vessels are named after small Danish islands or islets (in Danish, "holm" means islet), reflecting their primary role in coastal waters. Designed and built by Danish Yacht A/S in Skagen, they are known for their flexible design, which allows them to be adapted for different missions.

== Design and roles ==
The Holm-class vessels are part of a larger Danish naval procurement program aimed at creating a modular fleet, which is achieved with the StanFlex modular mission payload system. They are built using a composite material known as a FRP (fibre-reinforced plastic) sandwich construction, which is also used in other Danish naval vessels like the Diana-class patrol vessels. This construction method reduces maintenance costs and gives the vessels a non-magnetic hull, a useful feature for mine countermeasures.

The vessels are divided into three groups of two, each designed for a specific primary role:

- Hydrographic survey vessels (Birkhom and Fyrholm): These are equipped for hydrographic surveying and are used to map Danish waters.
- Training vessels (Ertholm and Alholm): These are used for naval cadet training and carry a small complement of three crew members with lodging for up to ten trainees.
- Mine countermeasures vessels (Hirsholm and Saltholm): These vessels can operate remote-controlled mine clearance drones or serve as support vessels. Their non-magnetic hull is critical for this mission.

The multi-role nature of the Holm class is a key feature, allowing the Royal Danish Navy to optimize its fleet for various tasks without needing specialized hulls for each. They have a StanFlex flexible container position at the stern, which can be fitted with equipment for environmental protection, a crane, or stores, depending on the mission.

== Ships in class ==
Hull number	Name	Builder	Launched	Commissioned	Decommissioned	Status	Main role	Notes
A541	Birkholm	Danish Yachts, Skagen	10 December 2005	27 January 2006		Operational	Hydrographic survey vessel	
A542	Fyrholm	Danish Yachts, Skagen	5 August 2006	21 December 2006		Operational	Hydrographic survey vessel	
A543	Ertholm	Danish Yachts, Skagen	25 March 2006	8 May 2006		Operational	Training	
A544	Alholm	Danish Yachts, Skagen	6 January 2007	7 February 2007		Operational	Training	
MSD5	Hirsholm	Danish Yachts, Skagen	5 May 2007	29 May 2007		Operational	Minesweeper	
MSD6	Saltholm	Danish Yachts, Skagen	3 November 2007	28 March 2008		Operational	Minesweeper	
