= HDMS Niels Juel (F363) =

Iver Huitfeldt-class frigate

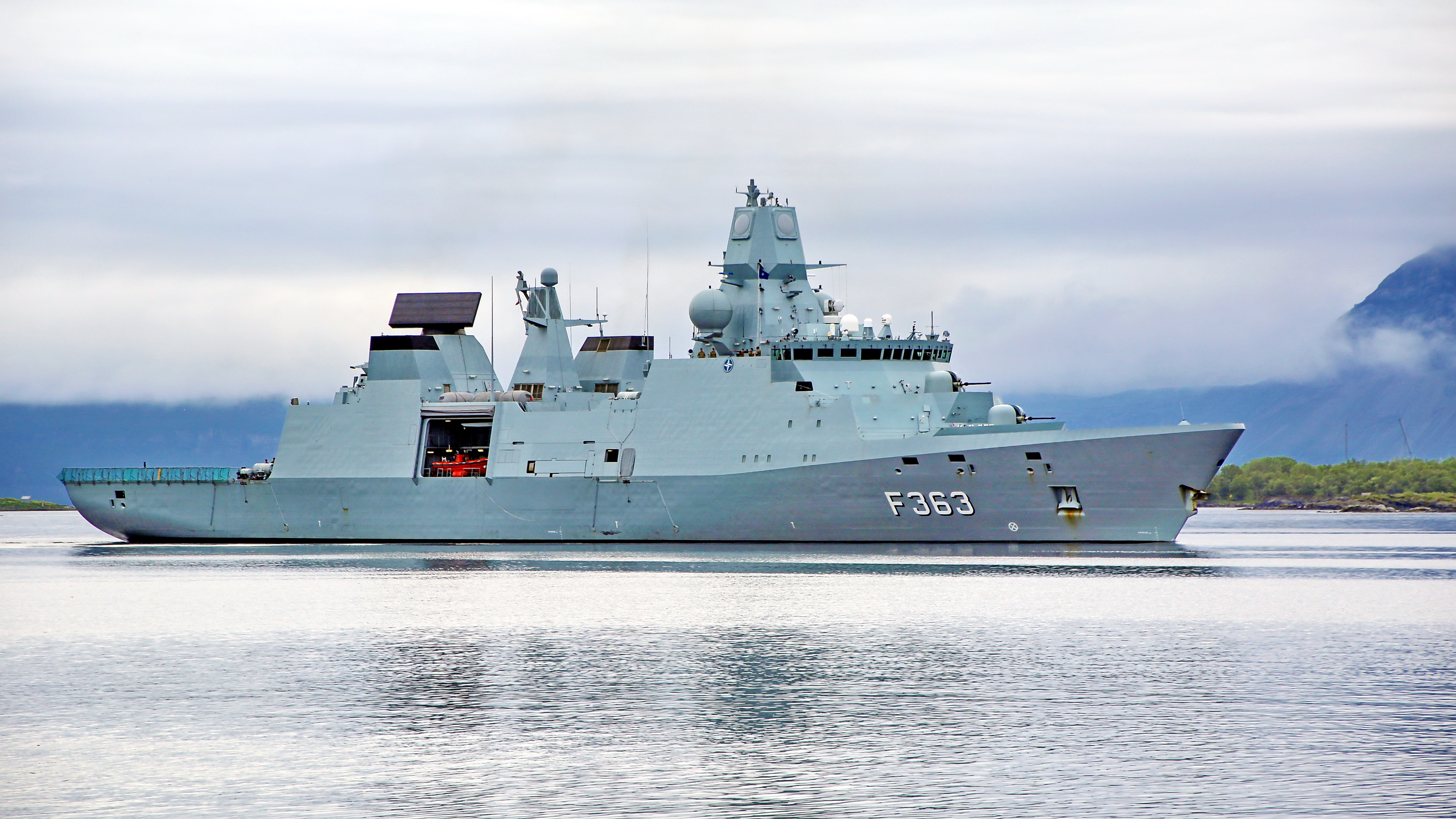
- HDMS Niels Juel entering Harstad on 22 June 2018

History

Denmark
- Name: Niels Juel
- Namesake: Niels Juel
- Builder: Odense Steel Shipyard, Odense
- Laid down: 22 December 2009
- Launched: 21 December 2010
- Commissioned: 7 November 2011
- Home port: Korsør
- Identification: MMSI number: 219105000; Callsign: OVVC; Pennant number: F363
- Motto: Nec Temere, Nec Timide; (Neither fearfully nor timidly)
- Status: Active
- Badge

General characteristics
- Notes: The three ship class have shared characteristics. Main article: Iver Huitfeldt-class frigate § Design

HDMS Niels Juel (F363) is an Iver Huitfeldt-class frigate in the Royal Danish Navy. The ship is named after Niels Juel, a 17th-century Danish admiral.

== Design ==
The design is shared across the three ship class.

== Construction and service history ==
The frigate was laid down on 22 December 2009 and launched on 21 December 2010 by Odense Steel Shipyard, at Odense. The vessel was commissioned on 7 November 2011.

From 7 May to 13 May 2022, Niels Juel took part in Exercise Mjolner 2022 held in the Arctic region. The vessel conducted its first launches of the SM-2 missiles.

From March 2023 she was deployed for three months to a NATO naval force at very high alert joining task group 441.01.

On 4 April 2024, shipping lanes and airspace in part of the Great Belt strait in Denmark were closed for hours after a missile launcher aboard the ship malfunctioned during a naval exercise.

In September 2025, Niels Juel took part in the Danish-led NATO Arctic Light 2025 exercise off Greenland.

== Gallery ==
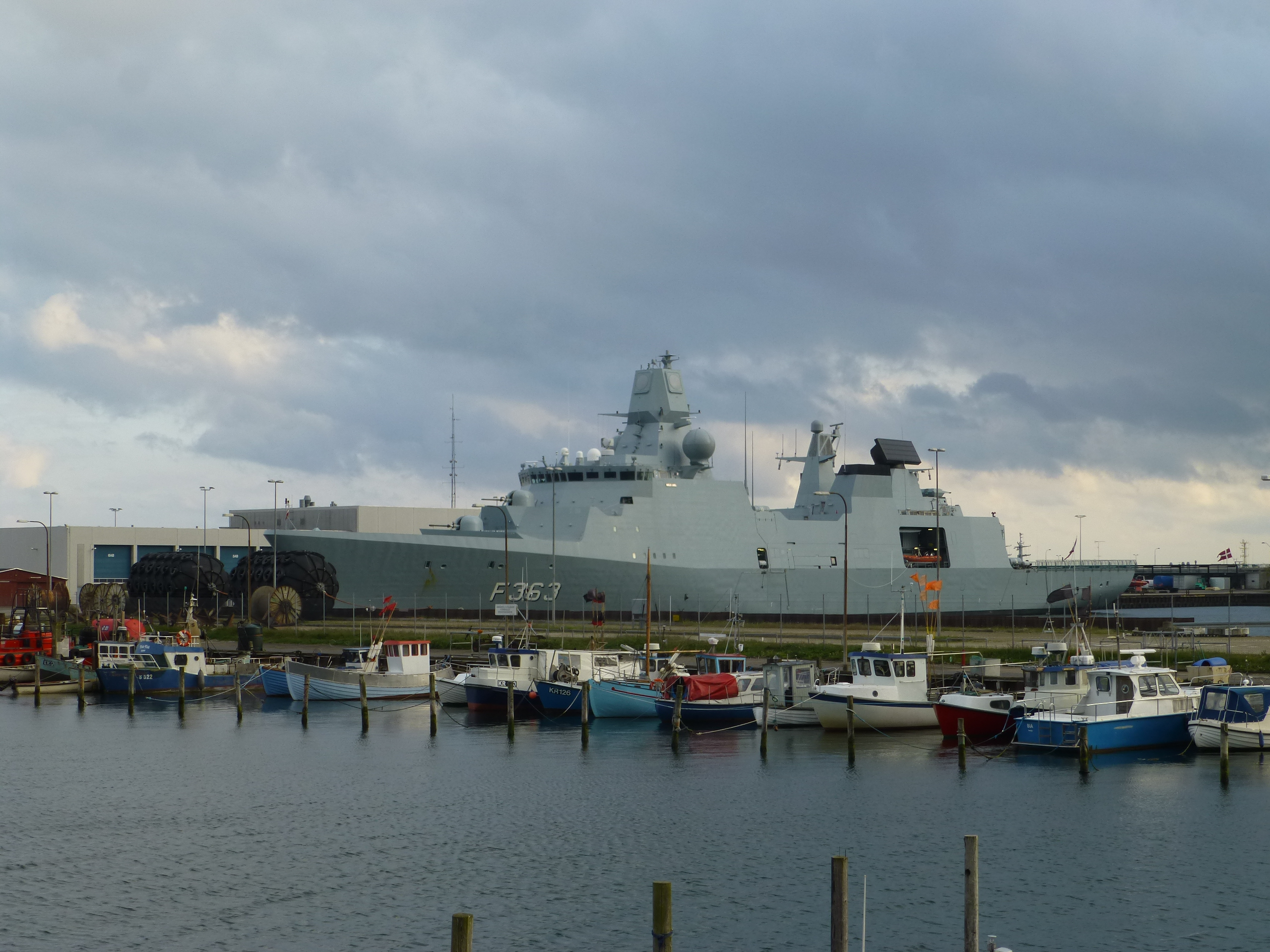
HDMS Niels Juel at Korsør on 16 May 2015.

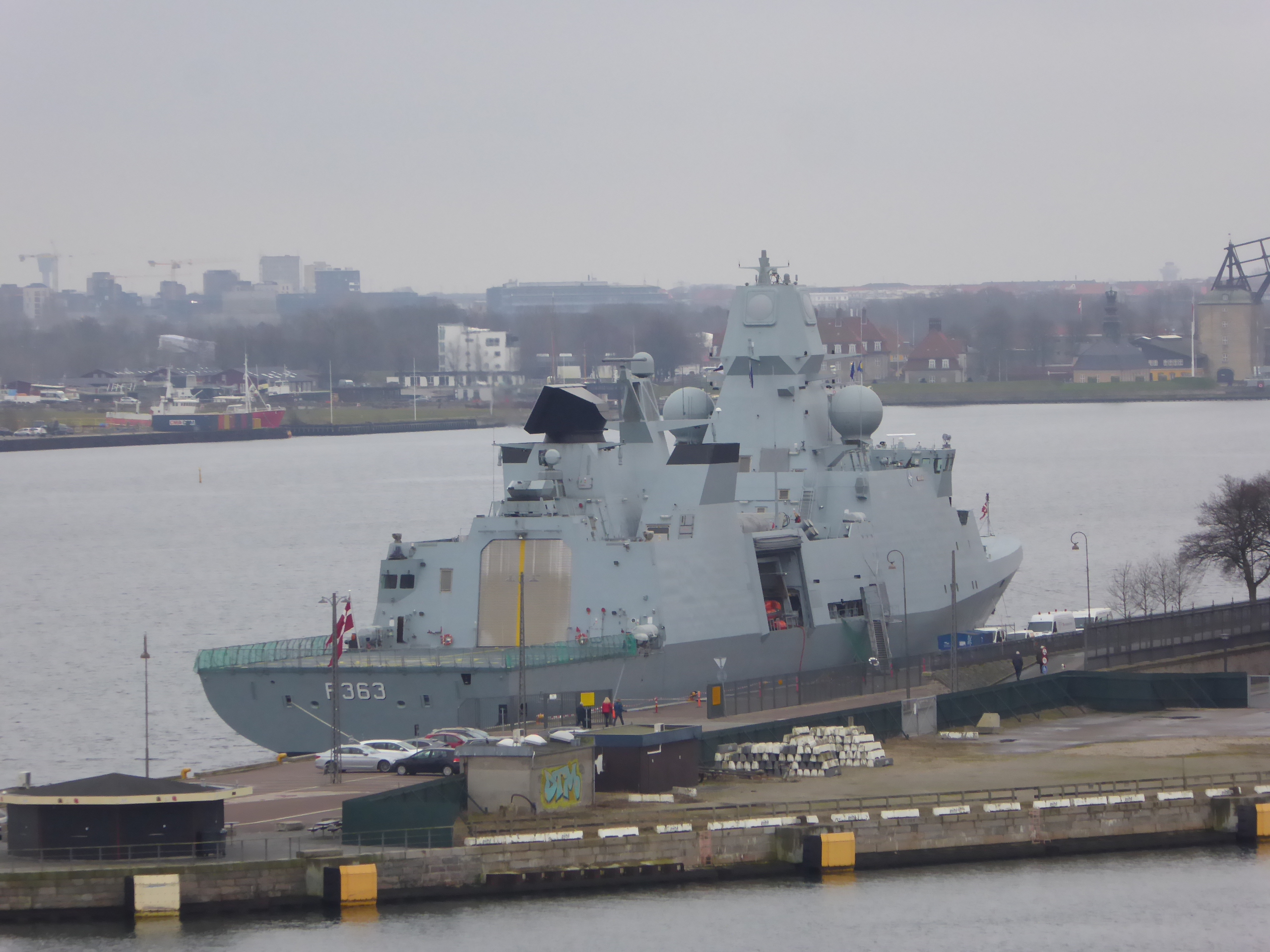
HDMS Niels Juel at Langeliniekaj on 20 January 2018.

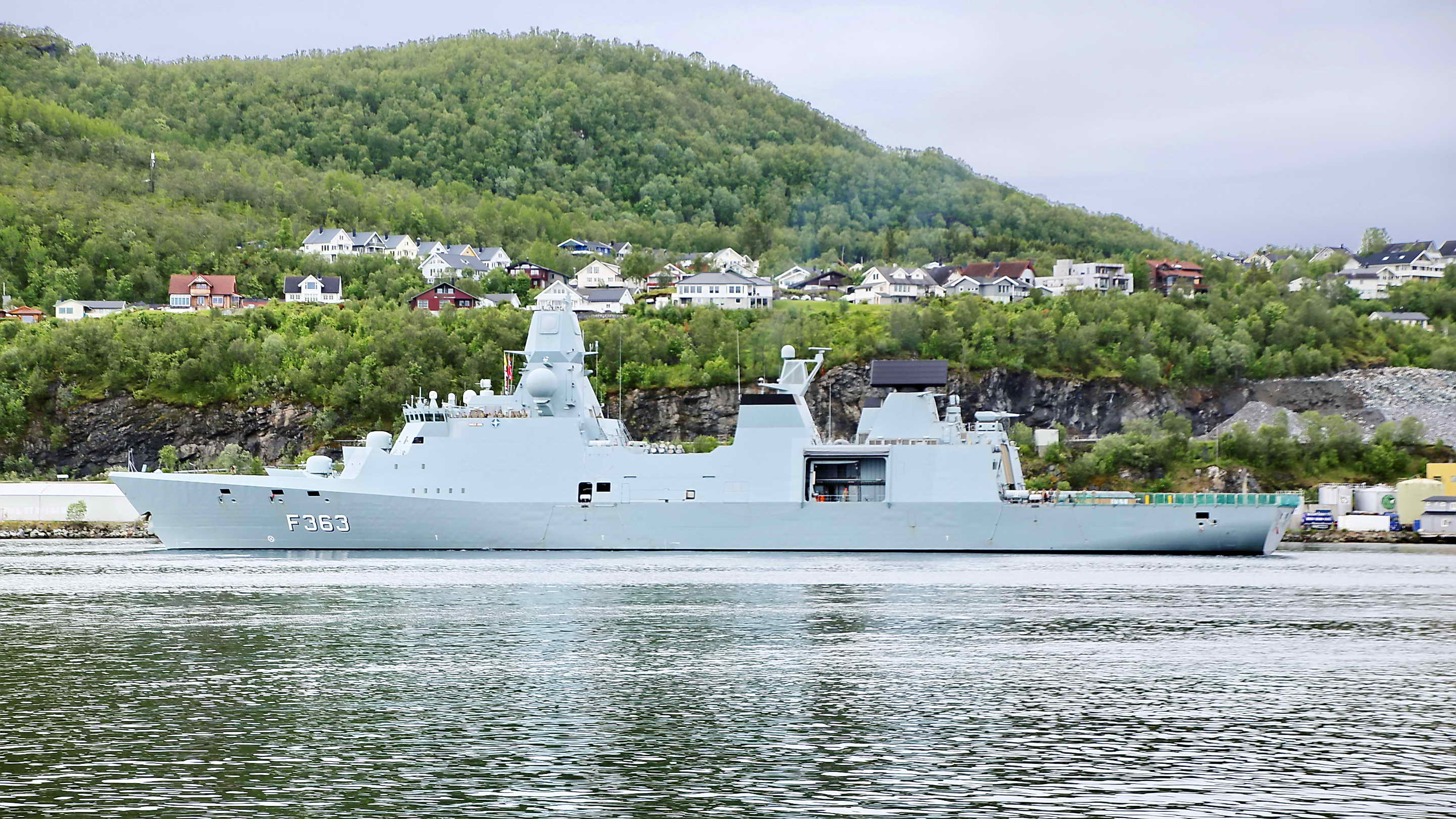
HDMS Niels Juel at Harstad on 22 June 2018.

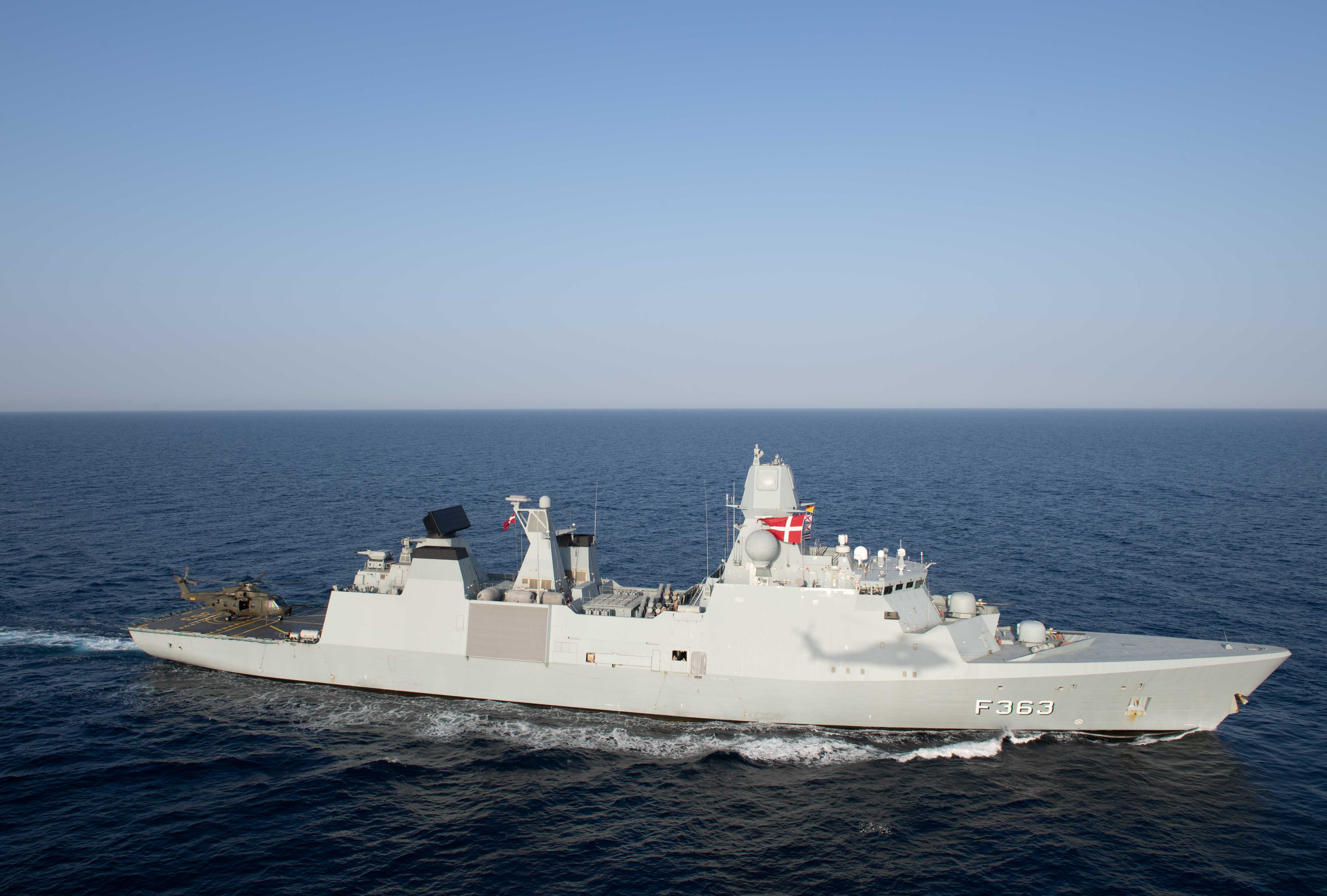
HDMS Niels Juel underway in Red Sea on 15 April 2019

== See also ==
- HDMS Iver Huitfeldt (F361)
- HDMS Peter Willemoes (F362)
