= HDMS Diana (1804) =

Royal Danish naval vessel

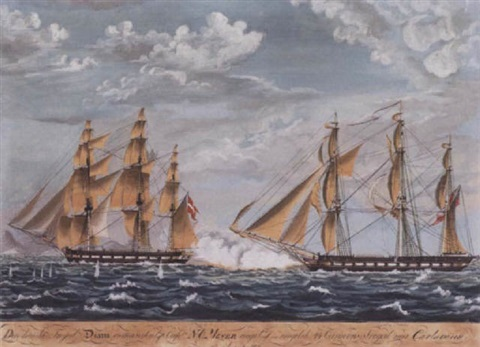
- HDMS Diana under command of Captain N. C. Meyer being chased by a British 44-gun frigate near Cartagena

History

Denmark
- Name: HDMS Diana
- Builder: Andreas Bodenhoff, Copenhagen
- Fate: Captured by Spain on 26 September 1809

Spain
- Name: Diana
- Acquired: 26 September 1809

General characteristics
- Type: Frigate

HDMS Diana was a frigate of the Royal Danish Navy. She was seized by Spain on 26 September 1809.

== History ==
She was launched from Andreas Bodenhoff's dockyards in Copenhagen in 1804. In early summer 1807, it was decided that HDMS Diana was to replace the frigate HDMS Fylla in the Danish West Indies. Captain lieutenant Christian Nicolai Meyer was selected as commander of the ship which was to call at Algiers on the way to deliver an offer to the Dey.

Diana set sail from Copenhagen on 7 July, called at Málaga on 1 September and arrived at Algiers on 7 September. After setting sail from Algiers, a British frigate informed the Danish ship about the war and fall of the Danish capital in the Battle of Copenhagen. Diana later called at Cartagena. In May 1808, Spain rose against Napoleon, Denmark's ally. In July 1809, Spain formed an alliance with Great Britain. Spain then declared war on Denmark, Diana was seized on 26 September 1809 and the crew was taken as prisoners of war.

In November 1810, Diana set sail for South America under the Spanish flag. 40 members of the crew ended up in an English prison. Meyer and a few other crew members were not allowed to leave Gibraltar until 1811. When he arrived at the Thames, he was surprised to learn that the 34 surviving crew members were still imprisoned. He managed to arrange for their release and the remaining members of Diana finally reached Copenhagen around 1 September 1812.

== See also ==
- HDMS Havfruen (1825)
