= Iver Huitfeldt-class frigate =

Air defence frigates of the Danish Navy

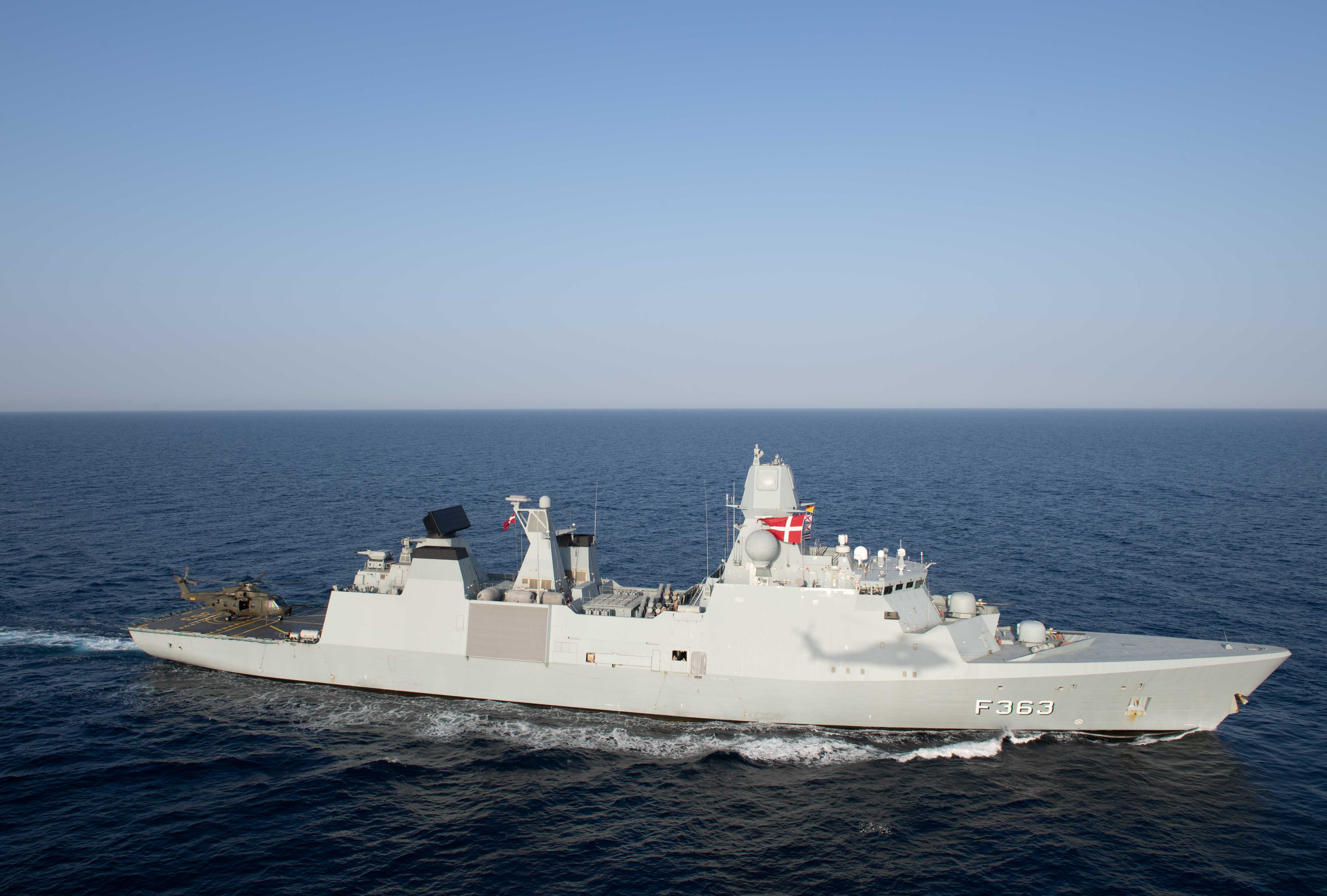
- HDMS Niels Juel underway in the Red Sea, April 2019

Class overview
- Builders: Odense Staalskibsværft; Baltija Shipbuilding Yard; Loksa Shipyard
- Operators: Royal Danish Navy
- Preceded by: Niels Juel-class corvette
- Cost: US$325 million per ship
- Built: 2008–2011
- In commission: 2012–present
- Planned: 3
- Completed: 3

General characteristics
- Type: Air defence frigate
- Displacement: 6,645 t (6,540 long tons) (full load)
- Length: 138.7 m (455 ft 1 in)
- Beam: 19.75 m (64 ft 10 in)
- Draft: 5.3 m (17 ft 5 in)
- Propulsion: Four MTU 8000 20V M70 diesel engines, 8.2 MW each; Two shafts, CODAD
- Speed: 28 knots (52 km/h; 32 mph)
- Range: 9,000 nmi (17,000 km; 10,000 mi) at 18 knots (33 km/h; 21 mph)
- Complement: 165
- Sensors & processing systems: Radars: Thales Nederland SMART-L long-range air and surface surveillance radar; Thales Nederland APAR air and surface search, tracking and guidance radar (I band); 2 × Saab CEROS 200 fire control radars; Terma SCANTER 6000 surveillance and helicopter guidance radar; Sonars: Atlas ASO 94 hull mounted sonar
- Electronic warfare & decoys: EW systems: 8 × 6-barrelled Terma Mk 137 130 mm decoy launchers; ES-3701 Tactical Radar Electronic Support Measures (ESM); Seagnat Mark 36 SRBOC; MASS after upgrade
- Armament: Permanently mounted weapons: 1 × OTO Melara 76 mm; 1 × Oerlikon Millennium 35 mm Naval Revolver Gun System CIWS; 2 × dual MU90 Impact ASW torpedo launchers; 32-cell Mark 41 Vertical Launching System for up to 32 SM-2 IIIA surface-to-air missiles; 6 StanFlex modules, with the following options each: 1 × OTO Melara 76 mm, usually mounted in bow slot; 1 × Mk.56 VLS fitting 12 RIM-162 ESSM (usually mounts 2); 8 × Harpoon Block II SSM in inclined launchers (usually mounts 2)
- Aircraft carried: 1 × MH-60R
- Aviation facilities: Aft helicopter deck and hangar

The Iver Huitfeldt class is a three-ship class of air defence frigates that entered service with the Royal Danish Navy in 2012 and 2013.

== Description ==
The class is built on the experience gained from the Absalon-class frigates. By reusing the basic hull design of the Absalon class, the Royal Danish Navy has been able to construct the Iver Huitfeldt class considerably cheaper than comparable ships.

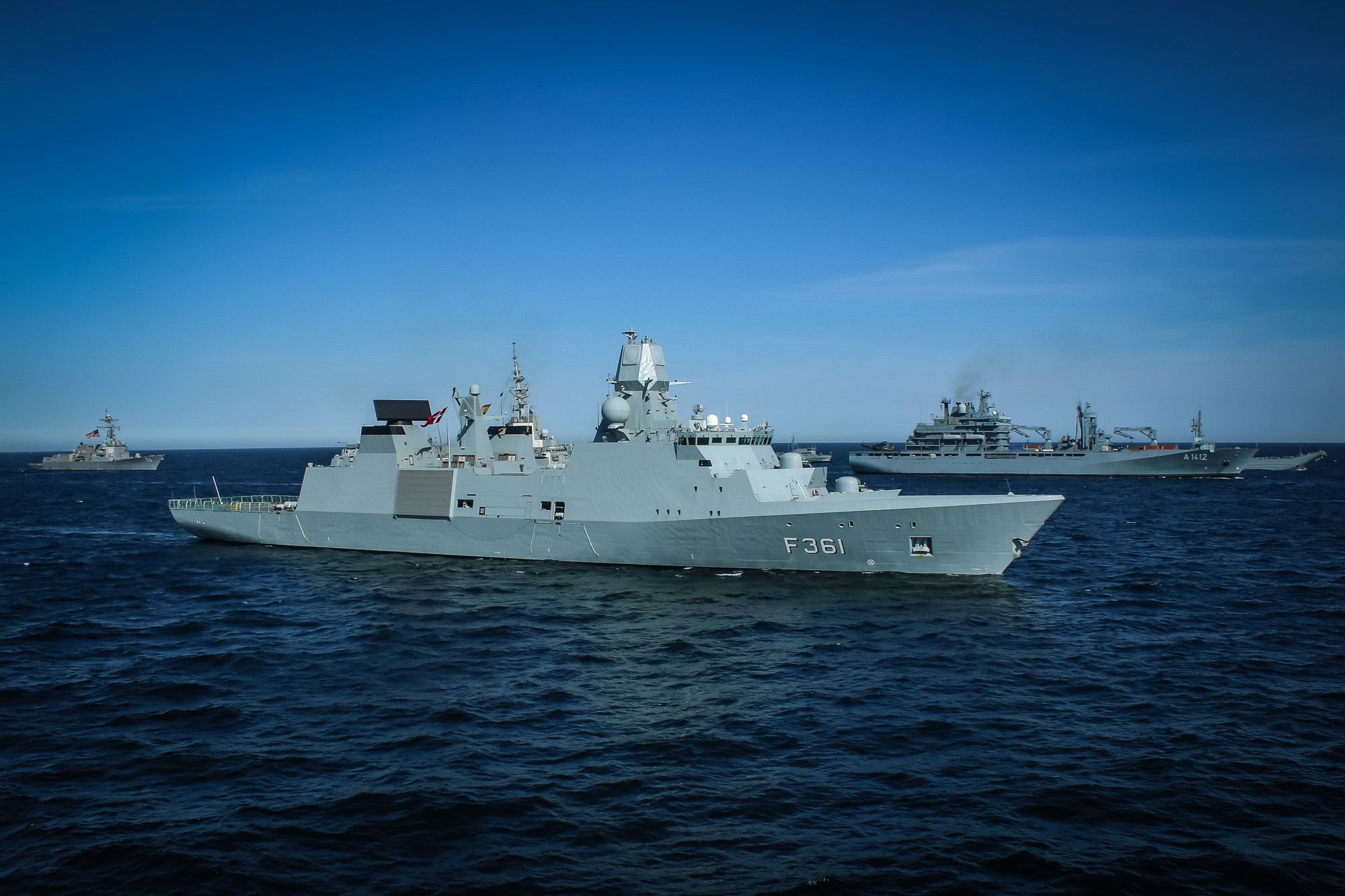
HDMS Iver Huitfeldt underway, June 2018

== Design ==
The frigates are compatible with the Royal Danish Navy's StanFlex modular mission payload system used in the Absalons, and they are designed with slots for six modules, four of which on the missile deck. These positions usually accommodate the Mark 141 8-cell Harpoon launcher module, or the 12-cell Mark 56 Evolved SeaSparrow Missile (ESSM) Vertical Launching System (VLS), in addition to a fixed 32-cell Mark 41 vertical launching system replacing the 5th module located there on the Absalons.

The Absalon-class ships are primarily designed for command, support, and ASW roles, with a large ro-ro deck. The three newer Iver Huitfeldt-class frigates are equipped for an air defence role with Standard Missiles, as well as the potential to use Tomahawk cruise missiles, a first for the Royal Danish Navy.

The ships were constructed in blocks in Estonia and Lithuania to control costs. These blocks were then towed to the Odense Steel Shipyard where they were assembled. The ships are built to DNV standards.

=== Anti-air warfare ===
Most of the weapons for the three ships were reused from the previous Niels Juel-class corvettes and the Flyvefisken-class patrol vessels. Other components were reused to keep the cost at a minimum.

These ships share their anti-air warfare suite with the Royal Netherlands Navy's De Zeven Provinciën-class frigates and the German Navy's Sachsen-class frigates. The sensors of this suite include the long range surveillance radar SMART-L (passive electronically scanned array) and the multi-function radar APAR active electronically scanned array.

The SMART-L and APAR are highly complementary in the sense that SMART-L is an L band radar, providing very long range surveillance. APAR is an I band radar, providing precise target tracking, a highly capable horizon search capability, and missile guidance using the Interrupted Continuous Wave Illumination (ICWI) technique, allowing guidance of 32 semi-active radar homing missiles in flight simultaneously, including 16 in the terminal guidance phase.

The primary anti-air weapons are the medium-range ESSM and the area defence SM-2 IIIA. The Mk 41 VLS is used to house and launch these missiles. Depending on the number of Harpoon launchers installed, up to 24 ESSMs and 32 SM-2 IIIAs or SM-6s may be carried.

In 2025, the Royal Danish Navy began replacing its Harpoon missile systems on Iver Huitfeldt-class frigates with Naval Strike Missiles (NSM), through a 2.1 billion NOK deal with Norway's Kongsberg Defence & Aerospace. The upgrade aims to enhance Denmark's long-range strike capabilities and aligns its systems with NATO standards.

== Operational history ==
On the 9th of March, 2024, the title-bearer of the class, Ivar Huitfeld, suffered several weapon guidance and ordnance errors when taking part in a US-led operation to protect commercial shipping in the Red Sea. During an attempt to launch Evolved Sea Sparrow missiles against drone targets, the APAR radar locked and prevented use of the missiles. When the OTO Melara gun had to be used instead, the shells suffered untimely detonations. Despite these errors, the ship successfully destroyed all targets.

On the 27th of March, 2025, on account of the significant issues experienced with the combat management system and the APAR radar, as well the significant cost associated with a Mid Life Update, the entire class of ships were reportedly considered for a downgrade and role-change, leaving space for a new class of air defense frigates. If effectuated, this would see the class of ships in a smaller Baltic Sea patrol role instead.

== List of ships ==
Name	Number	Laid Down	Launched	Commissioned	Status	Badge
Iver Huitfeldt	F361	June 2008	March 2010	January 2011	In service	
Peter Willemoes	F362	March 2009	December 2010	June 2011	In service	
Niels Juel	F363	December 2009	December 2010	November 2011	In service	

== Export bids ==
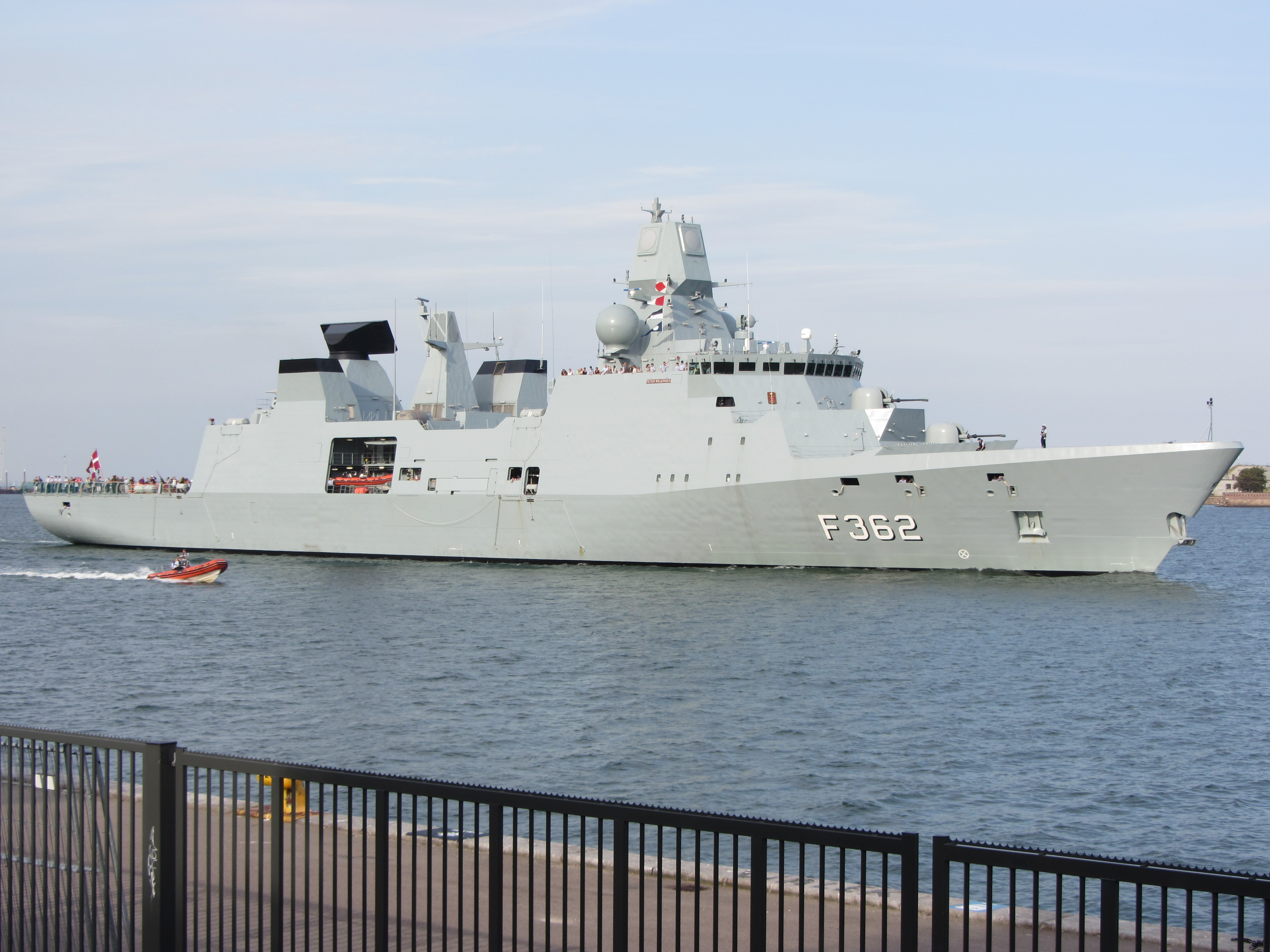
HDMS Peter Willemoes entering Copenhagen, August 2012

=== Australia ===
The builder's successor, OMT, suggested the type for the Procurement programme of the Royal Australian Navy's frigates, but built in Australia and modified for anti-submarine warfare. They were suggested for the Royal New Zealand Navy, as they currently operate modified Anzac-class frigates similar to those of the Royal Australian Navy. However, OMT was not among the three warship designers shortlisted by Australia for the SEA 5000 frigate program in April 2016.

=== Canada ===
The Iver Huitfeldt-class frigate was a contender in the Canadian Single Class Surface Combatant Project. It has been claimed that due to concerns over the fairness of the bidding process, two European shipbuilders, possibly Germany's ThyssenKrupp Marine Systems and Odense Maritime Technology, declined to submit bids.

=== United Kingdom ===
In late May 2018 a consortium of Babcock International, BMT Group and Thales Group announced the "Arrowhead 140" design, based on the hull of the Iver Huitfeldt-class frigates, for the Royal Navy Type 31e frigate programme. In September 2019, it was announced that the Arrowhead 140 design had been selected for the Type 31 frigate.

=== Indonesia ===
In March 2019, a variant of Denmark's Iver Huitfeldt class emerged as a front-runner for the Indonesian Navy's US$720 million two-frigate acquisition programme. The Indonesian Navy expected to purchase two Iver Huitfeldt-class frigates, with a budget plan of US$720 million for its MEF Phase 3 in 2020–2024. Indonesian officials and Ministry of Defense officials held multiple meetings about the ships. By 14 March 2019 there was discussion between the Indonesian Ministry of Defense and Odense Maritime Technology about the technical issues and potential cooperation. Denmark offered a scheme of "transfer of technology" (ToT) to Indonesia, such as modular frigate building designed by BUMN PT PAL.

In February 2020, a defense delegation from Indonesia visited Denmark, and toured Niels Juel. According to Indonesian media, the deputy of the Indonesian Ministry of Defense Sakti Wahyu Trenggono said in March that Indonesia's PT PAL was tasked to develop a design for two ships over five years, for Rp1.1 trillion (or US$720 million) in collaboration with Denmark, for the Indonesian Navy. In April 2020, representatives from the Indonesian Ministry of Defense, PT PAL shipbuilders and PT Sinar Kokoh Persada, an Indonesian agent for the Danish Odense Maritime Technology (OMT) company, agreed to an opening contract for the procurement of the Danish frigate. Points in the contract include workshare arrangements that will be made after the effective (actual) contract can be realized.

In September 2021, Indonesia signed a contract with Babcock for the purchase of the Type 31 frigate design license, which based on the Iver Huitfeldt design, in order to construct 2 frigates locally in Indonesia.

== See also ==
- List of active Royal Danish Navy ships
- List of frigate classes in service

Equivalent frigates of the same era

- De Zeven Provinciën class
- Project 22350
- Shivalik class
- FREMM
- Sachsen class
- Type 054A
- Álvaro de Bazán class
