= HDMS Freja (P521) =

Danish Navy vessel

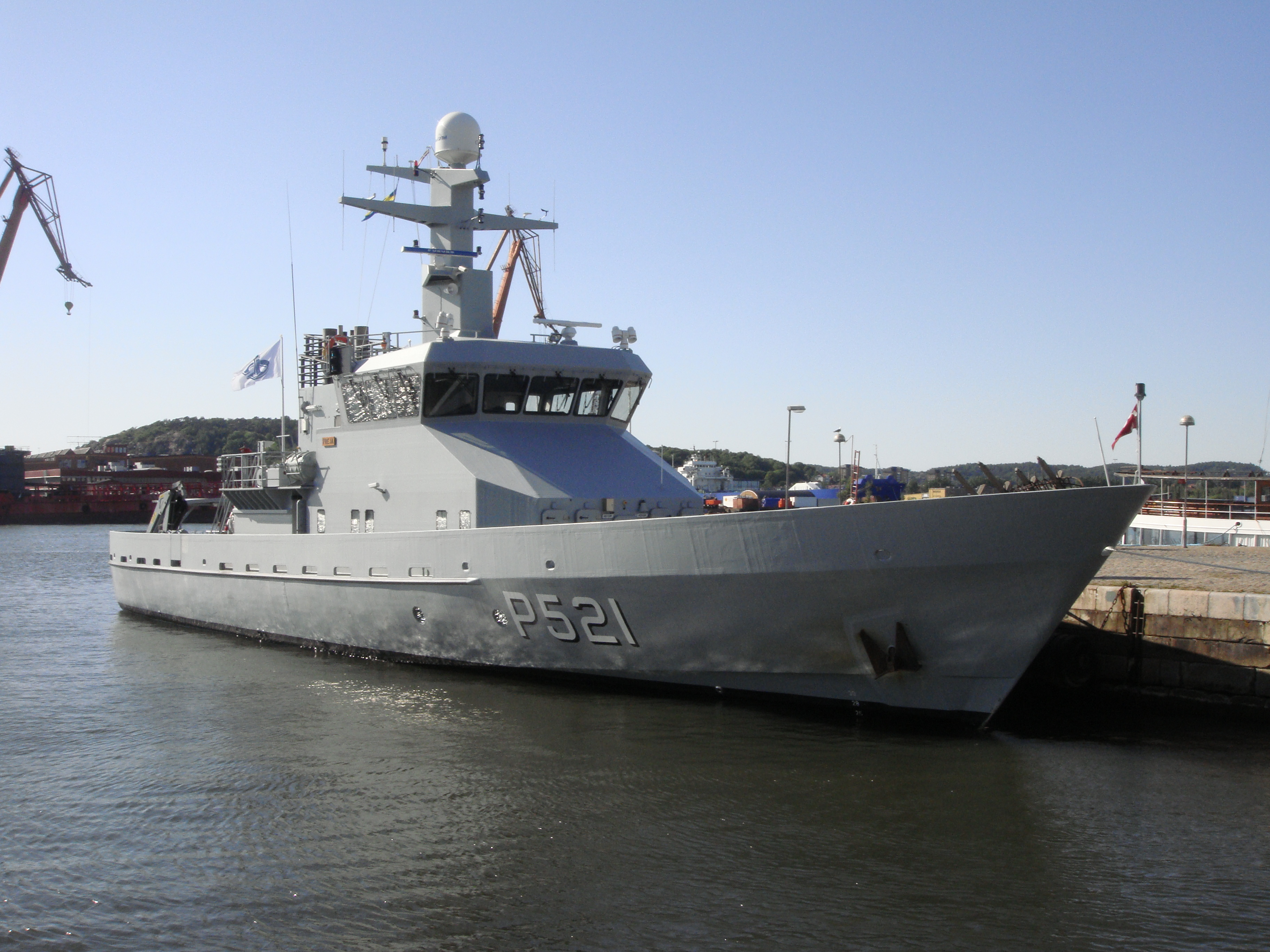
- HDMS Freja in Gothenburg, Sweden . June 2009

History

Denmark
- Name: Freja
- Builder: Faaborg Værft A/S
- Launched: 29 August 2006
- Commissioned: 30 May 2008
- Identification: MMSI number: 220432000; Callsign: OVFB
- Status: in active service
- Badge

General characteristics
- Class & type: Diana-class patrol vessel
- Type: Large patrol craft
- Displacement: 246 tons
- Length: 43.0 m (141 ft 1 in)
- Beam: 8.2 m (26 ft 11 in)
- Depth: 2.0 m (6 ft 7 in)
- Propulsion: 2x MTU 396 16V TB94 Diesel Engine @ 2.100 kW v/ 1.976 RPM with 2x Propellers
- Speed: 25 knots (46 km/h; 29 mph)
- Range: 1,000 nautical miles (1,900 km; 1,200 mi) at 15 knots (28 km/h; 17 mph)
- Boats & landing craft carried: 1 RHIB
- Complement: 9 (accommodation for up to 15 in total)
- Sensors & processing systems: 2x Furono navigation RADAR
- Armament: 2x 12.7 mm Heavy Machine Gun M/01 LvSa M2 Browning
- Notes: International Call Sign OVFB

HDMS Freja is a Diana-class large ocean patrol vessel belonging to the Royal Danish Navy.

Freja is the second patrol vessel in the Diana class and is built to patrol in the Danish territorial waters. It is designed by Hauschildt Marine in cooperation with Danish Defense Acquisition and Logistics Organization and Faaborg Værft A/S. The ship is named after the Norse fertility goddess Freya. Freja is, like all its sister ships, built in Faaborg yard. The ship was named at a ceremony at Naval Base Korsør by General Jesper Helsø, Defense Chief.

Freja is the fifth ship to bear the name in Danish service:

- Freya (frigate, 1795-1807)
- Freya (frigate, 1824-1853)
- Freya (paddle steamer, 1864-1864)
- A541 Freja (surveying ship, 1939-1967)
- P521 Freja (patrol vessel, 2008 - till date)

== Functions ==
The main task performed by Freja are:

- Surveillance
- Maintaining of sovereignty
- Search and Rescue
- Diving sickness management
- Environmental protection
- Assistance to the Police
- Explosive Ordnance Disposal

== Sources ==
- Freja Specs in Naval History
- HDMS Freja Specs in Danish Naval Site
- Freja in Danish Wikipedia
- Info of the ship
- Freja Info
