= HDMS Peter Willemoes (F362) =

Iver Huitfeldt-class frigate

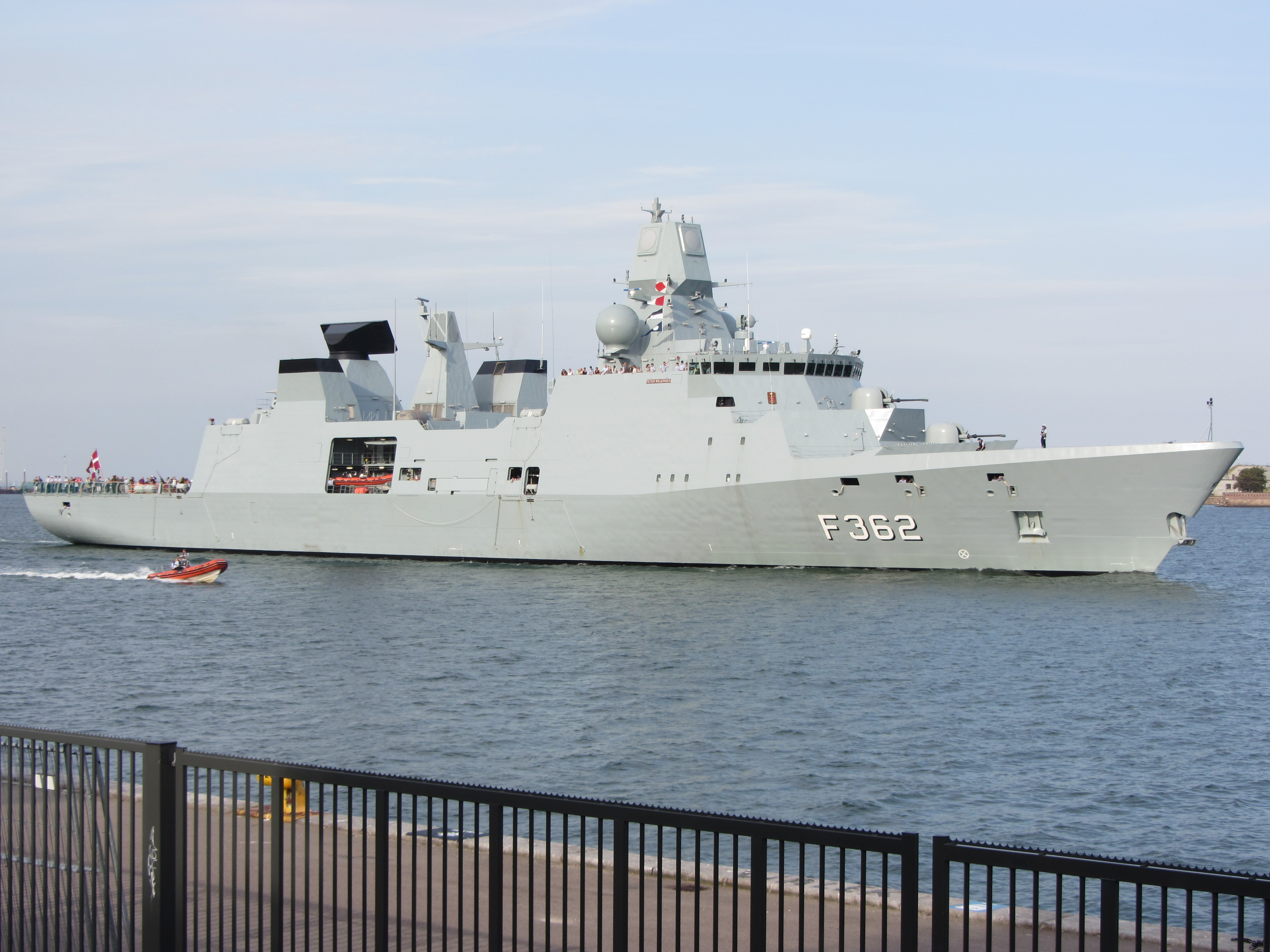
- HDMS Peter Willemoes entering Copenhagen on 18 August 2012

History

Denmark
- Name: Peter Willemoes
- Namesake: Peter Willemoes
- Builder: Odense Steel Shipyard, Odense
- Laid down: 12 March 2009
- Launched: 21 December 2010
- Commissioned: 21 June 2011
- Home port: Korsør
- Identification: MMSI number: 219104000; Callsign: OVVB; Pennant number: F362
- Motto: Tapperhed ærer, Feighed vanærer!; (Bravery honors, Cowardice dishonors!)
- Status: Active
- Badge

General characteristics
- Notes: The three ship class have shared characteristics. Main article: Iver Huitfeldt-class frigate § Design

HDMS Peter Willemoes (F362) is a Iver Huitfeldt-class frigate in the Royal Danish Navy. The ship is named after Peter Willemoes, a 18-19th-century Danish officer.

== Design ==
The design is shared across the three ship class.

== Construction and service history ==
She was laid down on 12 March 2009 and launched on 21 December 2010 by Odense Steel Shipyard, Odense. Commissioned on 21 June 2011.

On 18 February 2017, she came alongside USS George H.W. Bush as the aircraft carrier was replenishing with USNS Supply.

Peter Willemoes transits the Gulf of Aden while on patrol on 24 April 2019.

In January 2026, Peter Willemoes deployed to the North Atlantic as part of Operation Arctic Endurance, providing air defence capability alongside the French frigate Bretagne and the Danish inspection vessel Thetis.

== Gallery ==
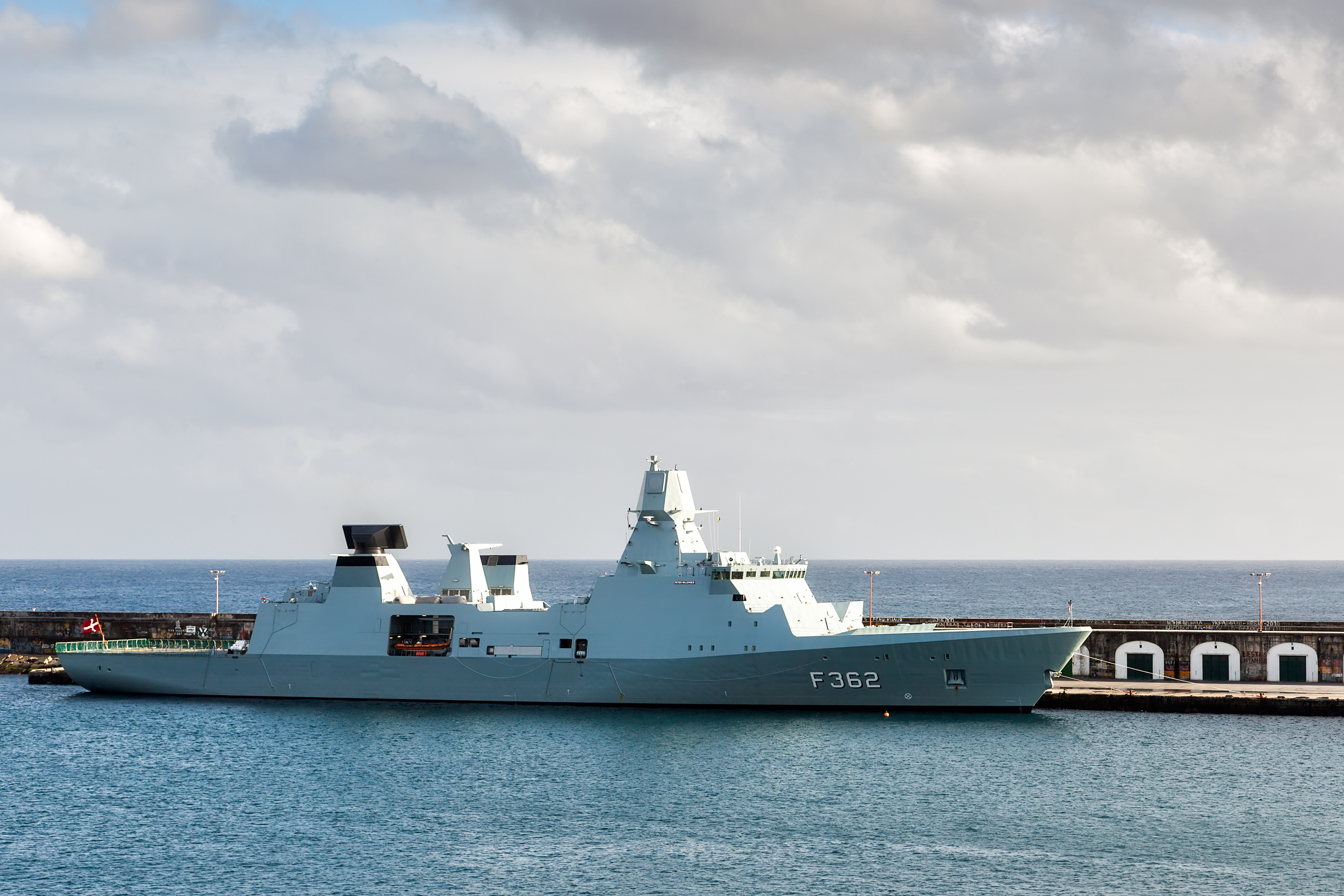
HDMS Peter Willemoes fitting out on 8 November 2011.

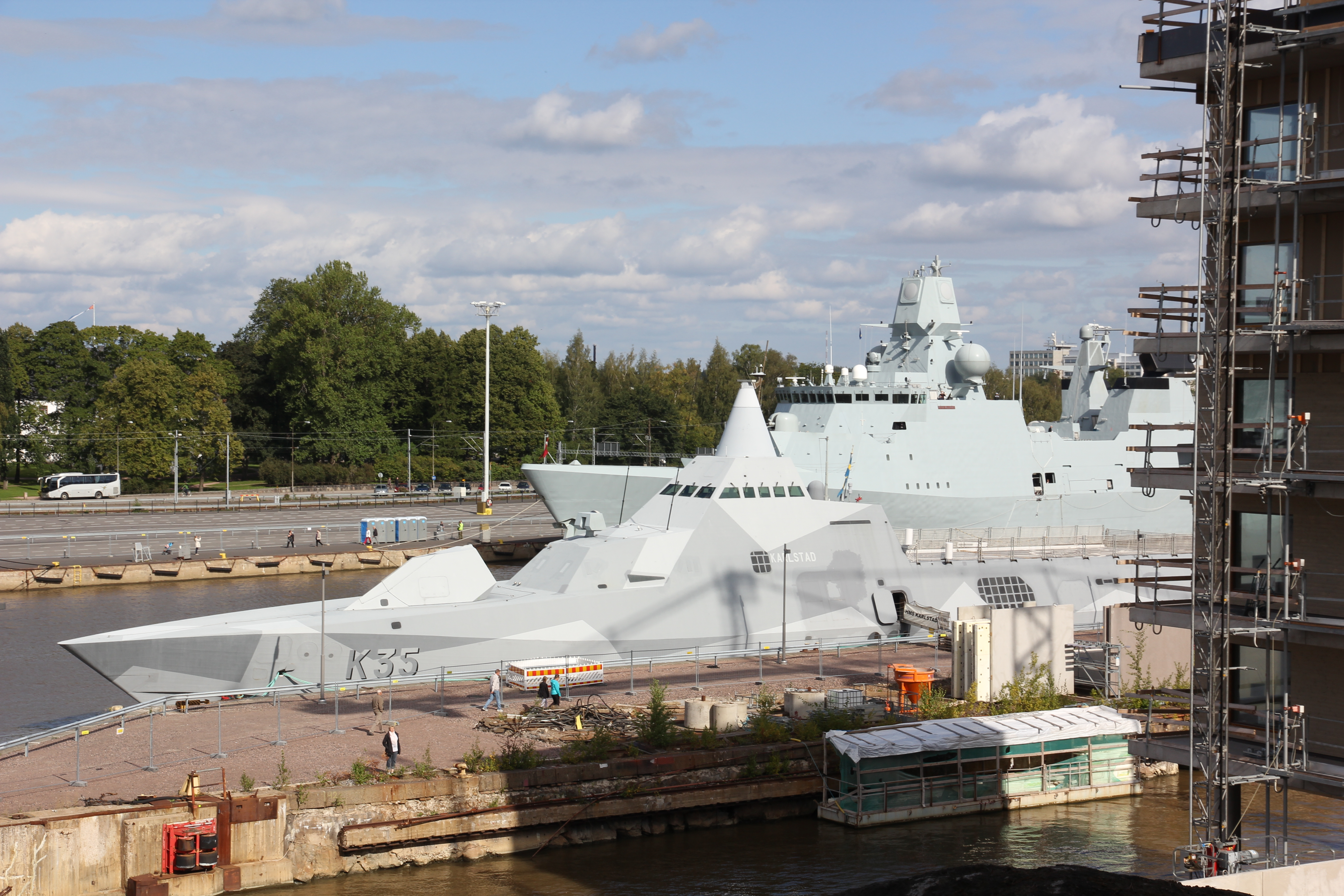
HSwMS Karlstad next to HDMS Peter Willemoes in 2014.

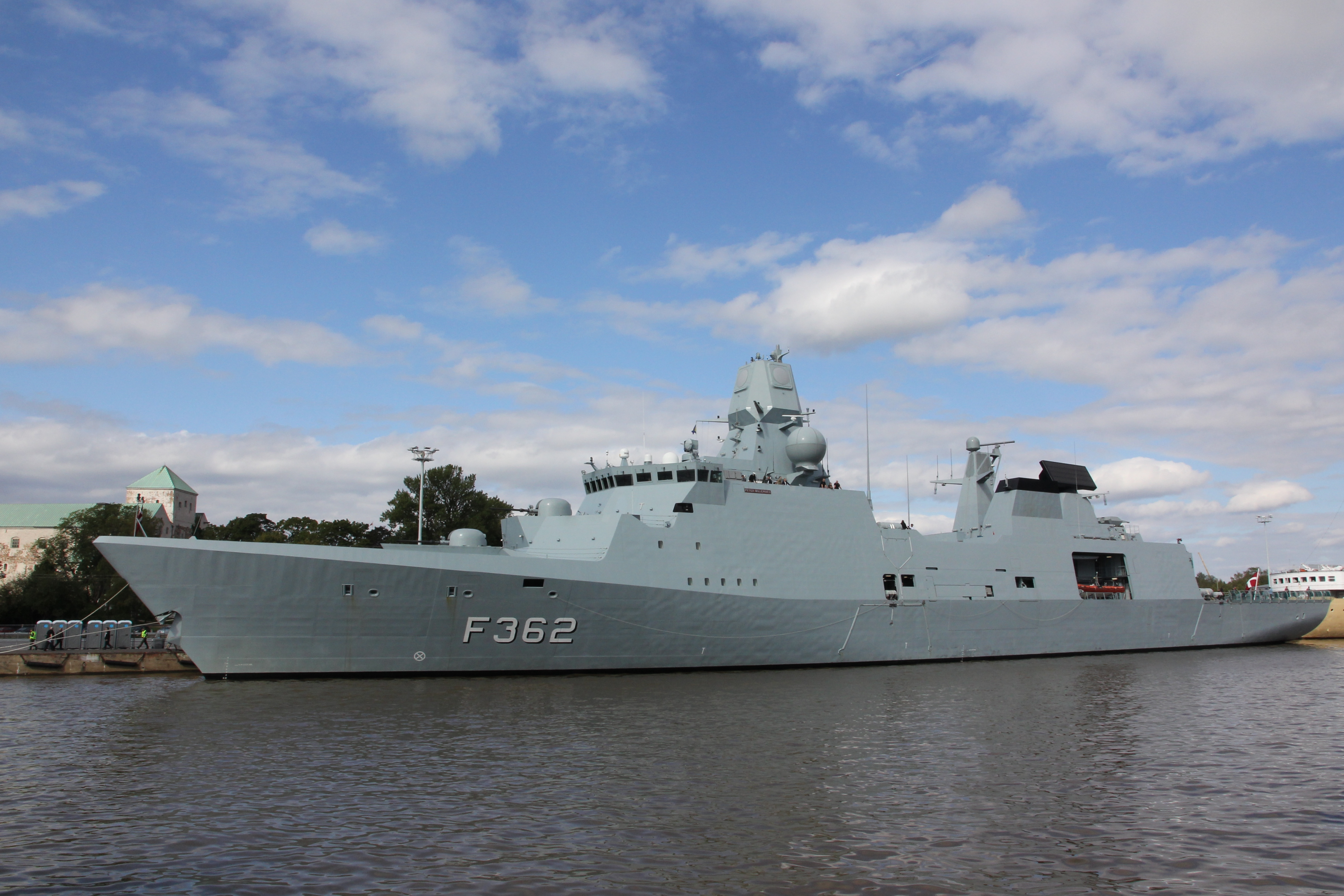
HDMS Peter Willemoes at Aura River on 31 August 2014.

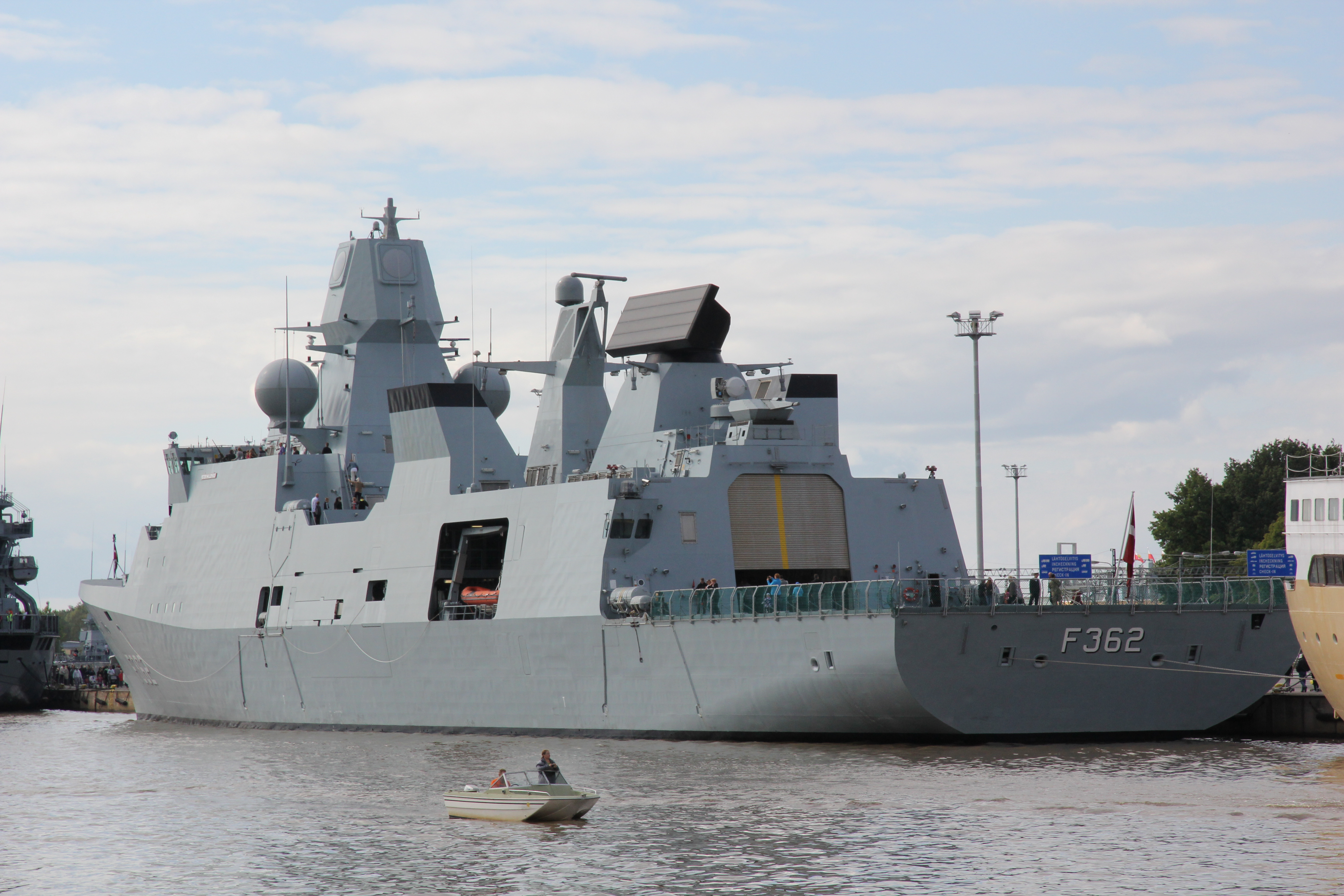
HDMS Peter Willemoes at Aura River on 31 August 2014.

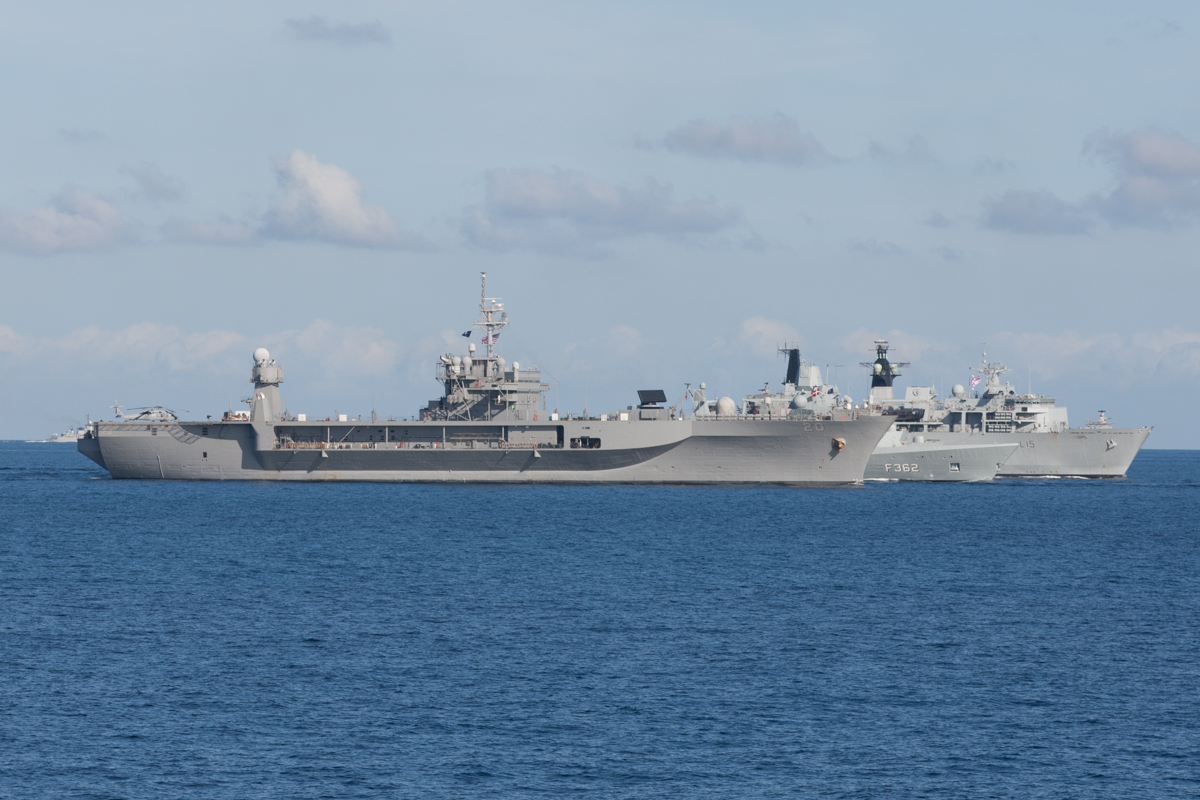
HDMS Peter Willemoes, USS Mount Whitney and HMS Bulwark underway on 29 October 2015.

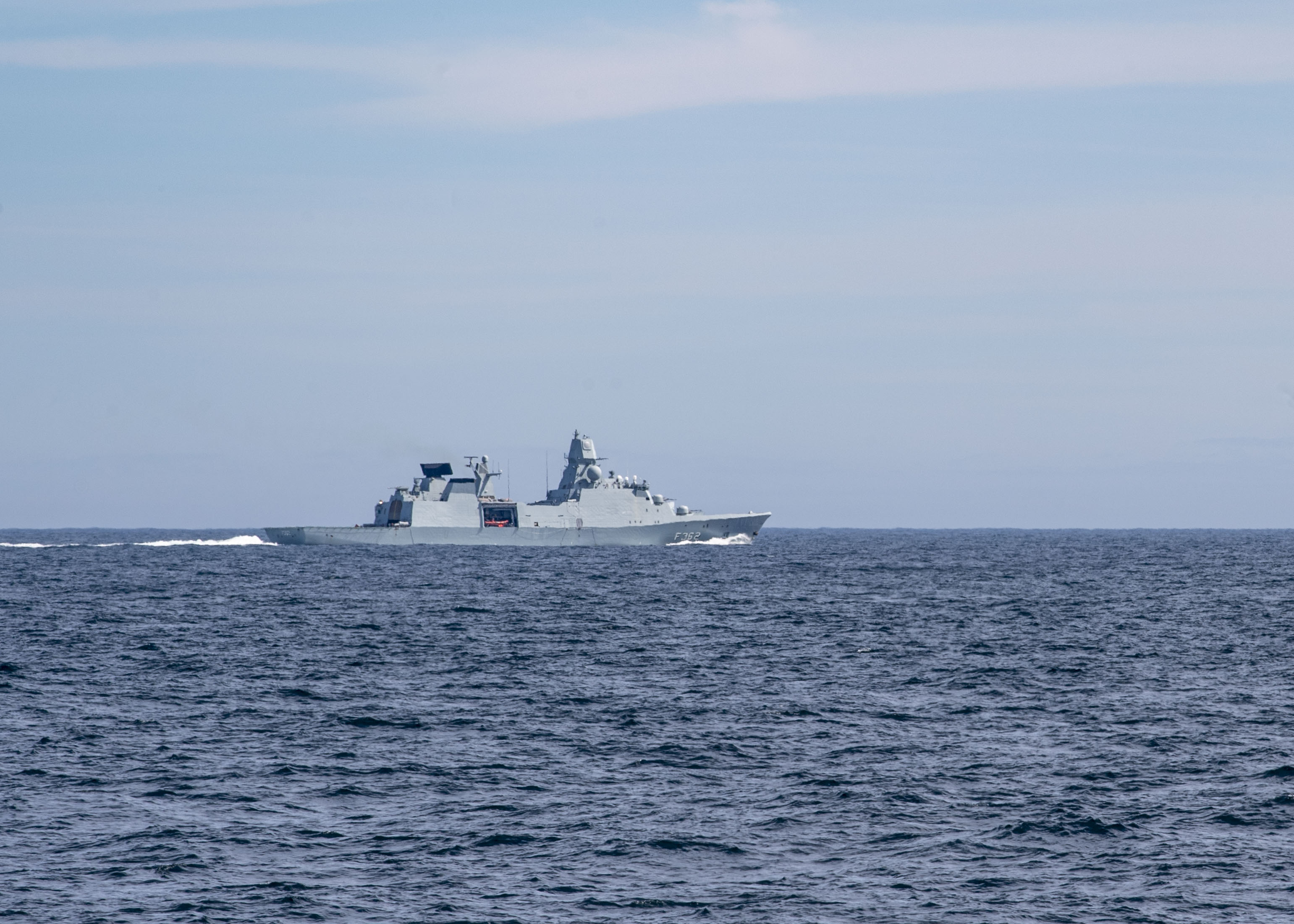
HDMS Peter Willemoes underway in the Atlantic Ocean on 16 September 2019.

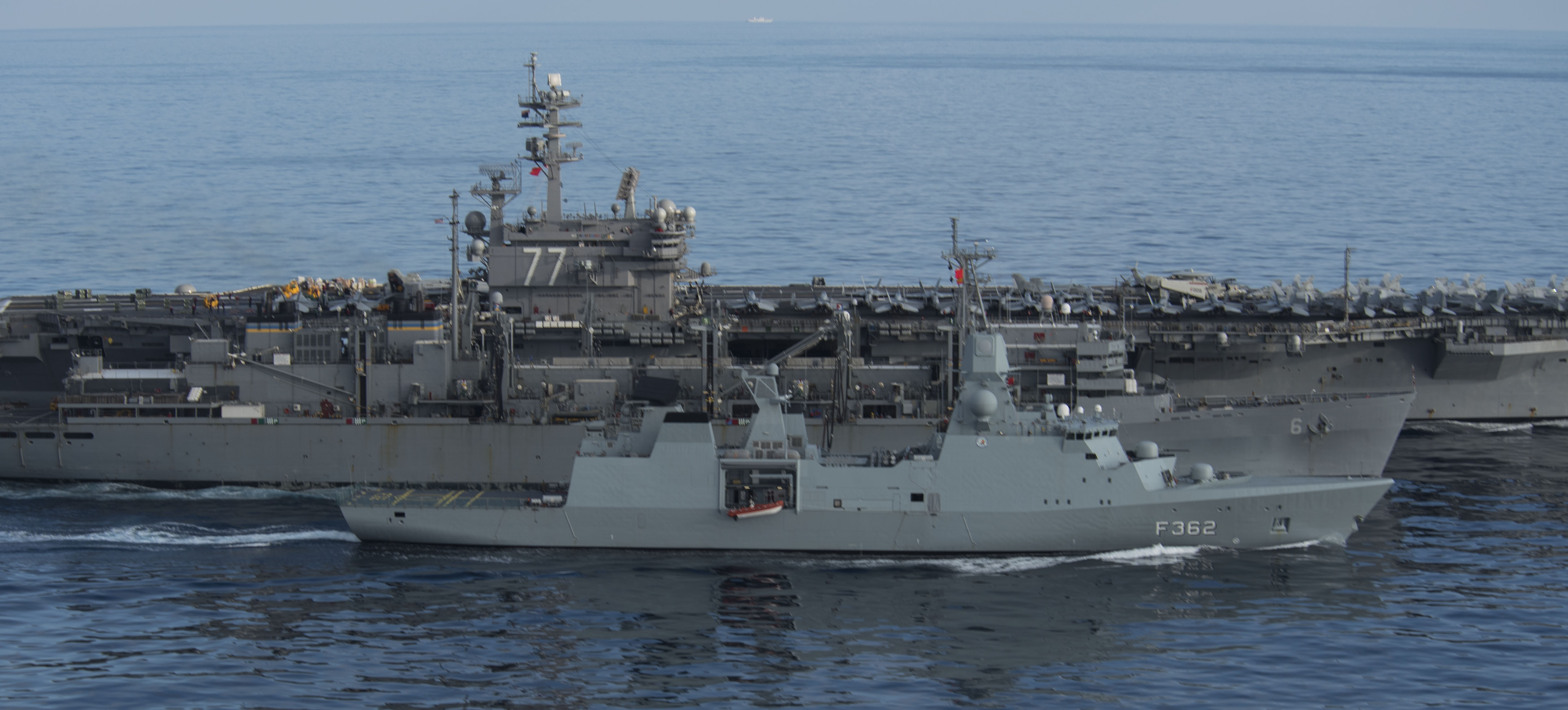
HDMS Peter Willemoes and USS George H.W. Bush underway on 16 September 2019.

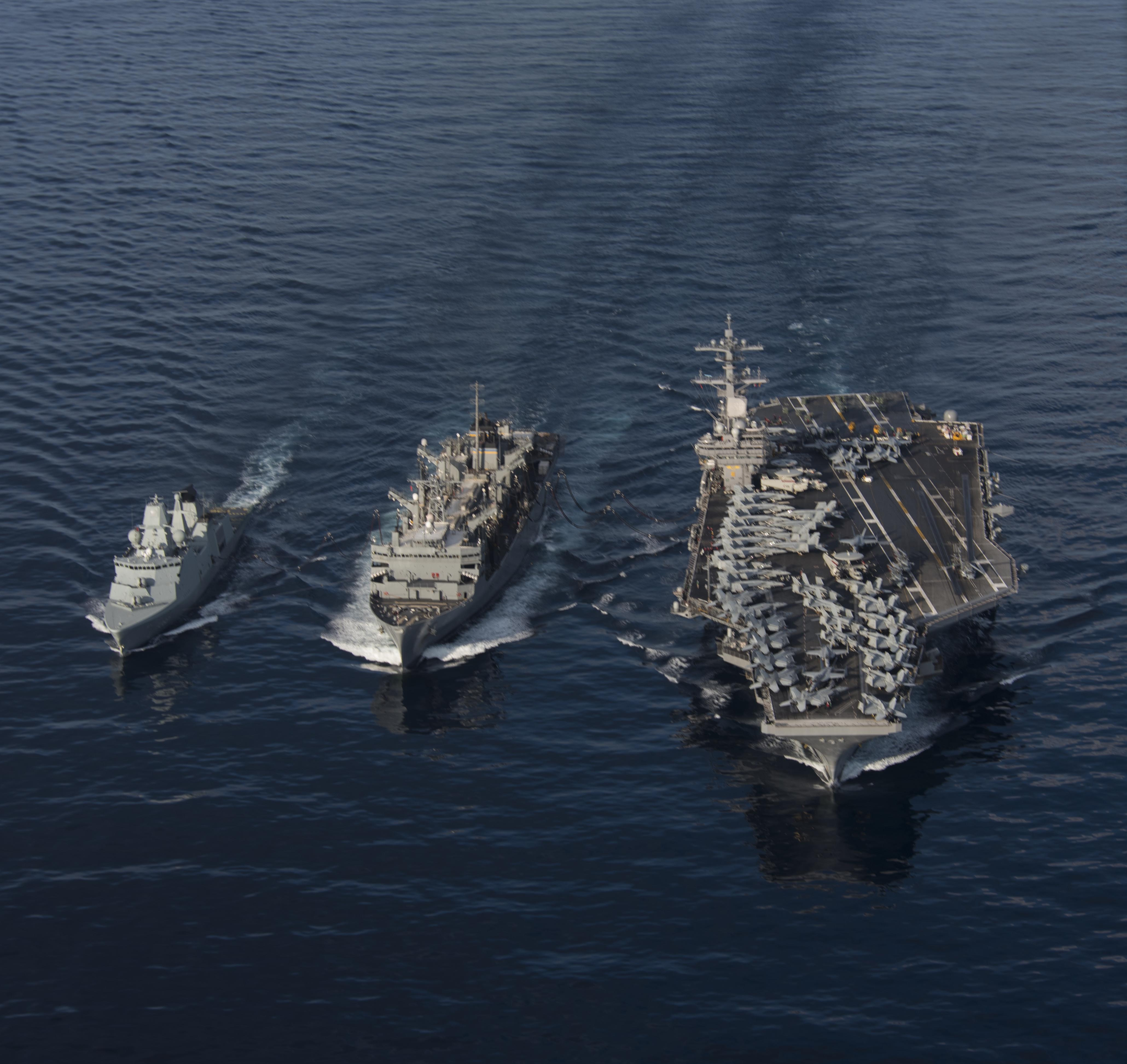
HDMS Peter Willemoes, USS George H.W. Bush and USNS Supply underway on 16 September 2019.

== See also ==
- HDMS Iver Huitfeldt (F361)
- HDMS Niels Juel (F363)
