= HDMS Birkholm =

Danish vessel

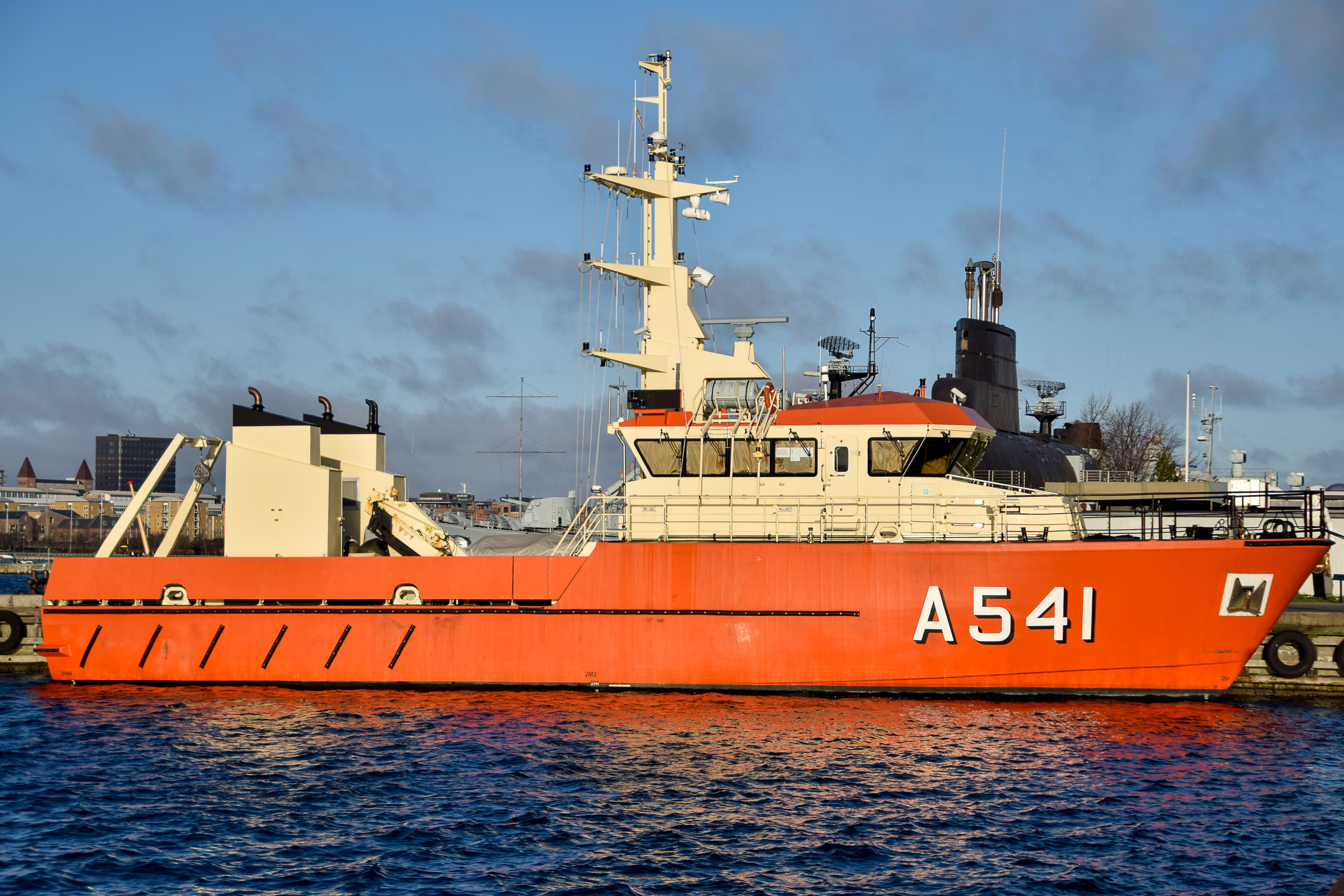
- The A541 Birkholm in Copenhagen in 2019

History

Denmark
- Name: Birkholm
- Launched: 10 December 2005
- Commissioned: 27 January 2006
- Identification: MMSI number: 219007678; Callsign: OUGO
- Status: in active service

General characteristics
- Class & type: Holm class multi-purpose vessel
- Displacement: 98 tonnes (96 long tons)
- Length: 28.9 m (94 ft 10 in)
- Beam: 6.3 m (20 ft 8 in)
- Draught: 1.74 m (5 ft 9 in)
- Propulsion: 2 × Scania DC-16 diesel engines, each 375 kW
- Speed: 13 knots (24 km/h)
- Range: 600 nmi (1,100 km)
- Complement: 3
- Armament: None
- Notes: Research and survey vessel

HDMS Birkholm (A541) is the first of six Holm-class Mk.I standard research vessels built for the Royal Danish Navy. She was launched on 10 December 2005 and commissioned on 27 January 2006. She is unarmed, carries a crew of 3 with facilities for 10 persons. The Holm-class can be used in a surveying, training or minesweeping role, with an open position aft which can hold various equipment such as a crane.
