= HDMS Diana (P520) =

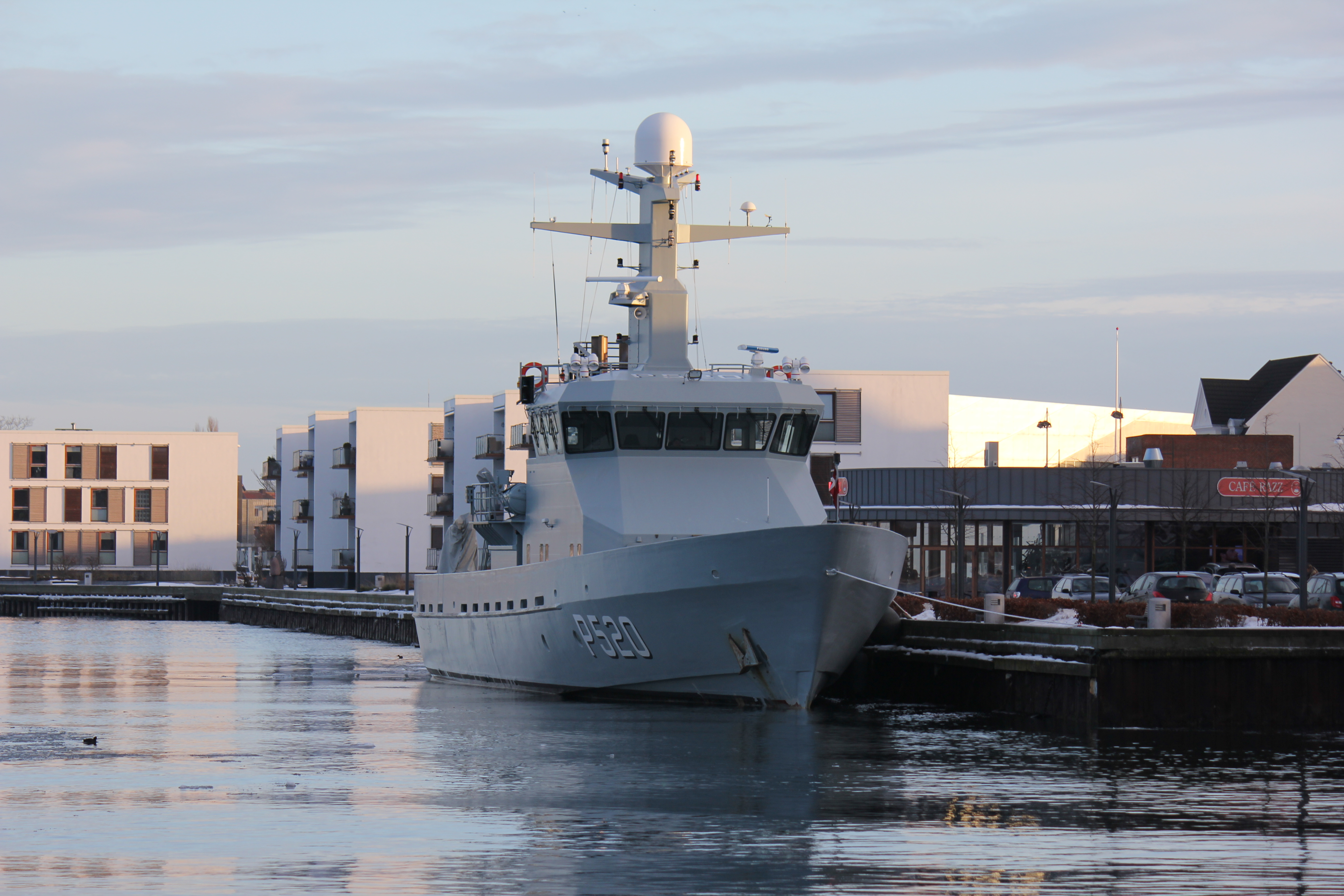
- HDMS Diana in Middelfart, Denmark. Jan 2011

History

Denmark
- Name: HDMS Diana
- Builder: Faaborg Værft A/S Karlskrona Varvet
- Laid down: 27 October 2005
- Launched: 27 March 2006
- Commissioned: 12 December 2007
- Identification: MMSI number: 220431000; Callsign: OVFA
- Status: in active service

General characteristics
- Class & type: Diana-class patrol vessel
- Type: Large Patrol Craft
- Displacement: 246 tons
- Length: 43.0 m (141 ft 1 in)
- Beam: 8.2 m (26 ft 11 in)
- Depth: 2.0 m (6 ft 7 in)
- Propulsion: 2x MTU 396 16V TB94 Diesel Engine @ 2.100 kW v/ 1.976 RPM with 2x Propellers
- Speed: 25 knots (46 km/h; 29 mph)
- Range: 1.000 nautical mile (1.852 km; 1.151 mi) at 15 knots (28 km/h; 17 mph)
- Boats & landing craft carried: 1 RHIB
- Complement: 12 (accommodation for up to 15 in total)
- Sensors & processing systems: 2x Furono navigation RADAR
- Armament: 2x 12.7 mm Heavy Machine Gun M/01 LvSa M2 Browning
- Notes: International Call Sign OVFA

HDMS Diana is the first of six vessels in the Diana-class built to patrol in the Danish territorial waters. The ship is named after the Roman goddess of the hunt. Diana, like all her sister ships, was built in Faaborg yard.

The ship was built to replace the aging Barsø class, which had become obsolete. The ship is equipped with a single Stan Flex container position, but is unable to accommodate all types of containers due to configuration issues. The position is primarily used for environmental projects and will utilize either a storage module or an anti-pollution module. Diana carries a water-jet propelled RHIB which is placed on a slide aft and can be hoisted and taken in almost any weather. The vessels are approved for operation in 10 cm ice.

The ships are designed to perform tasks such as monitoring and maritime policing, peacekeeping, search and rescue including preparedness for decompression sickness, environmental (pollution control) and acute explosive ordnance disposal, including the clearance of gas and ammunition.
