= Diana-class patrol vessel =

Royal Danish Navy patrol boat

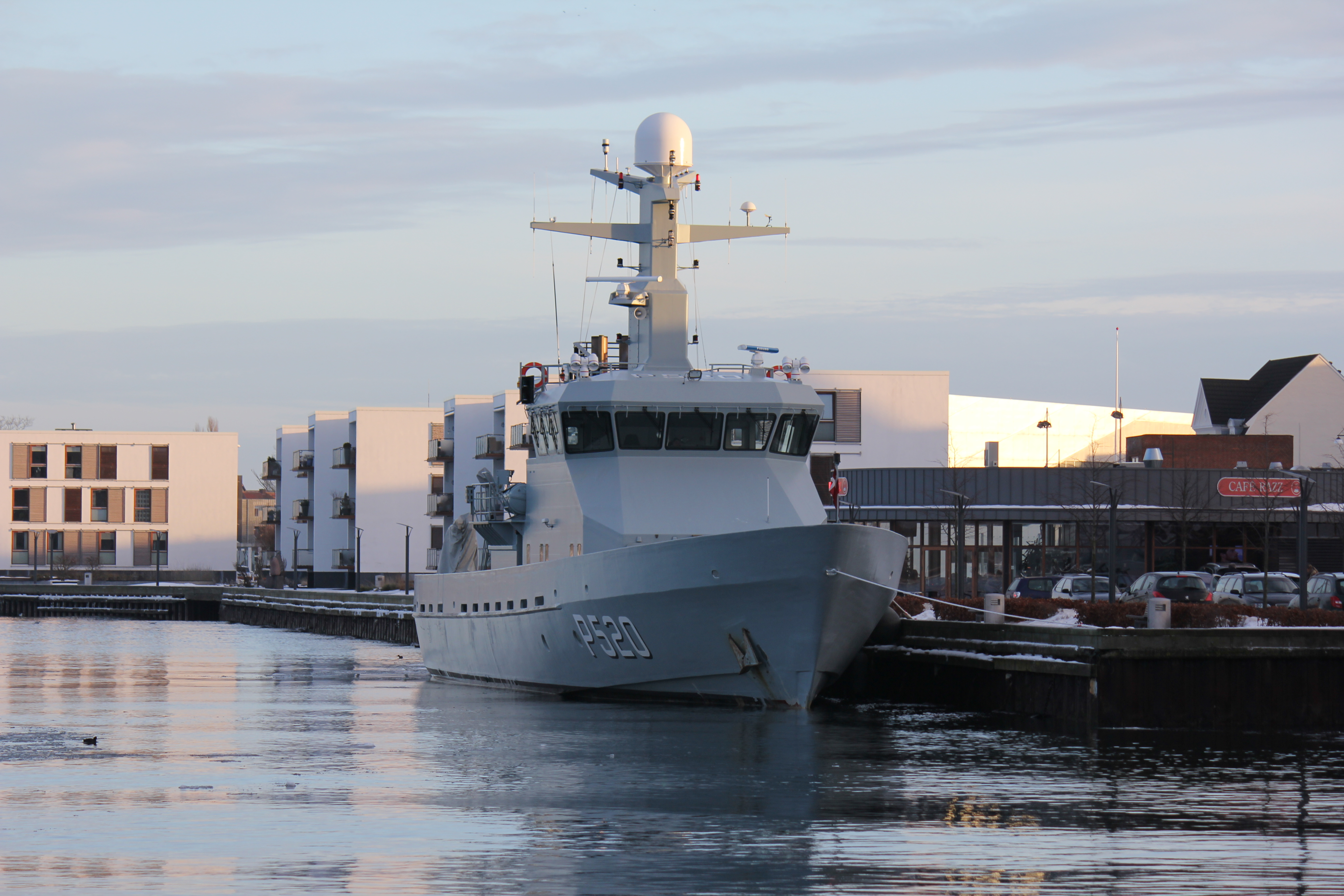
- HDMS Diana, lead ship of the class

Class overview
- Name: Diana class
- Operators: Royal Danish Navy
- Preceded by: Barsø class
- Built: 2005–2008
- In commission: 2007–present
- Planned: 6
- Completed: 6
- Active: 6

General characteristics
- Type: Patrol vessel
- Displacement: 280 t (280 long tons)
- Length: 43.0 m (141 ft 1 in)
- Beam: 8.2 m (26 ft 11 in)
- Draught: 2.2 m (7 ft 3 in)
- Propulsion: 2 × MTU 16V396 TB94 diesel engines; 2 shafts, controllable pitch propellers, 2,100 kW (2,816 bhp)
- Speed: 25 knots (46 km/h; 29 mph)
- Complement: 9
- Armament: 2 × 12.7 mm (0.50 in) machine guns

The Diana class, also known as the Minor Standard Craft Mk II, are a class of six patrol boats in service with the Royal Danish Navy. Built by Faaborg Værft A/S, the ships displace 280 tonnes (280 long tons) and have a maximum speed of 25 knots (46 km/h; 29 mph) knots. The class was intended to replace the aging Barsø class of patrol boats. The lead ship of the class, HDMS Diana, entered Danish service in 2007. The Diana-class vessels were initially tasked with fisheries protection, patrol and search and rescue but are currently tasked with international and combat operations.

== Design and description ==
The Diana class, also known as the Minor Standard Craft Mk II, are a series of patrol vessels constructed of glass reinforced plastic. They measure 43.0 metres (141 ft 1 in) long with a beam of 8.2 m (26 ft 11 in) and a draught of 2.0 m (6 ft 7 in). They are powered by two MTU 16V396 TB94 diesel engines turning two shafts with controllable pitch propellers creating 2,100 kilowatts (2,816 bhp). This gives the patrol vessels a maximum speed of 25 knots (46 km/h; 29 mph). (Note: Saunders states the vessels have a draught of 2.2 m (7 ft 3 in) and a maximum speed of 25 knots (46 km/h; 29 mph) and the engines create 2,000 kW (2,700 hp).) The ships mount two 12.7-millimetre (0.50 in) machine guns and have a complement of 9, with accommodation for 15 total. The Diana-class patrol vessels each have space for a StanFlex container, allowing for quick mission re-configuration.

== Ships ==
Construction data
Ship	Hull number	Laid down	Launched	Completed	In service	Status
Diana	P520	27 October 2005	27 March 2006	31 January 2007	December 2007	Active
Freja	P521	21 October 2005	29 August 2006	6 June 2007	September 2007	Active
Havfruen	P522	15 June 2006	29 November 2006	28 September 2007	May 2008	Active
Najaden	P523	7 September 2006	27 March 2007	18 January 2008	December 2008	Active
Nymfen	P524	6 December 2006	30 July 2007	30 April 2008	May 2009	Active
Rota	P525	9 March 2007	19 October 2007	30 April 2008	December 2009	Active

== Construction and service history ==
The class was ordered from Faaborg Værft A/S on 3 December 2004, with the hull, superstructure and machinery constructed by Kockums at their yard in Karlskrona, Sweden. Upon entering service, the Diana-class patrol vessels were used for fisheries protection, patrol and search and rescue. The six vessels of the Diana class are assigned to the Royal Danish Navy's 3rd Squadron, which is tasked with national operations and maritime surveillance.
