= HDMS Iver Huitfeldt (F361) =

Iver Huitfeldt-class frigate

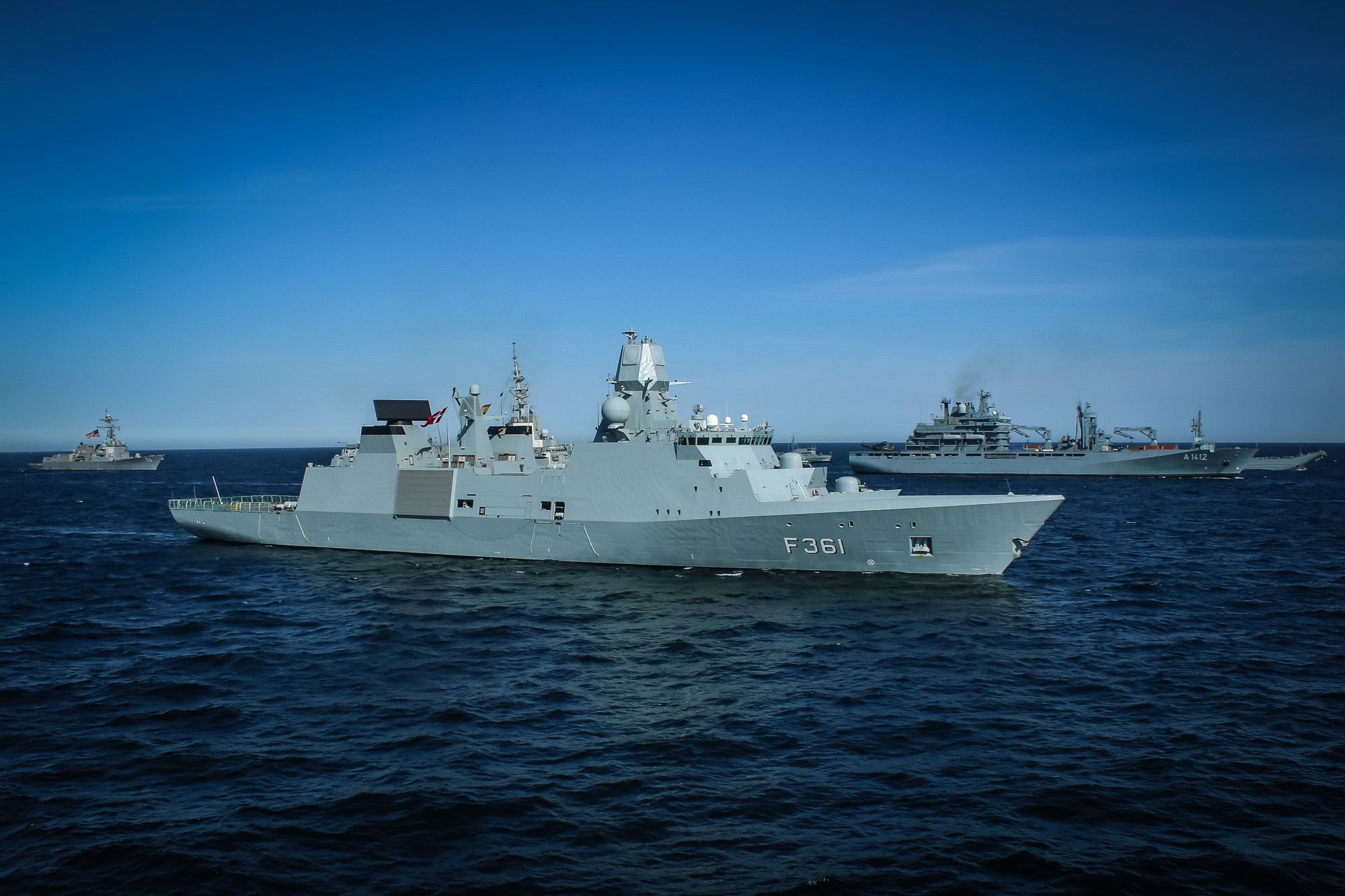
- HDMS Iver Huitfeldt underway, June 2018

History

Denmark
- Name: Iver Huitfeldt
- Namesake: Iver Huitfeldt
- Builder: Odense Steel Shipyard, Odense
- Laid down: 2 June 2008
- Launched: 11 March 2010
- Commissioned: 21 January 2011
- Home port: Korsør
- Identification: MMSI number: 219103000; Callsign: OVVA; Pennant number: F361
- Motto: En genio, et armis; (In genius, and armis)
- Status: Active
- Badge

General characteristics
- Notes: The three ship class have shared characteristics. Main article: Iver Huitfeldt-class frigate § Design

HDMS Iver Huitfeldt (F361) is a Iver Huitfeldt-class frigate in the Royal Danish Navy. The ship is named after Iver Huitfeldt, a 17th-century Danish officer.

== Design ==
The design is shared across the three ship class.

== Construction and service history ==
She was laid down in June 2008 and launched in March 2010 by Odense Steel Shipyard, Odense. She was commissioned in January 2011.

In 2020, the Iver Huitfeldt was attached to the USS Dwight D. Eisenhower carrier strike group, which included the guided missile cruisers USS Vella Gulf, USS San Jacinto, and the destroyers USS Stout, USS Truxtun, and USS James E. Williams. They left Norfolk Naval Base on 17 January 2020. She participated in Operation Agenor in August 2020, to ensure free compliance at sea.

On 29 January 2024, Iver Huitfeldt departed from Korsør naval base in Denmark for the Red Sea, to assist the US-led coalition in safeguarding commercial traffic against Houthi attacks. The frigate's air defences subsequently failed during armed combat against Houthi militants resulting in Chief of Defence Flemming Lentfer being fired by Deputy Prime Minister of Denmark and Minister for Defence Troels Lund Poulsen for failing to inform the government about long-standing problems with the weapons systems onboard the frigate.

== Gallery ==
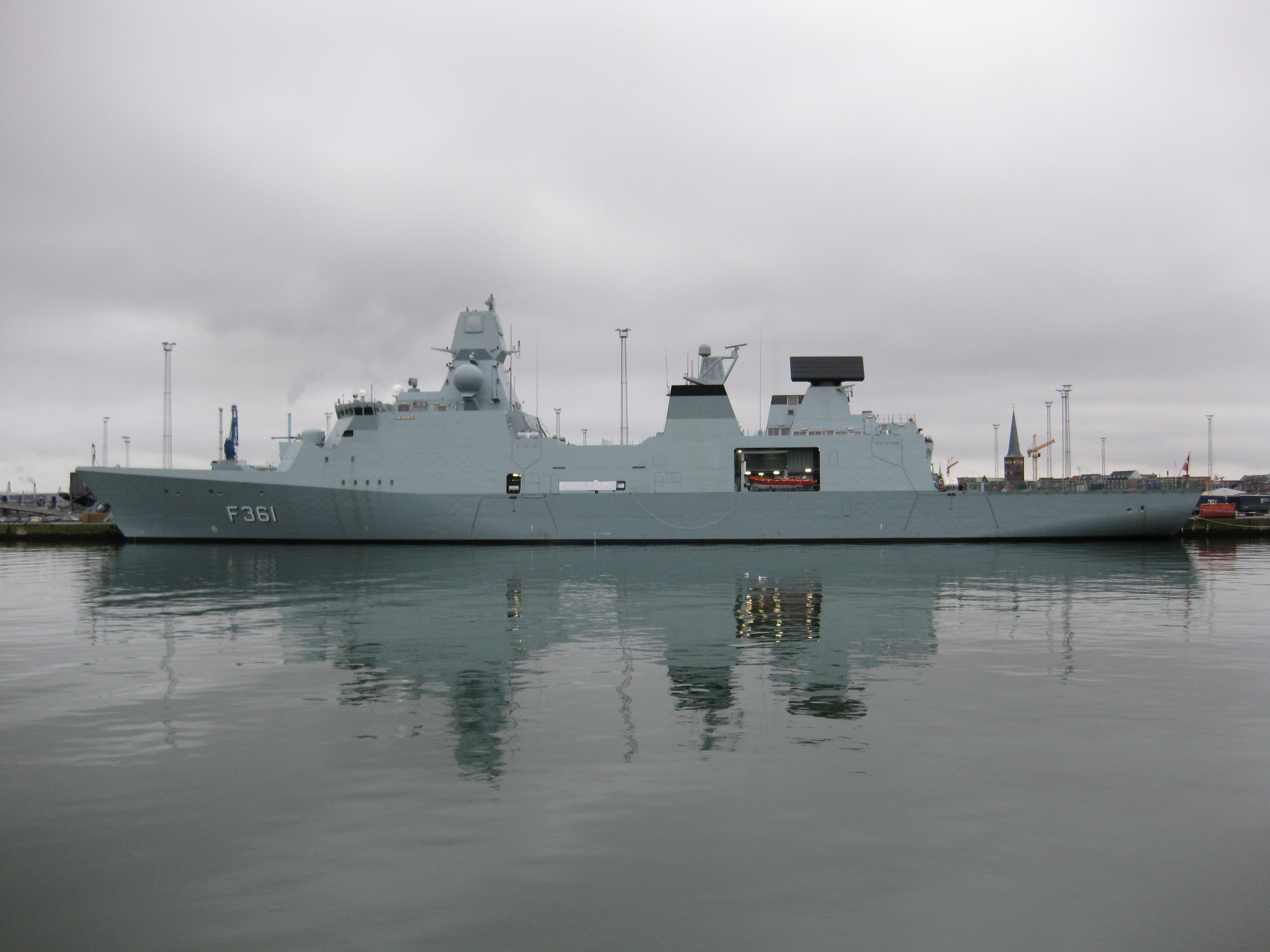
HDMS Iver Huitfeldt at Århus, January 2012.

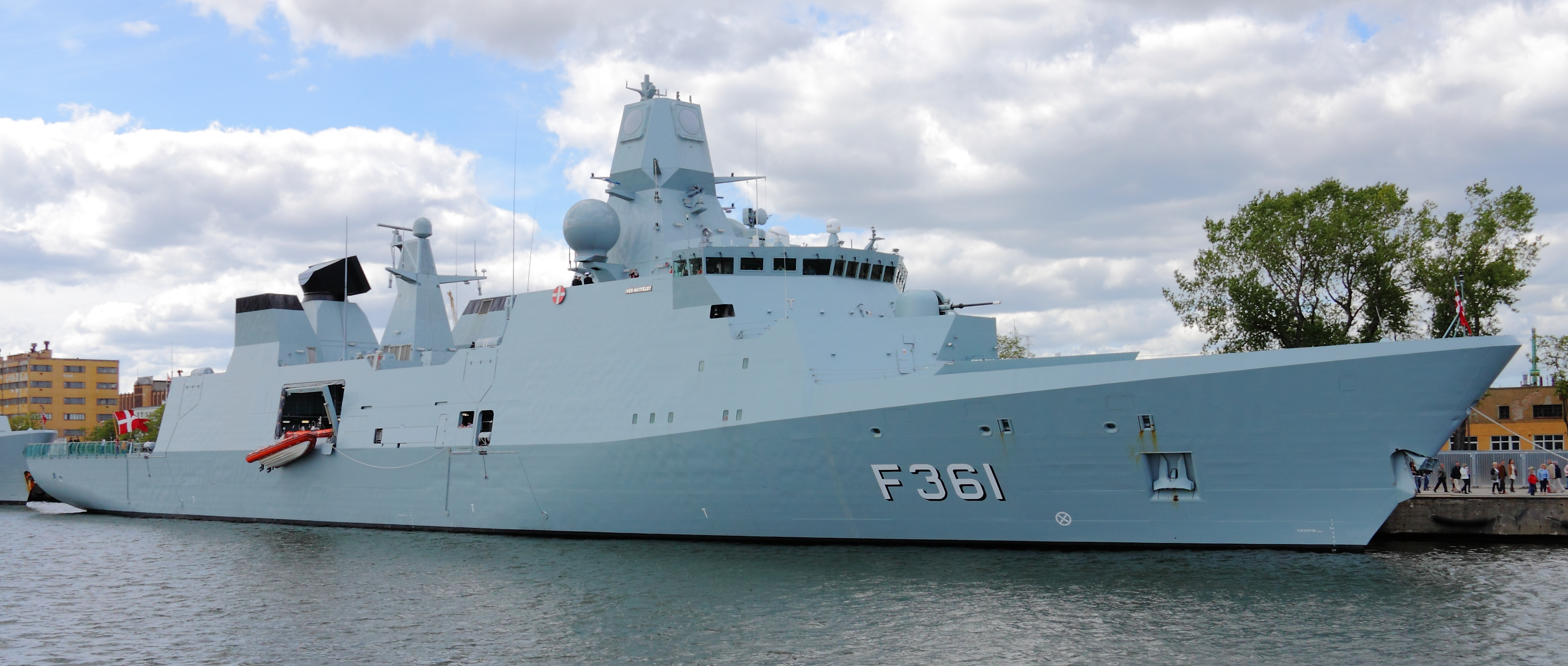
HDMS Iver Huitfeldt, June 2012.

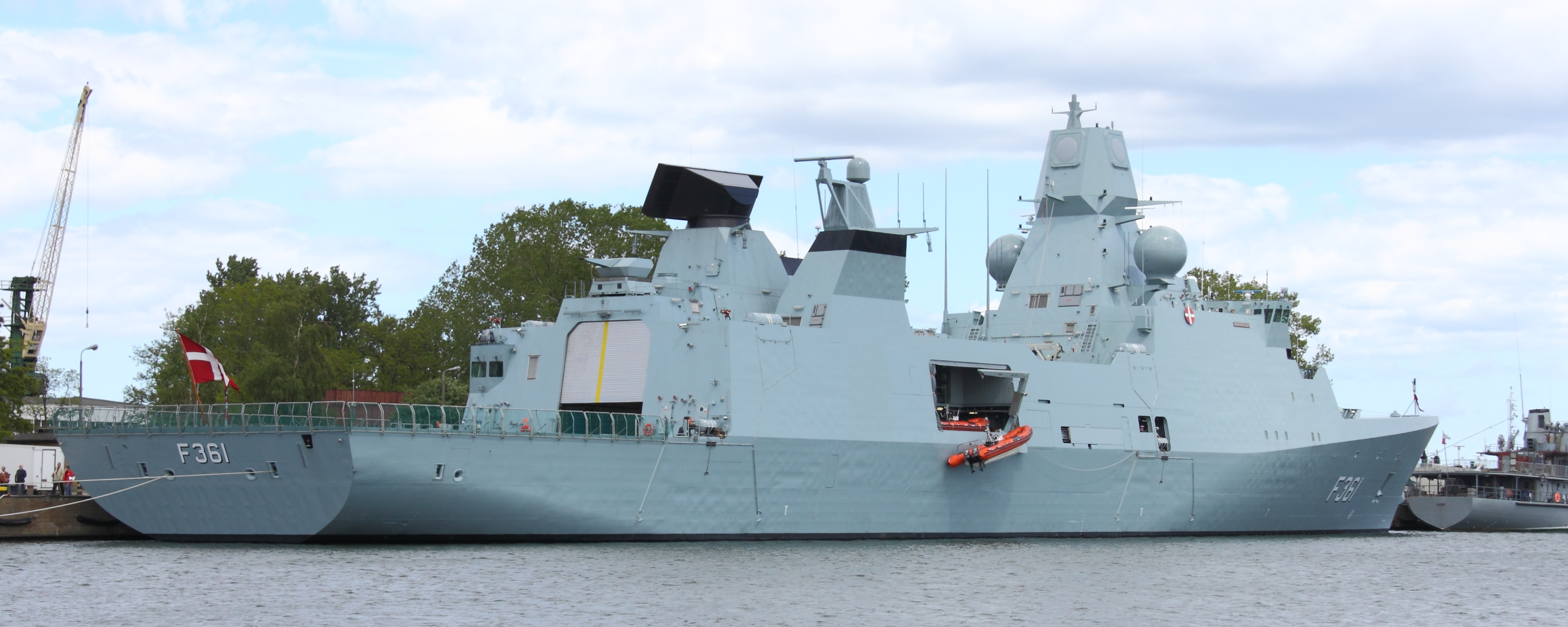
HDMS Iver Huitfeldt, June 2012.

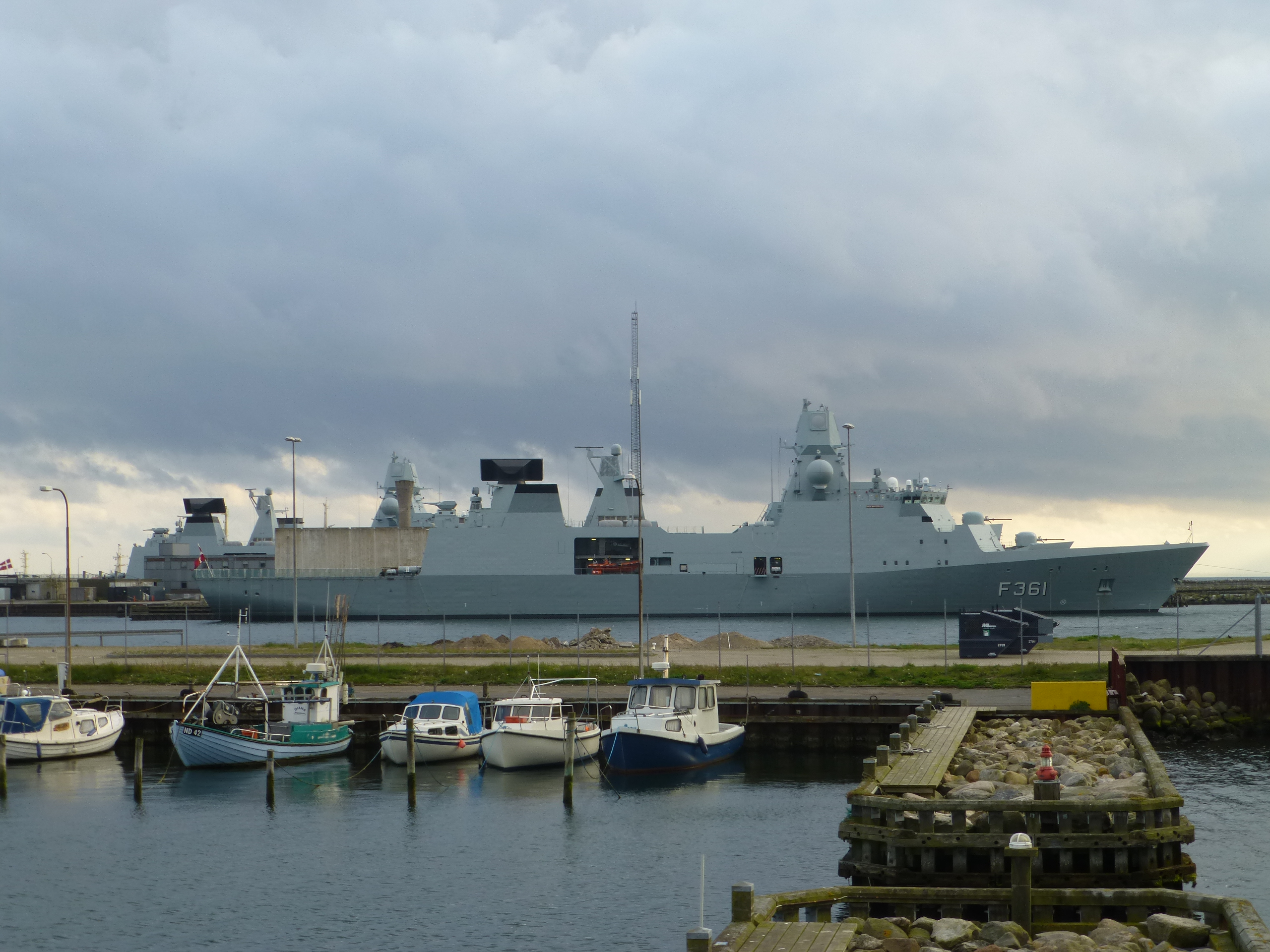
HDMS Iver Huitfeldt at Korsør, May 2015.

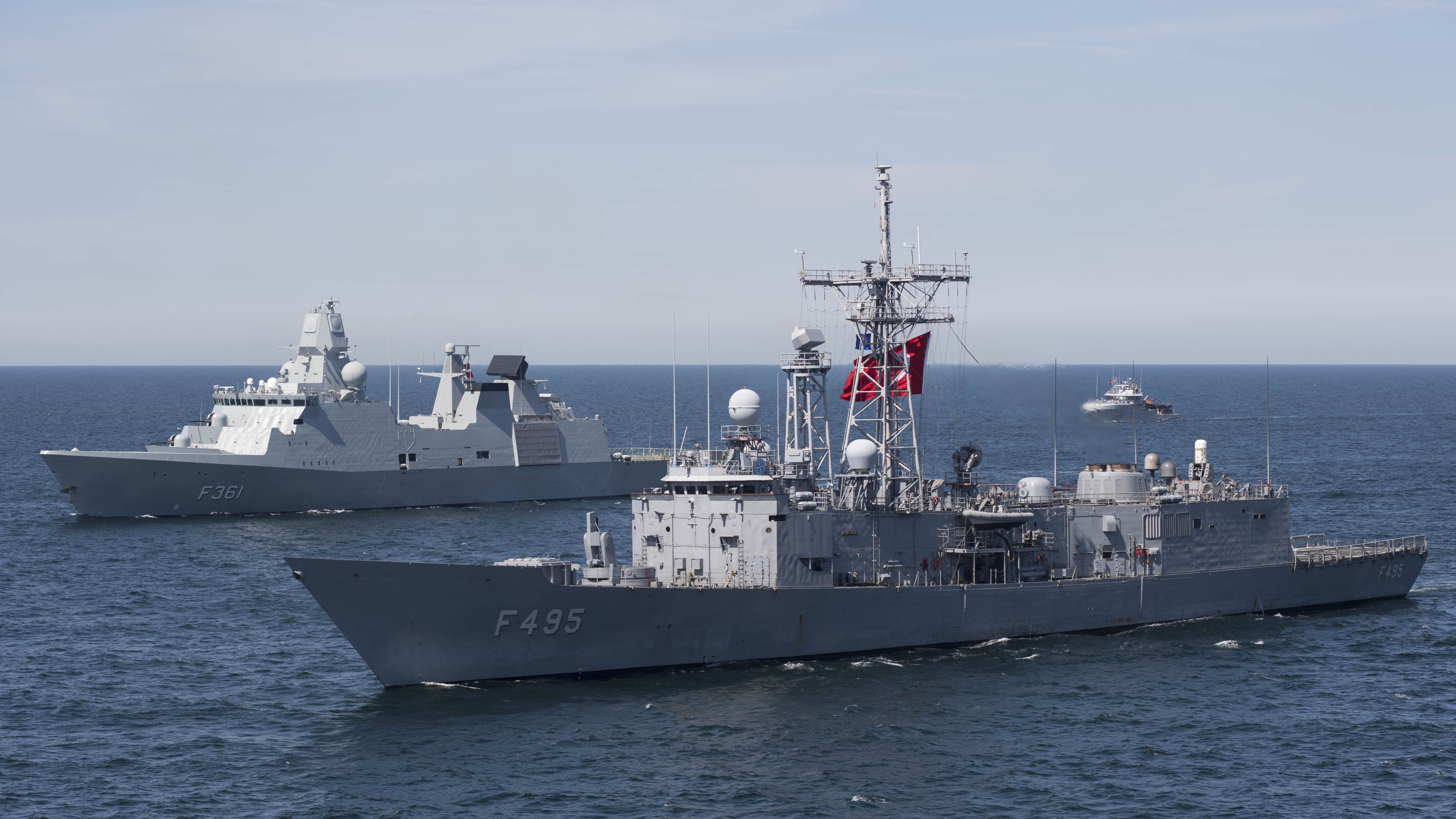
HDMS Iver Huitfeldt alongside TCG Gediz during BALTOPS 2018.
