= Allied Forces Baltic Approaches =

- Shield for Allied Forces Baltic Approaches
- Active: 1962-2002
- Disbanded: 2002
- Countries: Denmark; West Germany
- Part of: NATO Military Command Structure
- Headquarters: Karup, Denmark

Commanders
- Notable commanders: Otto K. Lind; Kjeld Hillingsø

Allied Forces Baltic Approaches (BALTAP) was a Principal Subordinate Command (PSC) of the NATO Military Command Structure, with responsibility for the Baltic Sea area. It was in existence from 1962 to 2002 and consisted of the Danish Armed Forces, units of the West German Bundeswehr and allied wartime reinforcements.

The NATO command Baltic Approaches was created on 8 January 1962, with headquarters in Karup, Denmark. It was created at Germany's urging, in order to end the previous separation of the German naval forces between the NATO commands Northern Europe and Central Europe. After the changes in the international security situation in 1990, the command was restructured in 1993 and deactivated in 2002.

The area of responsibility of BALTAP comprised the territory of Denmark (without Greenland and the Faroe Islands), the German states Hamburg and Schleswig-Holstein and the eastern North Sea, the Baltic approaches with Skagerrak, Kattegat, the Danish Straits, and the Baltic Sea. One peculiarity was the responsibility for air defence over the German part of the BALTAP area. Until 1990, the western Allies were responsible for air defence over the whole Federal Republic of Germany on the basis of the occupation statute. After France withdrew from the integrated military structure of the alliance, this task was undertaken by the United States and the United Kingdom. The Second Allied Tactical Air Force (2 ATAF) was responsible for the area of Schleswig-Holstein and Hamburg, and was led by a British officer from RAF Germany, with headquarters in Mönchengladbach.

BALTAP was led by a Danish officer with the rank of a Lieutenant General or a Vice Admiral, who had the designation Commander Allied Forces Baltic Approaches (COMBALTAP). His deputy was a German officer of the same rank. From 1962 to 1993, COMBALTAP was under the NATO command Allied Forces Northern Europe (AFNORTH) in Kolsås outside Oslo in Norway. After a change in the NATO structure, it was placed under Allied Forces Central Europe (AFCENT) on 1 October 1993. For the operational command of the air and sea forces, a partial assignment of these forces to Allied Forces Northwestern Europe (AFNORTHWEST) with its component commands AIRNORTHWEST and NAVNORTHWEST was made.

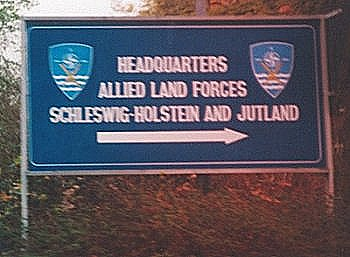
Sign for LANDJUT Headquarters, 1997

In case of war, COMBALTAP would have had to lead the NATO forces assigned to it. According to plans, all Danish forces with the exception of some units in the outer regions were to be placed under COMBALTAP. Germany had provided for its land and air forces stationed in the BALTAP area, and its entire naval and naval air forces, to be subordinated to COMBALTAP. In addition, external reinforcements from the United States and Britain (UK Mobile Force, primarily 1st Infantry Brigade) were planned.

== 1962 to 1993 ==
The initial structure remained with few changes from 1962 to 1994. During this time, BALTAP comprised four subordinate commands:

- Commander, Allied Land Forces Schleswig-Holstein and Jutland (COMLANDJUT) in Rendsburg
- Commander, Allied Land Forces in Zealand (COMLANDZEALAND) in Ringsted
- Commander, Allied Air Forces Baltic Approaches (COMAIRBALTAP) in Karup
- Commander, Allied Naval Forces Baltic Approaches (COMNAVBALTAP) in Karup

== Structure in 1989 ==
=== Commander, Allied Land Forces Schleswig-Holstein and Jutland ===
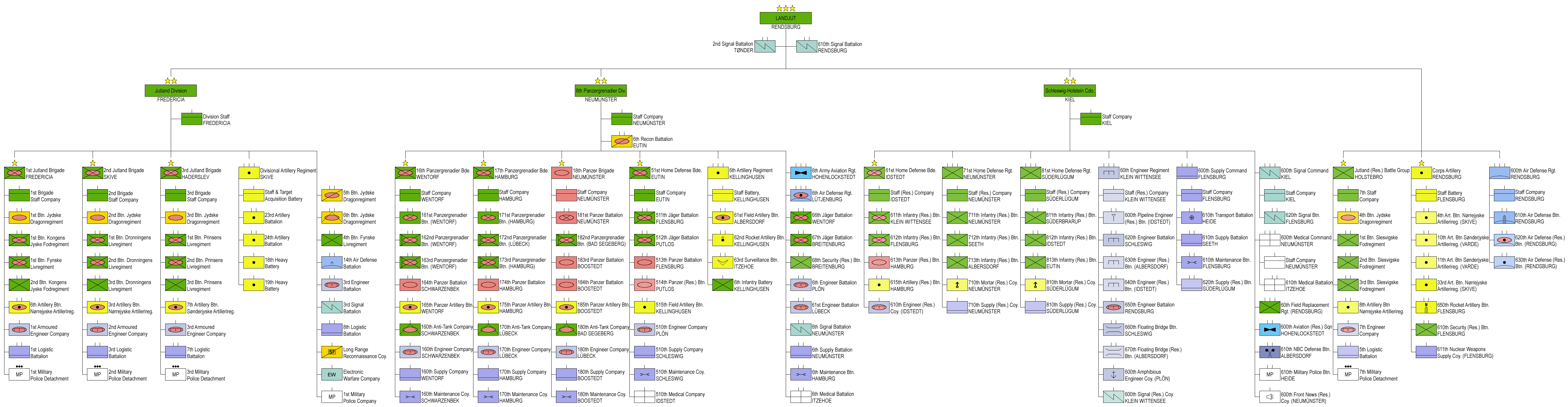
Structure of Allied Land Forces Schleswig-Holstein and Jutland in 1989 (click to enlarge) (needs update)

LANDJUT and its Danish units and Corps units in 1989
Brigades Battle Groups (Reserve) Artillery
LANDJUT and its Germans units and Corps units in 1989

LANDJUT was tasked with defending the Jutland peninsula. Holding Jutland was crucial for the mission of NAVBALTAP to keep the Danish Straits blocked and thus prevent the Soviet Baltic Fleet from breaking out into the North Sea. In case the Jutland peninsula would fall into Soviet hands, the LANDZEALAND units defending the Danish Isles would have been dangerously flanked. Therefore, LANDJUT was to be reinforced at the earliest with British and American troops to ensure that advancing Soviet forces would be prevented from crossing the Kiel Canal and Eider river.

British and American formations earmarked to reinforce LANDJUT included the British 1st Infantry Brigade and the American 9th Infantry Division. British infantry battalions and armoured regiments rotated every two years or so; thus locations are shown, but no unit identities.

After the end of the Cold War, LANDJUT was expanded into Multi-National Corps North East with the addition of Polish troops.

- Commander, Allied Land Forces Schleswig-Holstein and Jutland, Rendsburg, commanded by a Danish or German lieutenant general:
  - 610th Signal Battalion, Rendsburg
  - 2nd Signal Battalion, Tønder
  - Corps Artillery
    - HQ-Staff Battery, Flensburg
    - 33rd Artillery Battalion, Skive, Nørrejyske Artilleriregiment (24 × M59 155 mm gun)
    - 650th Rocket Artillery Battalion, Flensburg, (4 × Lance missile launcher)
    - 610th Security Battalion (Reserve), Flensburg
    - 611th Nuclear Weapons Supply Company, Flensburg
  - 600th Air Defence Regiment, Rendsburg
    - Staff Battery, 600th Air Defence Regiment, Rendsburg
    - 610th Air Defence Battalion, Rendsburg, (18 × Roland missile systems mounted Marder 1, 108 × FIM-43 Redeye launchers)
    - 620th Air Defence Battalion (Reserve), Rendsburg, (18 × Gepard, 108 × FIM-43 Redeye launchers)
    - 630th Air Defence Battalion (Reserve), Rendsburg, (24 × Bofors 40L70)
  - Jutland Battle Group (Reserve), Holstebro
    - 7th Staff Company
    - 4th Btn, Jydske Dragonregiment, (infantry)
    - 3rd Btn, Kongens Jyske Fodregiment, (Infantry)
    - 4th Btn, Prinsens Livregiment, (Infantry)
    - Tank destroyer Squadron, (10 × Centurion Mk V (84 mm gun))
    - 7th Engineer Company
    - 8th Artillery Btn, Nørrejyske Artilleriregiment, (18 × M101 105 mm howitzer)
    - 8th Logistic Battalion
    - 7th Military Police Detachment
  - 1st Infantry Brigade, Tidworth, UK, United Kingdom Mobile Force
    - HQ 1st Infantry Brigade & 215th Signal Squadron, Royal Signals, Tidworth
    - 13th/18th Royal Hussars, Tidworth, (24 × FV101 Scorpion, 24 × FV107 Scimitar, 16 × FV102 Striker, 19 × FV103 Spartan)
    - 1st Btn, Queen's Regiment, Tidworth, (43 × Saxon, 8 × FV721 Fox, 8 × 81 mm mortars)
    - 1st Btn, Devonshire and Dorset Regiment, Bulford, (43 × Saxon, 8 × FV721 Fox, 8 × 81 mm mortars)
    - 1st Btn, Royal Hampshire Regiment, Tidworth, (43 × Saxon, 8 × FV721 Fox, 8 × 81 mm mortars)
    - 1st Btn, Wessex Regiment (V), Devizes
    - C Squadron, Royal Hussars (Prince of Wales Own), Tidworth, (14 × Chieftain tanks)
    - 47th Field Regiment, Royal Artillery, Thorney Island, (24 × FH-70 howitzers)
    - 22nd Engineer Regiment, Royal Engineers, Perham Down
    - No. 656 (Anti-Tank Helicopter) Squadron, Army Air Corps, (3 × Gazelle AH.1, 9 × Lynx AH.1), from 7 Regiment, Army Air Corps

==== Jutland Division ====
- Jutland Division, Fredericia
  - 3rd Signal Battalion (Division HQ)
  - 3rd Engineer Battalion
  - 4th Battalion, Fynske Livregiment, (Motorised infantry Battalion: 10 × Centurion Mk V (84 mm gun))
  - 6th Battalion, Jydske Dragonregiment, (Tank destroyer Battalion: 50 × Centurion Mk V (84 mm gun))
  - 5th Battalion, Jydske Dragonregiment, (Reconnaissance: 18 × M41 DK-1, 9 × M113, 9 × M125)
  - Long Range Reconnaissance Company, Dronningens Livregiment
  - Electronic Warfare Company
  - 1st Jutland Brigade, Fredericia
    - 1st Brigade Staff Company (including 5 × M113, 8 × TOW on Land Rover)
    - 1st Battalion, Jydske Dragonregiment, (20 × Leopard 1A3, 21 × M113 (including 4 with TOW), 2 × M125 mortar carriers)
    - 1st Battalion, Fynske Livregiment, (10 × Leopard 1A3, 32 × M113 (including 4 with TOW), 4 × M125, 4 × TOW on Land Rover)
    - 2nd Battalion, Prinsens Livregiment, (10 × Leopard 1A3, 32 × M113 (including 4 with TOW), 4 × M125, 4 × TOW on Land Rover)
    - 6th Artillery Battalion, Nørrejyske Artilleriregiment, (12 × M109A3 howitzer, 8 × M114/39 155 mm howitzer, 15 × M113)
    - 1st Armoured Engineer Company (6 × M113)
    - 4th Logistic Battalion
    - 1st Military Police Detachment
  - 2nd Jutland Brigade, Skive
    - 2nd Brigade Staff Company (including 5 × M113, 8 × TOW on Land Rover)
    - 2nd Battalion, Jydske Dragonregiment, (20 × Leopard 1A3, 21 × M113 (including 4 with TOW), 2 × M125)
    - 1st Battalion, Dronningens Livregiment, (10 × Leopard 1A3, 32 × M113 (including 4 with TOW), 4 × M125, 4 × TOW on Land Rover)
    - 2nd Battalion, Dronningens Livregiment, (10 × Leopard 1A3, 32 × M113 (including 4 with TOW), 4 × M125, 4 × TOW on Land Rover)
    - 3rd Artillery Battalion, Nørrejyske Artilleriregiment, (12 × M109A3 howitzer, 8 × M114/39 155 mm howitzer, 15 × M113)
    - 2nd Armoured Engineer Company
    - 5th Logistic Battalion
    - 2nd Military Police Detachment
  - 3rd Jutland Brigade, Haderslev
    - 3rd Brigade Staff Company (including 5 × M113, 8 × TOW on Land Rover)
    - 3rd Battalion, Jydske Dragonregiment, (20 × Leopard 1A3, 21 × M113 (including 4 with TOW), 2 × M125)
    - 1st Battalion, Prinsens Livregiment, (10 × Leopard 1A3, 32 × M113 (including 4 with TOW), 4 × M125, 4 × TOW on Land Rover)
    - 1st Battalion, Kongens Jyske Fodregiment, (10 × Leopard 1A3, 32 × M113 (including 4 with TOW), 4 × M125, 4 × TOW on Land Rover)
    - 7th Artillery Battalion, Sønderjyske Artilleriregiment, (12 × M109A3 howitzer, 8 × M114/39 howitzer, 15 × M113)
    - 3rd Armoured Engineer Company
    - 7th Logistic Battalion
    - 3rd Military Police Detachment
  - Divisional Artillery Regiment Skive
    - Staff and Target Acquisition Battery
    - 23rd Artillery Battalion, (18 × M114/39 155 mm howitzer)
    - 24th Artillery Battalion, (18 × M114/39 155 mm howitzer)
    - 18th Heavy Battery, (4 × M115 203 mm howitzer)
    - 19th Heavy Battery, (4 × M115 203 mm howitzer)
  - 14th Air Defence Battalion, (Stinger, Bofors 40 mm L/70)
  - Divisional Logistic Ålborg
    - 3rd Logistic Battalion
    - 10th Supply Battalion
    - Heavy Transport Company
    - 2nd Military Police Company

==== 6th Panzergrenadier Division ====
- 6th Panzergrenadier Division, Neumünster
  - Staff Company, 6th Panzergrenadier Division, Neumünster
  - 16th Panzergrenadier Brigade, Wentorf
    - Staff Company, 16th Panzergrenadier Brigade, Wentorf, (8 × M577, 8 × Luchs)
    - 161st Panzergrenadier Battalion, Wentorf, (13 × Leopard 1A1A1, 24 × Marder, 12 × M113)
    - 162nd Panzergrenadier Battalion, Wentorf, (24 × Marder, 6 × Panzermörser, 23 × M113)
    - 163rd Panzergrenadier Battalion, Wentorf, (24 × Marder, 6 × Panzermörser, 23 × M113)
    - 164th Panzer Battalion, Schwarzenbek, (41 × Leopard 1A1A1, 12 × M113)
    - 165th Panzer Artillery Battalion, Wentorf, (18 × M109A3G)
    - 160th Anti-Tank Company, Schwarzenbek, (12 × Jaguar 2)
    - 160th Armored Engineer Company, Schwarzenbek
    - 160th Supply Company, Wentorf
    - 160th Maintenance Company, Schwarzenbek
  - 17th Panzergrenadier Brigade, Hamburg
    - Staff Company, 17th Panzergrenadier Brigade, Hamburg, (8 × M577, 8 × Luchs)
    - 171st Panzergrenadier Battalion, Hamburg, (13 × Leopard 1A1A2, 24 × Marder, 12 × M113)
    - 172nd Panzergrenadier Battalion, Lübeck, (24 × Marder, 6 × Panzermörser, 23 × M113)
    - 173rd Panzergrenadier Battalion, Hamburg, (24 × Marder, 6 × Panzermörser, 23 × M113)
    - 174th Panzer Battalion, Hamburg, (41 × Leopard 1A1A2, 12 × M113)
    - 177th Panzer Artillery Battalion, Hamburg, (18 × M109A3G)
    - 170th Anti-Tank Company, Lübeck, (12 × Jaguar 1)
    - 170th Armored Engineer Company, Lübeck
    - 170th Supply Company, Hamburg
    - 170th Maintenance Company, Hamburg
  - 18th Panzer Brigade, Neumünster
    - Staff Company, 18th Panzer Brigade, Neumünster, (8 × M577, 8 × Luchs)
    - 181st Panzer Battalion, Neumünster, (28 × Leopard 1A2, 6 × Marder, 12 × M113)
    - 182nd Panzergrenadier Battalion, Bad Segeberg, (35 × Marder, 6 × Panzermörser, 12 × M113)
    - 183rd Panzer Battalion, Boostedt, (41 × Leopard 1A2, 12 × M113)
    - 184th Panzer Battalion, Boostedt, (41 × Leopard 1A2, 12 × M113)
    - 185th Panzer Artillery Battalion, Boostedt, (18 × M109A3G)
    - 180th Anti-Tank Company, Bad Segeberg, (12 × Jaguar 1)
    - 180th Armored Engineer Company, Lübeck
    - 180th Supply Company, Boostedt
    - 180th Maintenance Company, Boostedt
  - 51st Home Defence Brigade, Eutin (originally a brigade of the Territorial Army; it was partially activated and staffed in 1982 and subordinated to the 6th Division as reinforcement in 1985)
    - Staff Company, 51st Home Defence Brigade, Eutin, (8 × M577, 8 × Luchs)
    - 511th Jäger Battalion, Flensburg, (7 × Leopard 1A1A2, 6 × Panzermörser)
    - 512th Jäger Battalion, Putlos, (7 × Leopard 1A1A2, 30 × M113, 6 × Panzermörser)
    - 513th Panzer Battalion, Flensburg, (41 × Leopard 1A1A2, 12 × M113)
    - 514th Panzer Battalion (Reserve), Putlos, (41 × Leopard 1A1A2, 12 × M113)
    - 515th Field Artillery Battalion, Kellinghusen, (18 × M101)
    - 517th Field Replacement Battalion, Süderbrarup
    - 510th Armored Engineer Company, Plön
    - 510th Medical Company, Idstedt
    - 510th Supply Company, Schleswig
    - 510th Maintenance Company, Schleswig
  - 6th Artillery Regiment, Kellinghusen
    - Staff Battery, 6th Artillery Regiment, Kellinghusen
    - 61st Field Artillery Battalion, Albersdorf, (18 × M110A2, 18 × FH-70)
    - 62nd Rocket Artillery Battalion, Kellinghusen, (16 × LARS, 16 × MLRS)
    - 63rd Surveillance Battalion, Itzehoe, (12 × CL-89 drones)
    - 6th Custodial Battery, Kellinghusen
  - 6th Army Aviation Regiment, Hohenlockstedt, (15 × BO-105M, 24 × UH-1D, 21 × PAH-1)
  - 6th Air Defence Regiment, Lütjenburg, (36 × Gepard, 216 × FIM-43 Redeye launchers)
  - 6th Armored Reconnaissance Battalion, Eutin, (34 × Leopard 1A1A1, 10 × Luchs, 18 × Fuchs – 9 of which carry a RASIT radar)
  - 6th Engineer Battalion, Plön, (8 × Biber AVLB, 8 × Pionierpanzer 1, 4 × Skorpion Mine Layers, 12 × Floating Bridge Modules)
  - 61st Engineer Battalion, Lübeck, (8 × Biber AVLB, 8 × Pionierpanzer 1, 4 × Skorpion Mine Layers, 12 × Floating Bridge Modules)
  - 6th Signal Battalion, Neumünster
  - 6th Medical Battalion, Itzehoe
  - 6th Supply Battalion, Neumünster
  - 6th Maintenance Battalion, Hamburg
  - 5 × Field Replacement Battalions: 61st and 65th in Neumünster, 62nd in Itzehoe, 63rd and 64th in Hamburg
  - 66th Jäger Battalion (aktiv), Wentorf, (30 × M113, 6 × Panzermörser)
  - 67th Jäger Battalion (aktiv), Breitenburg, (30 × M113, 6 × Panzermörser)
  - 68th Security Battalion (Reserve), Breitenburg

==== Territorial Command Schleswig-Holstein ====
- Territorial Command Schleswig-Holstein, Kiel
  - Staff Company, Territorial Command Schleswig-Holstein, Kiel
  - 600th Front Intelligence Company (Reserve), Neumünster
  - 61st Home Defence Brigade, Idstedt
    - Staff Company (Reserve), 61st Home Defence Brigade, Idstedt
    - 611th Infantry Battalion (Reserve), Klein Wittensee, (7 × Leopard 1A1A1)
    - 612th Infantry Battalion (Reserve), Flensburg, (7 × Leopard 1A1A1)
    - 613th Panzer Battalion (Reserve), Hamburg, (41 × Leopard 1A1A1, 12 × M113)
    - 615th Artillery Battalion (Reserve), Hamburg, (18 × M101)
    - 610th Engineer Company (Reserve), Idstedt
  - 71st Home Defence Regiment, Neumünster
    - Staff Company (Reserve), 71st Home Defence Regiment, Neumünster
    - 711th Infantry Battalion (Reserve), Neumünster
    - 712th Infantry Battalion (Reserve), Seeth
    - 713th Infantry Battalion (Reserve), Albersdorf
    - 710th Mortar Company (Reserve), Neumünster, (18 × 120 mm mortars)
    - 710th Supply Company (Reserve), Neumünster
  - 81st Home Defence Regiment, Süderlügum
    - Staff Company (Reserve), 81st Home Defence Regiment, Süderlügum
    - 811th Infantry Battalion (Reserve), Süderbrarup
    - 812th Infantry Battalion (Reserve), Idstedt
    - 813th Infantry Battalion (Reserve), Eutin
    - 810th Mortar Company (Reserve), Süderlügum, (18 × 120 mm mortars)
    - 810th Supply Company (Reserve), Süderlügum
  - 60th Engineer Regiment, Klein Wittensee
    - Staff Company (Reserve), 60th Engineer Regiment, Klein Wittensee
    - 620th Engineer Battalion, Schleswig
    - 630th Engineer Battalion (Reserve), Albersdorf
    - 640th Engineer Battalion (Reserve), Idstedt
    - 650th Engineer Battalion, Rendsburg, (8 × Biber AVLB, 8 × Pionierpanzer 1, 4 × Skorpion Mine Layers, 12 × Floating Bridge Modules)
    - 660th Floating Bridging Battalion, Schleswig
    - 670th Floating Bridging Battalion (Reserve), Albersdorf
    - 600th Pipeline Engineer Battalion (Reserve), Idstedt
    - 600th Amphibious Engineer Company, Plön
    - 600th Signal Company (Reserve), Klein Wittensee
  - 600th Signal Command, Kiel
    - Staff Company, 600th Signal Command, Kiel
    - 620th Signal Battalion, Flensburg
  - 600th Medical Command, Neumünster
    - Staff Company, 600th Medical Command, Neumünster
    - 610th Medical Battalion, Itzehoe
    - 6 × Medical Transport Companies, 6 × Field Clinics, 55 × Field Hospitals
  - 600th Supply Command, Flensburg
    - Staff Company, 600th Supply Command, Flensburg
    - 610th Transport Battalion, Heide
    - 610th Supply Battalion, Seeth
    - 620th Supply Battalion (Reserve), Süderlügum
    - 610th Maintenance Battalion, Flensburg
  - 60th Field Replacement Regiment, Rendsburg
    - Staff Company (Reserve), 60th Field Replacement Regiment, Rendsburg
    - 602nd Field Replacement Battalion (Reserve), Rendsburg
    - 603rd Field Replacement Battalion (Reserve), Rendsburg
    - 604th Field Replacement Battalion (Reserve), Rendsburg
  - 610th Military Police Battalion, Heide
  - 600th Army Aviation Squadron (Reserve), Hohenlockstedt
  - 610th NBC Defence Battalion, Albersdorf
  - 610th Field Replacement Battalion (Reserve), Husum
  - 620th Field Replacement Battalion (Reserve), Idelstedt
  - 6 × Training Battalions
  - 10 × Home Defence Companies

==== Territorial Command Jutland and Funen ====
All territorial army units were part of the reserve.

- Territorial Command Jutland and Funen (VLK) in Fredericia
  - 5th Signal Battalion
  - 5th Engineer Battalion
  - LRRP Company (SEP/VLK (Homeguard))
  - Host and Support Battalion (Supporting arrival of NATO reinforcements in Jutland and northern Germany)
  - Rear and Sustainment Battalion
  - Logistics Support Group West (LSG-W)
    - Supply Battalion
    - Transport Battalion
    - Medical Battalion (incl. Medical Train)
    - Maintenance Battalion
    - Field Replacement Commando
  - 1st Territorial Region (Northern Jutland) in Aalborg
    - 3rd Btn, Dronningens Livregiment, (Infantry)
    - 15th Light Battery, Nørrejyske Artilleriregiment (8 × M101 105 mm howitzer)
    - Engineer Company
    - 6 × Homeguard Districts
      - 6 × Homeguard Staff Companies
      - 31 × Area Companies
      - 6 × Homeguard Military Police Companies
  - 2nd Territorial Region (Middle Jutland) in Viborg
    - 3rd Btn, Prinsens Livregiment, (Infantry)
    - 9th Light Battery, Nørrejyske Artilleriregiment (8 × M101 105 mm howitzer)
    - Engineer Company
    - 10 × Homeguard Districts
      - 10 × Homeguard Staff Companies
      - 56 × Area Companies
      - 10 × Homeguard Military Police Companies
  - 3rd Territorial Region (Southern Jutland) in Haderslev
    - 2nd Btn, Kongens Jyske Fodregiment, (Infantry)
    - 3rd Btn, Slesvigske Fodregiment, (Infantry)
    - 10th Artillery Battalion (Reserve), Varde, Sønderjyske Artilleriregiment (16 × M101 105 mm howitzer)
    - Engineer Company
    - 11 × Homeguard Districts
      - 11 × Homeguard Staff companies
      - 53 × Area Companies
      - 11 × Homeguard Military Police Companies
  - 4th Territorial Region (Funen) in Odense
    - 2nd Btn, Fynske Livregiment, (Motorized Infantry) incl Two Tank destroyer Squadron, (2 × 12 Centurion Mk V (84 mm gun))
    - 3rd Btn, Fynske Livregiment, (Infantry)
    - 11th Artillery Battalion (Reserve), Varde, Sønderjyske Artilleriregiment (16 × M101 105 mm howitzer)
    - Engineer Company
    - 5 × Homeguard Districts
      - 5 × Homeguard staff companies
      - 32 × Area Companies
      - 5 × Homeguard Military Police Companies

=== Commander, Allied Land Forces Zealand ===
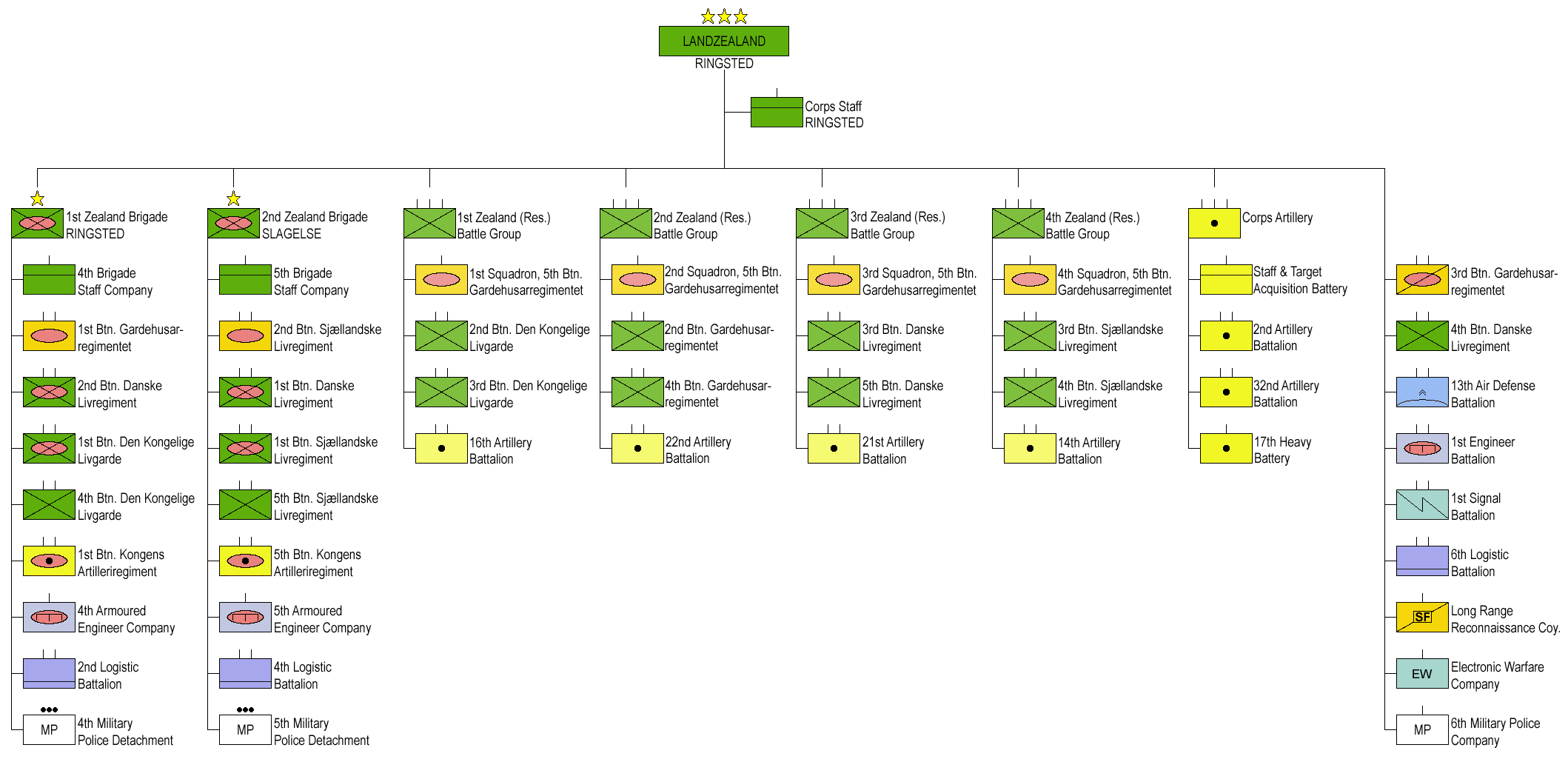
Structure of Allied Land Forces Zealand in 1989 (Needs update)

Units ad LANDZEALAND and Bornholms Værn in 1989
Brigades Battle Groups Corps Artillery

LANDZEALAND was tasked with defending the Danish Isles incl. Bornholm and preventing Warsaw Pact troops from amphibious landings. Order of battle in 1988.

- Commander, Allied Land Forces in Zealand (ELK), Ringsted, commanded by a Danish lieutenant general:
  - 1st Signal Battalion
  - 1st Engineer Battalion
  - 3rd Btn, Gardehusarregimentet, (Reconnaissance: 18 × M41 DK-1, 12 × M113, 9 × M125)
  - Electronic Warfare Company
  - LRRP Company (SEP/ELK (Homeguard))
  - 9th Logistic Battalion
  - 1st Zealand Brigade
    - 4th Brigade Staff Company (5 × M113, 8 × TOW on Land Rover)
    - 1st Btn, Gardehusarregimentet, (30 × Centurion Mk5/2.DK (105 mm L7 gun), 25 × M113 (incl 4 with TOW), 2 × M125)
    - 2nd Btn, Danske Livregiment, (Mechanised Infantry – 10 × Centurion (105 mm L7 gun), 46 × M113 (including 4 with TOW), 6 × M106, 4 TOW on Land Rover)
    - 1st Btn, Sjællandske Livregiment, (Mechanised Infantry – 10 × Centurion (105 mm L7 gun), 46 × M113 (including 4 with TOW), 6 × M106, 4 TOW on Land Rover)
    - 4th Btn, Den Kongelige Livgarde, (Light Infantry)
    - 1st Btn, Kongens Artilleriregiment, (12 × M109A3, 8 × M114/39, 14 × M113 (1 × Kommando (BAO) 6 × Artilleryobserver 4 × SKC and 1 × Greenarcher)))
    - 4th Armoured Engineer Company
    - 1st Logistic Battalion
    - 4th Military Police Detachment
  - 2nd Zealand Brigade
    - 5th Brigade Staff Company (5 × M113, 8 × TOW on Land Rover)
    - 2nd Btn, Sjællandske Livregiment, (30 × Centurion Mk5/2.DK (105 mm L7 gun), 25 × M113 (incl 4 with TOW), 2 × M125)
    - 1st Btn, Danske Livregiment, (Mechanised Infantry – 10 × Centurion (105 mm L7 gun), 46 × M113 (including 4 with TOW), 6 × M106, 4 TOW on Land Rover)
    - 1st Btn, Den Kongelige Livgarde, (Mechanised Infantry – 10 × Centurion (105 mm L7 gun), 46 × M113 (including 4 with TOW), 6 × M106, 4 TOW on Land Rover)
    - 5th Btn, Sjællandske Livregiment, (Light Infantry)
    - 5th Btn, Kongens Artilleriregiment, (12 × M109A3, 8 × M114/39, 14 × M113 (1 × Kommando (BAO) 6 × Artillery observer 4 × SKC and 1 × Greenarcher)))
    - 5th Armoured Engineer Company
    - 2nd Logistic Battalion
    - 5th Military Police Detachment
  - 1st Zealand Battle Group (Reserve)
    - Staff Company, (Den Kongelige Livgarde)
    - 1st Antitank Squadron Gardehusarregimentet, (8 × Centurion MkV (84 mm gun))
    - 2nd Btn, Den Kongelige Livgarde, (Infantry)
    - 3rd Btn, Den Kongelige Livgarde, (Infantry)
    - 16th Artillery Battalion, (16 × M101) (Forkert antal alle 4 105 mm afdelinger havde enten 18 eller 24 rør 3 × 6 /3 × 8)
    - Logistic Company
  - 2nd Zealand Battle Group (Reserve)
    - Staff Company, (Gardehusarregimentet)
    - 2nd Antitank Squadron, Gardehusarregimentet, (8 × Centurion MkV (84 mm gun))
    - 2nd Btn, Gardehusarregimentet, (Infantry)
    - 4th Btn, Gardehusarregimentet, (Infantry)
    - 22nd Artillery Battalion, (16 × M101)
  - 3rd Zealand Battle Group (Reserve)
    - Staff Company, (Danske Livregiment)
    - 3rd Antitank Squadron Gardehusarregimentet, (8 × Centurion MkV (84 mm gun))
    - 3rd Btn, Danske Livregiment, (Infantry)
    - 4th Btn, Danske Livregiment, (Infantry)
    - 21st Artillery Battalion, (16 × M101)
    - Logistic Company
  - 4th Zealand Battle Group (Reserve)
    - 4th Antitank Squadron, Gardehusarregimentet, (8 × Centurion MkV (84 mm gun))
    - Staff Company, (Sjællandske Livregiment)
    - 3rd Btn, Sjællandske Livregiment, (Infantry)
    - 4th Btn, Sjællandske Livregiment, (Infantry)
    - 4th Artillery Battalion, (16 × M101)
    - Logistic Company
  - Corps Artillery
    - Staff and Target Acquisition Battery
    - 2nd Artillery Battalion, (18 × M114/39 155 mm howitzer)
    - 32nd Artillery Battalion, (18 × M114/39 155 mm howitzer)
    - 17th Heavy Battery, (4 × M115 203 mm howitzer)
  - 13th Air Defence Battalion, (Stinger)
  - Corps Logistic
    - 6th Logistic Battalion
    - 6th Military Police Company

==== Bornholms Værn ====
The island of Bornholm was in wartime independent, due to the long distance from Zealand and agreements after World War II said that no foreign units could reinforce Bornholm. Therefore, Bornholm had only the Battlegroup and homeguard units of the 7th Territorial Region.

- Bornholms Værn's Battle Group
  - Staff and Signal Company
  - 1st Battalion, Bornholms Værn (infantry) (4 × TOW on Land Rover)
  - 2nd Battalion, Bornholms Værn (infantry) (reserve) (4 × TOW on Land Rover)
  - 3rd Battalion, Bornholms Værn (infantry) (reserve) (12 × 106 mm RR on Jeep M38)
  - Light Tank Squadron,"Bornholm Dragoons" (10 × M41 DK-1)
  - Light Reconnaissance Squadron (6 × M41 DK-1)
  - 12th Artillery Battalion (18 × M101)
  - Air Defence Battery (Stinger)
  - Bornholm Engineer Company
  - Logistic Company

==== Territorial Commander, Allied Land Forces in Zealand ====
Except for the Royal Guard Company and the Mounted Hussar Squadron, which were made up of conscripts, all territorial units were part of the reserve:

- Territorial Command, Allied Land Forces in Zealand (ELK) in Ringsted
  - Host and Support Battalion (Supporting arrival of NATO reinforcements on Zealand)
  - Logistics Support Group East (LSG-E)
    - Supply Battalion
    - Transport Company
    - Medical Battalion
    - Maintenance Battalion
    - Field Replacement Commando
  - 5th Territorial Region (Zealand) in Ringsted
    - 5th Btn Den Sjællandske Livregiment, (Infantry)
    - 5th Region Engineer Company
    - 9 × Homeguard Districts
      - 9 × Homeguard Staff Companies
      - 50 × Area Companies
      - 9 × Homeguard Military Police Companies
  - 6th Territorial Region (Northern Zealand/Copenhagen) in Copenhagen
    - 4th Btn Den Kongelige Livgarde, (Infantry, 6 compagnies) (Northern Zealand/Copenhagen)
    - Guard Company (Vagtkompagniet), Den Kongelige Livgarde, (Infantry) (Copenhagen, city)
    - Mounted Hussar Squadron (Hesteeskadronen), Gardehusarregimentet, (Infantry) (Copenhagen, city)
    - 6th Region Engineer Company
    - 4 × Homeguard Districts (Northern Zealand)
      - 4 × Homeguard Staff Companies
      - 29 × Area Companies
      - 4 × Homeguard Military Police Companies
    - ? × Homeguard Districts (Copenhagen)
      - ? × Homeguard Staff Company
      - ? × Area Company
      - ? × Homeguard Military Police Company
  - 7th Territorial Region (Bornholm)
    - 1 × Homeguard District
      - Homeguard Staff Company
      - 5 × Homeguard Area Companies
      - Homeguard Military Police Company

=== Commander, Air Forces, Baltic Approaches ===
Allied Air Forces Baltic Approaches (AIRBALTAP) was a NATO military formation under Allied Forces Baltic Approaches tasked with providing air support in the BALTAP area of operations. AIRBALTAP commanded all flying units based within its sector and all reinforcements flying into its sector, as well as ground-based radar systems and stations, air defence units and the airfields in its sector. The commander of AIRBALTAP was the commander in chief of the Royal Danish Air Force. AIRBALTAP was formed in 1962 with its area of responsibility covering Germany north of the river Elbe and Denmark with the surrounding seas; however air defence for the German state of Schleswig-Holstein was the responsibility of Second Allied Tactical Air Force

The peacetime headquarters of AIRBALTAP were at Karup in Denmark. AIRBALTAP commanded the Royal Danish Air Force and flying units of the German Luftwaffe and Marine, as well as extensive air defence and radar installations manned by German and Danish personnel.

If needed AIRBALTAP would have been reinforced with units from the US Third (UK based), Eighth (reconnaissance and bombing), Ninth (immediate reinforcements) and Twelfth Air Force (follow on reinforcements), and with Royal Air Force units. At the start of hostilities AIRBALTAP would have had immediately almost 300 combat planes at its disposal. The following units would have come under AIRBALTAP in wartime in 1989:

AIRBALTAP was disbanded in 1993.

==== Wartime structure c. 1989 ====
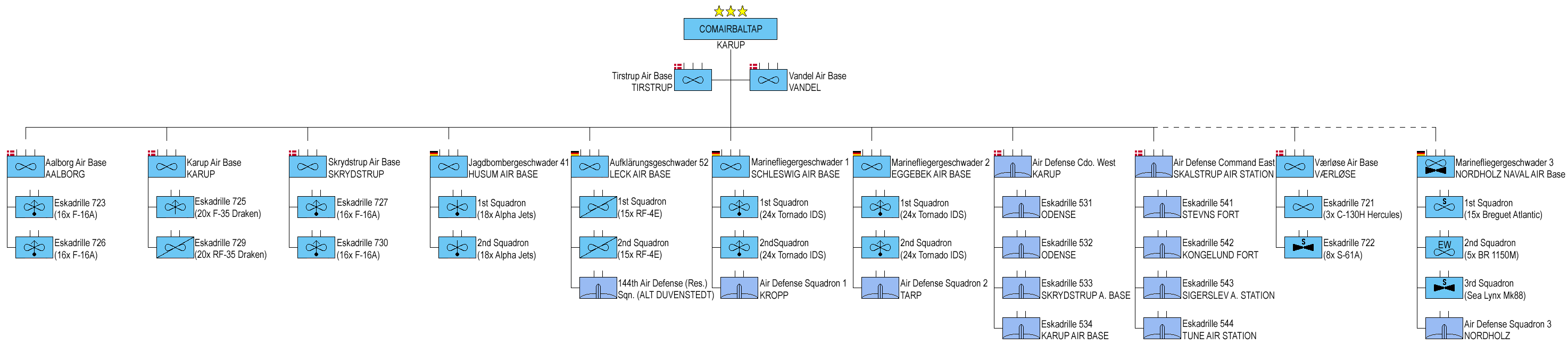
Structure of Air Forces Baltic Approaches in 1989 (click to enlarge)

Royal Danish Air Force bases under AIRBALTAP in 1989
German Luftwaffe and Marine air bases under AIRBALTAP in 1989

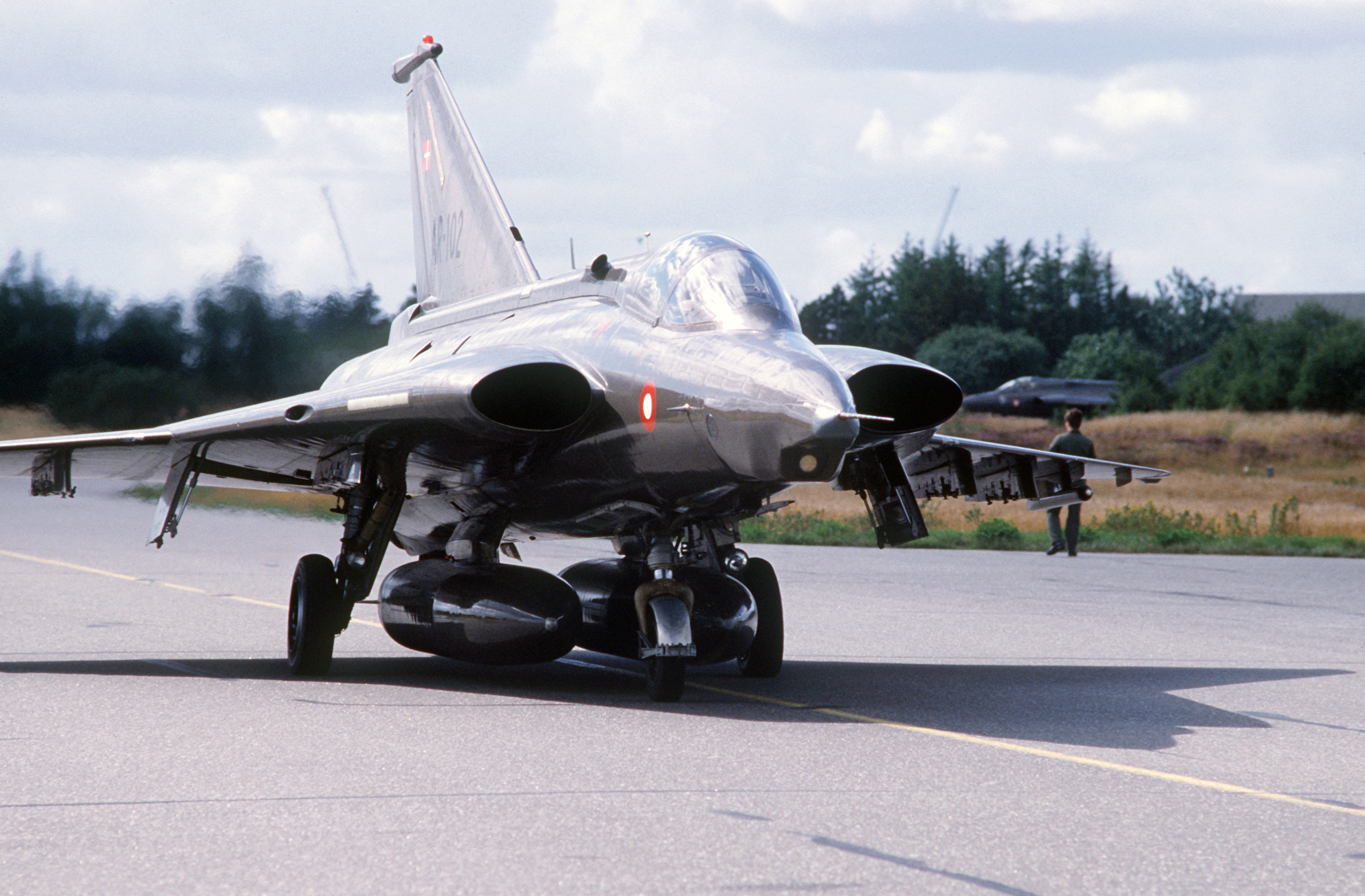
An RF-35 Draken taxiing into takeoff position during Exercise OKSBOEL '86 at Karup Air Base.

- AIRBALTAP in Karup, commanded by a Danish lieutenant general:
  - Royal Danish Air Force
    - Aalborg Air Base
      - Eskadrille 723, 16 × F-16A
      - Eskadrille 726, 16 × F-16A
    - Karup Air Base
      - Eskadrille 725, 20 × F-35 Draken strike fighter, 5 × TF-35 Draken
      - Eskadrille 729, 20 × RF-35 Draken reconnaissance fighter, 5 × TF-35 Draken
    - Tirstrup Air Base
      - Co-located Operating Base to be reinforced by USAF/RAF squadrons
    - Vandel Air Base
      - Co-located Operating Base to be reinforced by USAF/RAF squadrons
      - Army Air Corps (only in peacetime)
    - Skrydstrup Air Base
      - Eskadrille 727, 16 × F-16A
      - Eskadrille 730, 16 × F-16A
    - Værløse Air Base
      - Eskadrille 721, transport aircraft (3 × C-130H Hercules)
      - Eskadrille 722, search and rescue helicopters (8 × S-61A)
    - Air Defence Command East, Skalstrup Air Station
      - Eskadrille 541, Stevns Fort, with 1 × I-Hawk battery (6 × launchers)
      - Eskadrille 542, Kongelund Fort near Aflangshagen Air Station, with 1 × I-Hawk battery (6 × launchers)
      - Eskadrille 543, Sigerslev Air Station, with 1 × I-Hawk battery (6 × launchers)
      - Eskadrille 544, Tune near Skalstrup Air Station, with 1 × I-Hawk battery (6 × launchers)
    - Air Defence Command West, Karup Air Base
      - Eskadrille 531, Odense, with 1 × I-Hawk battery (6 × launchers)
      - Eskadrille 532, Odense, with 1 × I-Hawk battery (6 × launchers)
      - Eskadrille 533, Skrydstrup Air Base, with 1 × I-Hawk battery (6 × launchers)
      - Eskadrille 534, Karup Air Base, with 1 × I-Hawk battery (6 × launchers)
  - Luftwaffe
    - Husum Air Base
      - Jagdbombergeschwader 41, 2 × squadrons with 18 × Alpha Jets each, and 8 × Alpha Jets in reserve
    - Leck Air Base
      - Aufklärungsgeschwader 52, 2 × squadrons with 15 × RF-4E (Reconnaissance)
      - 144th Air Defence Missile Squadron (Reserve), Alt Duvenstedt, with 4 × Roland systems
  - Marine
    - Marinefliegerdivision, Kiel Air Base
      - Schleswig Air Base
        - Marinefliegergeschwader 1, 2 × squadrons with 24 × Tornado IDS each
        - Air Defence Squadron 1, Kropp, with 6 × Roland systems
      - Eggebek Air Base
        - Marinefliegergeschwader 2, 2 × squadrons with 24 × Tornado IDS each
        - Air Defence Squadron 2, Tarp, with 6 × Roland systems
      - Nordholz Airbase, tasked with submarine hunting in the North Sea
        - Marinefliegergeschwader 3, 2 × squadrons with a total of 20 × Breguet Atlantic (15 × maritime patrol and 5 × BR 1150M signals intelligence variant), 1 × squadron with 19 × Sea Lynx Mk88 helicopters for Navy's destroyers and frigates
        - Air Defence Squadron 3, Nordholz, with 6 × Roland systems

=== Commander, Allied Naval Forces Baltic Approaches ===
Allied Naval Forces Baltic Approaches (NAVBALTAP) was located until 1976 in Kiel-Holtenau, and thereafter at Karup. Its commander was a Danish or German vice admiral and had the following deputy commanders:

- Flag Officer Denmark (FOD) in Aarhus, simultaneously the national commander of the Danish fleet. Task Force designation 420.
- Flag Officer Germany (FOG) in Glücksburg, simultaneously the national commander of the German fleet. Task Force designation 500.
- Commander German North Sea Subarea (COMGERNORSEA) in Wilhelmshaven-Sengwarden, simultaneously the German national Commander Naval Forces North Sea (Befehlshaber der Seestreitkräfte der Nordsee (BSN)).

The task of NAVBALTAP was to keep the Warsaw Pact's United Baltic Sea Fleets, consisting of the Soviet Baltic Fleet, Polish Navy and East German Volksmarine bottled up in the Baltic Sea by blocking the Danish Straits and thus ensuring NATOs unchallenged control of the North Sea. To fulfill its mission NAVBALTAP commanded the entire German as well as the ships of the Royal Danish Navy based in Denmark. The ships based in Greenland and the Faroe Islands were under the command of Supreme Allied Commander Atlantic.

==== Flag Officer Denmark ====
Danish naval bases and coastal fortresses under NAVBALTAP in 1989

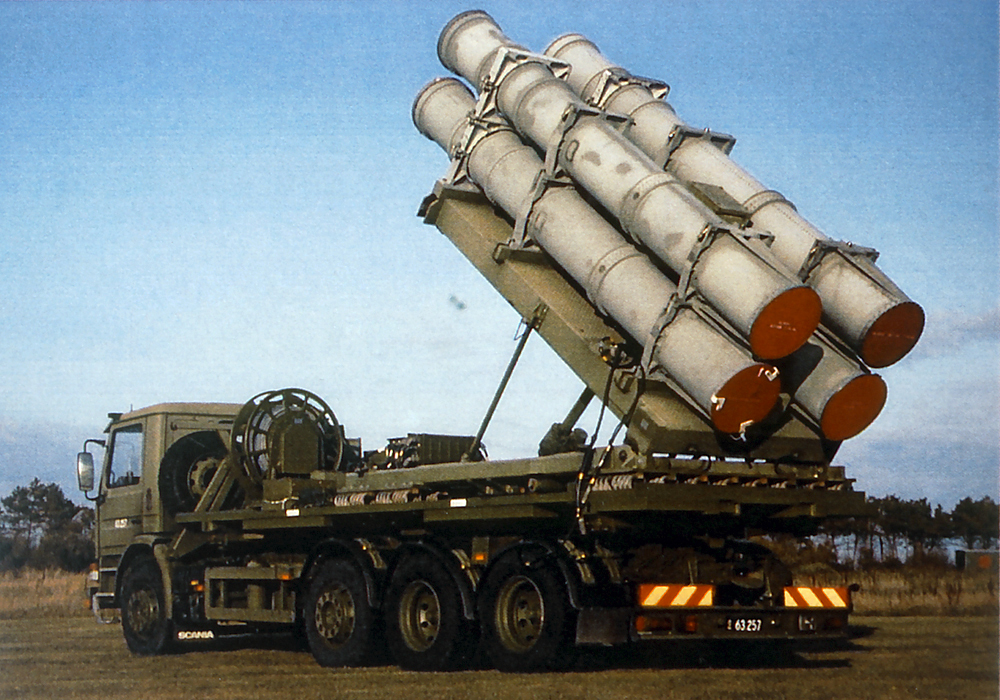
Danish mobile Harpoon anti-ship missile launcher

The Flag Officer Denmark (FOD) commanded the entire Danish home fleet. As the fleet's main tasks were to prevent Warsaw Pact naval forces from passing through the Danish Straits and to prevent amphibious landings on the Danish coast. To fulfill its mission the Danish navy fielded a large number of minelayers and fast attack crafts. The first would have been used to mine all sealanes and potential landings beaches, while the latter would have harassed the enemy fleet with continuous hit and run attacks. Additionally the Danish navy fielded two batteries each with two launchers RGM-84 Harpoon anti-ship missiles mounted on Scania trucks as mobile coastal artillery from 1990 to 2003.

The navy's main bases were

- Holmen Naval Base
- Naval Station Frederikshavn
- Naval Station Korsør.

Minor naval bases were

- Torpedo Station Kongsøre (base of the Frogman Corps and Torpedo Station)
- Marine Station Aarhus (base and HQ of the Danish Fleet Admiral)
- Lyngsbæk Pier (naval mine depot and part of NEPS)
- Marine Station Esbjerg (NATO Reinforce Port and part of NEPS)

The coastal fortification

- Stevnsfortet should control the southern entrance to Øresund
- Langelandsfortet should control the southern entrance to the Great Belt.

Minor naval stations, as part of sea surveillance.

- Marine Station Møn
- Marine Station Gedser
- Marine Station Bornholm

Aerial support was provided by the Danish Naval Air Squadron (Søværnets Flyvetjeneste) based at Værløse Air Base with 8 × Lynx Mk.80 helicopters.

The torpedo boats had a mobile base (MOBA) with approximately 40 trucks. MOBA LOG supplied fuel, ordnance, freshwater and provided repair facilities outside the naval bases. MOBA OPS had mobile radars for tactical surveillance and target acquisition.

At the beginning of 1989 the Danish navy consisted of the following ships.

===== Fregateskadren FGE (Danish Frigate Squadron) 2nd Squadron from April 1992 =====
- Peder Skram-class frigate
  - F352 Peder Skram
  - F353 Herluf Trolle
- Niels Juel-class corvette
  - F354 Niels Juel
  - F355 Olfert Fischer
  - F356 Peter Tordenskiold
- Daphne-class (based on the British Ford-class seaward defence craft)
  - P530 Daphne
  - P531 Dryaden
  - P533 Havfruen
  - P534 Najaden
  - P535 Nymfen
  - P536 Neptun decommissioned October 30, 1989
  - P537 Ran
  - P538 Rota decommissioned October 31, 1989

===== Torpedobådseskadren TBE (Danish Torpedo Boat Squadron) 4th Squadron from April 1992 =====
- Søløven-class fast torpedo boat
  - P510 Søløven
  - P511 Søridderen
  - P512 Søbjørnen
  - P513 Søhesten
  - P514 Søhunden
  - P515 Søulven
- Willemoes-class fast missile-torpedo boats
  - P540 Bille
  - P541 Bredal
  - P542 Hammer
  - P543 Huitfeldt
  - P544 Krieger
  - P545 Norby
  - P546 Rodsteen
  - P547 Sehested
  - P548 Suenson
  - P549 Willemoes
- Faxe-klassen oiler
  - A568 Rimfaxe
  - A569 Skinfaxe
- Mobile base for the torpedo boats (MOBA)

===== Ubådseskadren UBE (Danish Submarine Squadron) 5th Squadron from April 1992 =====
- Narwhal-class submarine
  - S320 Narhvalen
  - S321 Nordkaperen
- Kobben-class submarine
  - S322 Tumleren, bought from Norway, commissioned on October 20, 1989
- Danish Delfinen-class submarine
  - S327 Spækhuggeren, decommissioned July 31, 1989
  - S329 Springeren

===== Mineskibseskadren MSE (Danish Mine Ship Squadron) 3rd Squadron from April 1992 =====
- Lindormen-class cable minelayer
  - N43 Lindormen
  - N44 Lossen
- Falster-class minelayer
  - N80 Falster
  - N81 Fyen
  - N82 Møen
  - N83 Sjælland
- Sund-class minesweepers
  - M572 Alssund decommissioned November 30, 1989
  - M573 Egernsund decommissioned December 31, 1989
  - M574 Grønsund
  - M575 Guldborgsund
  - M577 Ulvsund refitted as a minehunter, decommissioned December 31, 1989
  - M578 Vilsund

===== Inspektionsskibseskadren ISE (Danish Fishery Protection Squadron) 1st Squadron from April 1992 =====
- Hvidbjørnen-class offshore patrol frigate
  - F348 Hvidbjørnen
  - F349 Vædderen
  - F350 Ingolf
  - F351 Fylla
- Beskytteren-class (an improved Hvidbjørnen-class) offshore patrol frigate
  - F340 Beskytteren
- Agdlek-class arctic patrol cutter
  - Y386 Agdlek
  - Y387 Agpa
  - Y388 Tulugaq

===== Others =====
- Flyvefisken-class patrol vessel – 2 more fitting out, replacing the Søløven, Daphne and Sund classes
  - P550 Flyvefisken
- Barsø-class naval patrol cutter
  - Y300 Barsø
  - Y301 Drejø
  - Y302 Romsø
  - Y303 Samsø
  - Y304 Thurø
  - Y305 Vejrø
  - Y306 Farø
  - Y307 Læsø
  - Y308 Rømø

Support ships:

- A559 Sleipner, transport ship

==== Marinehjemmeværnet MHV Naval Home Guard ====
- MH-90-class home guard cutters
  - MHV 90 Bopa
  - MHV 91 Brigaden
  - MHV 92 Holger Danske
  - MHV 93 Hvidsten
  - MHV 94 Ringen
  - MHV 95 Speditøren

==== Flag Officer Germany ====
German naval bases in the Baltic Sea 1989

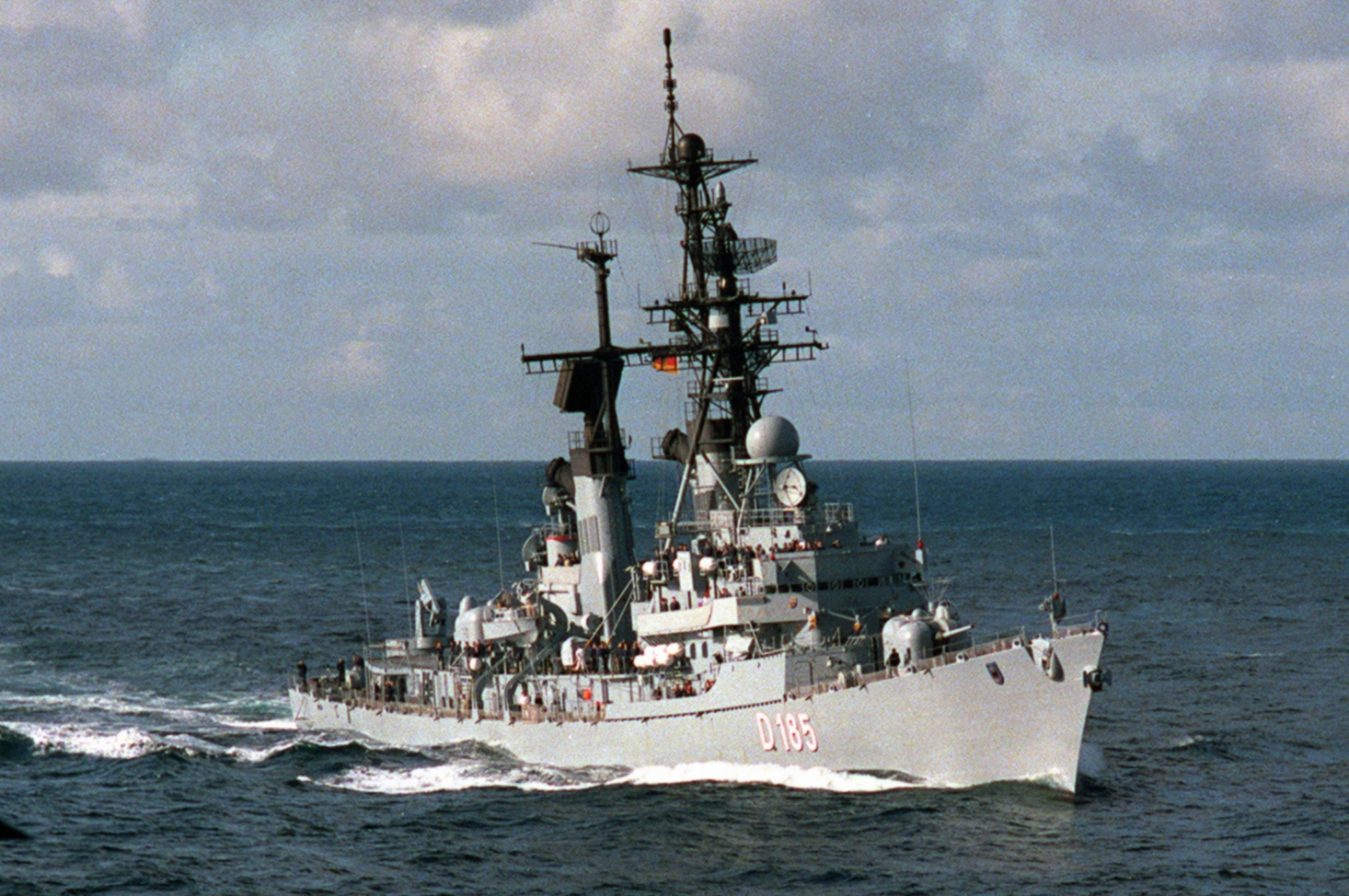
Destroyer D185 Lütjens underway during exercise Team Work '88.

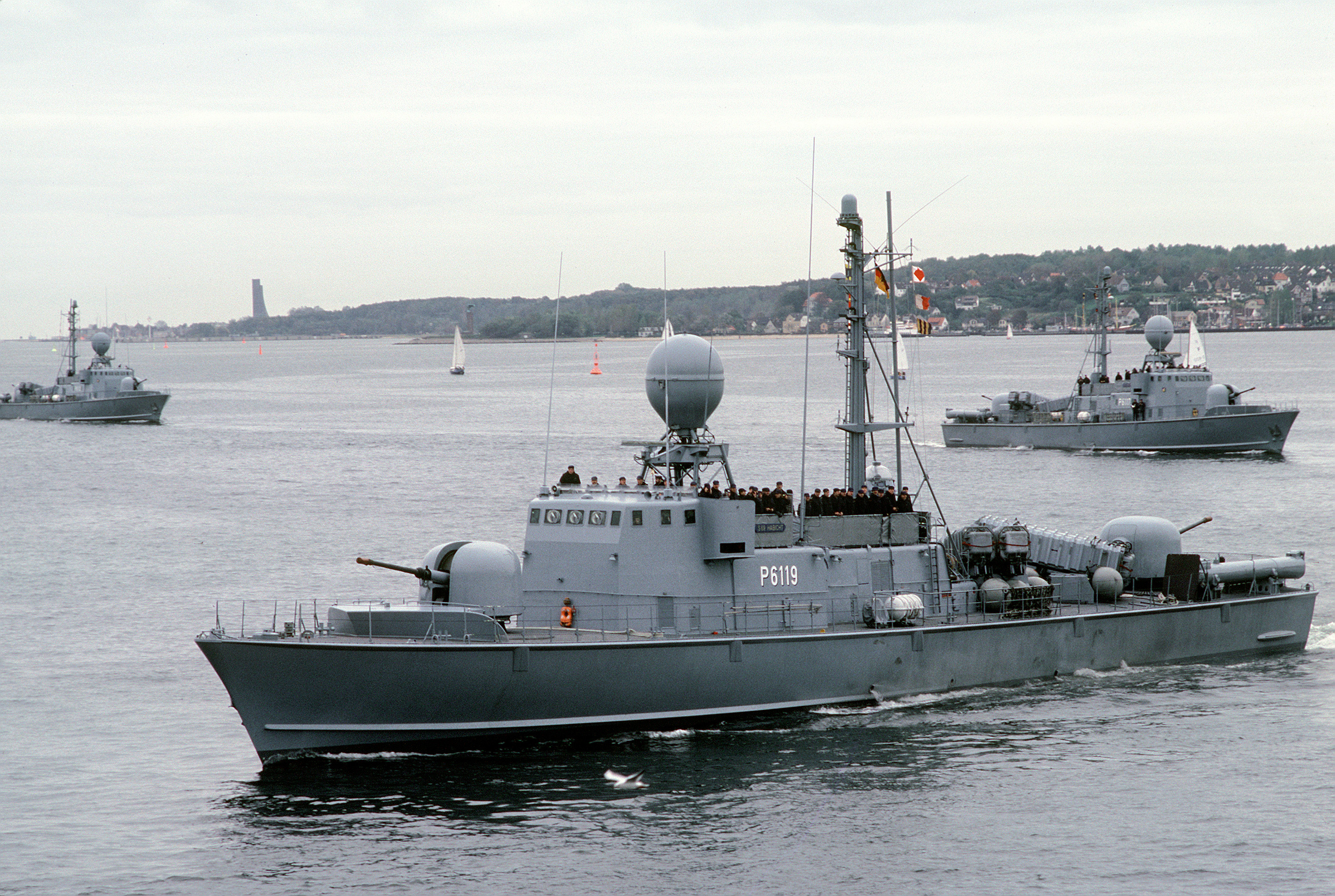
Albatros-class fast attack crafts in Kiel in 1985

The Flag Officer Germany (FOG) was the commanding vice admiral of the West-German Navy's Fleet Command. In peacetime he commanded all German naval units in the North and Baltic Sea. In case of war the command of German units in the North Sea would pass to the Commander German North Sea Subarea. Fleet Command was based during peacetime in Glücksburg, but would have moved to an underground command center in Glücksburg-Meierwik in case of war.

The German naval forces in the Baltic Sea had the task to prevent Warsaw Pact naval forces from passing through the Danish Straits and to prevent amphibious landings on the German coast. To fulfill its mission the German navy fielded like the Danish navy a large number of minelayers and fast attack crafts. All German submarines were based in the Baltic Sea and tasked with mining enemy harbors and sinking enemy supply ships far from German waters. The main bases in the Baltic Sea were Naval Base Kiel, Naval Base Kiel-Holtenau, Naval Base Flensburg, Naval Base Flensburg-Mürwik, Naval Base Olpenitz, Neustadt Naval Base and Naval Base Eckernförde. At the beginning of 1989 the Flag Officer Germany would have commanded the following ships. The peacetime administrative flotilla commands in Wilhelmshaven and Cuxhaven would have been removed from the chain of command in times of war.

- Fleet Command in Glücksburg
  - Destroyer Flotilla in Wilhelmshaven
    - 1st Destroyer Squadron in Kiel with Lütjens-class destroyers
      - D185 Lütjens
      - D186 Mölders
      - D187 Rommel
    - Fleet Service Squadron in Flensburg-Mürwik with Thetis-class submarine chasers and Oste-class SIGINT/ELINT ships
      - A1449 Hans Bürkner, command and control ship for the Thetis-class submarine chasers
      - P6052 Thetis
      - P6053 Hermes
      - P6054 Najade
      - P6055 Triton
      - P6056 Theseus
      - A50 Alster, commissioned October 1989
      - A52 Oste
      - A53 Oker
  - Fast attack craft Flotilla in Flensburg-Mürwik
    - 2nd Fast Attack Craft Squadron in Olpenitz with Albatros-class fast attack craft
      - P6111 Albatros
      - P6112 Falke
      - P6113 Geier
      - P6114 Bussard
      - P6115 Sperber
      - P6116 Greif
      - P6117 Kondor
      - P6118 Seeadler
      - P6119 Habicht
      - P6120 Kormoran
      - A69 Donau, 401C-class supply and support tender
    - 3rd Fast Attack Craft Squadron in Flensburg-Mürwik with Tiger-class fast attack craft
      - P6141 Tiger
      - P6142 Iltis
      - P6143 Luchs
      - P6144 Marder
      - P6145 Leopard
      - P6146 Fuchs
      - P6147 Jaguar
      - P6148 Löwe
      - P6149 Wolf
      - P6150 Panther
      - A58 Rhein, 401C-class supply and support tender
    - 5th Fast Attack Craft Squadron in Olpenitz with Tiger-class fast attack craft
      - P6151 Häher
      - P6152 Storch
      - P6153 Pelikan
      - P6154 Elster
      - P6155 Alk
      - P6156 Dommel
      - P6157 Weihe
      - P6158 Pinguin
      - P6159 Reiher
      - P6160 Kranich
      - A63 Main, 401C-class supply and support tender
    - 7th Fast Attack Craft Squadron in Kiel with Gepard-class fast attack craft
      - P6121 Gepard
      - P6122 Puma
      - P6123 Hermelin
      - P6124 Nerz
      - P6125 Zobel
      - P6126 Frettchen
      - P6127 Dachs
      - P6128 Ozelot
      - P6129 Wiesel
      - P6130 Hyäne
      - A61 Elbe, 401D-class supply and support tender
      - A66 Neckar, 401B-class supply and support tender, decommissioned November 1989
  - Mine Countermeasures Flotilla in Wilhelmshaven
    - Mine Diver Company in Eckernförde
    - 1st Minesweeping Squadron in Flensburg with Schütze-class fast minesweepers
      - M1051 Castor
      - M1054 Pollux
      - M1055 Sirius
      - M1056 Rigel
      - M1057 Regulus
      - M1058 Mars
      - M1059 Spica
      - M1060 Skorpion
      - M1062 Schütze
      - M1063 Waage
      - A1437 Sachsenwald, 762-class naval mine transport ship
      - A1438 Steigerwald, 762-class naval mine transport ship
    - 3rd Minesweeping Squadron in Kiel with Ariadne-class coastal minesweepers
      - M2650 Ariadne
      - M2651 Freya
      - M2652 Vineta
      - M2653 Hertha
      - M2654 Nymphe
      - M2655 Nixe
      - M2656 Amazone
      - M2657 Gazelle
    - 5th Minesweeping Squadron in Olpenitz, between 1988 and 1991 the squadron's Schütze-class fast minesweepers were replaced with Hameln-class fast minesweepers
      - M1064 Deneb, decommissioned September 1989
      - M1065 Jupiter, decommissioned September 1989
      - M1093 Neptun
      - M1094 Widder, decommissioned July 1989
      - M1096 Fische, decommissioned April 1989
      - M1092 Hameln, commissioned June 1989
      - M1095 Überherrn, commissioned September 1989
      - M1097 Laboe, commissioned December 1989
      - A67 Mosel, 402A-class supply and support tender
    - 7th Minesweeping Squadron in Neustadt with Frauenlob-class minesweepers
      - M2658 Frauenlob
      - M2659 Nautilus
      - M2660 Gefion
      - M2661 Medusa
      - M2662 Undine
      - M2663 Minerva
      - M2664 Diana
      - M2665 Loreley
      - M2666 Atlantis
      - M2667 Acheron
  - Submarine Flotilla in Kiel
    - 1st Submarine Squadron in Kiel with Type 205 and Type 206 submarines
      - S170 / U21
      - S176 / U27
      - S180 / U1 (Type 205)
      - S181 / U2 (Type 205)
      - S188 / U9 (Type 205)
      - S189 / U10 (Type 205)
      - S190 / U11 (Type 205A)
      - S191 / U12 (Type 205B)
      - S192 / U13
      - S193 / U14
      - S198 / U19
      - S199 / U20
      - A55 Lahn, 403B-class supply and support tender
    - 3rd Submarine Squadron in Eckernförde with Type 206 submarines
      - S171 / U22
      - S172 / U23
      - S173 / U24
      - S174 / U25
      - S175 / U26
      - S177 / U28
      - S178 / U29
      - S179 / U30
      - S194 / U15
      - S195 / U16
      - S196 / U17
      - S197 / U18
      - A56 Lech, 403B-class supply and support tender, decommissioned June 1989
  - Supply Flotilla in Cuxhaven
    - 1st Supply Squadron in Kiel, in wartime six additional transport ships and a fuel ship would be activated from the Navy's reserve.
      - Naval Base Kiel
        - A1407 Wittensee, 763-class fuel transport ship
        - A1412 Coburg, 701-class supply ship
        - A1417 Offenburg, 701A-class supply ship
        - A1442 Spessart, 704A-class fuel transport ship
        - A1452 Spiekeroog, 722B-class ocean going tug
      - Naval Base Flensburg-Mürwik
        - A1424 Walchensee, 703-class fuel transport ship
        - A1428 Harz, 766-class fuel transport ship
        - A1435 Westerwald, 760-class ammunition transport ship
      - Naval Base Olpenitz
        - A1411 Lüneburg, 701A-class supply ship
        - A1415 Saarburg, 701C-class supply ship
        - A1418 Meersburg, 701C-class supply ship
        - A1425 Ammersee, 703-class fuel transport ship
        - A1455 Norderney, 722B-class ocean going tug
        - Y847 Odin, maintenance ship
      - Neustadt Naval Base
        - A1458 Fehmarn, 720B-class salvage tug
  - Amphibious Group in Kiel
    - Combat Swimmers Company in Eckernförde
    - Beachmaster Company in Eckernförde with 521-class LCMs
      - L780 Hummer
      - L782 Krabbe
      - L783 Auster
      - L784 Muschel
      - L785 Koralle
      - L788 Butt (Barbe-class utility landing craft)
      - L789 Brasse (Barbe-class utility landing craft)
    - Landing Craft Group in Kiel with Barbe-class utility landing crafts
      - L760 Flunder
      - L761 Karpfen
      - L762 Lachs
      - L763 Plötze
      - L764 Rochen
      - L765 Schlei
      - L766 Stör
      - L767 Tümmler
      - L768 Wels
      - L769 Zander
      - L790 Barbe
      - L791 Delphin
      - L792 Dorsch
      - L793 Felchen
      - L794 Forelle
      - L796 Makrele
      - L797 Muräne

==== Commander German North Sea Subarea ====
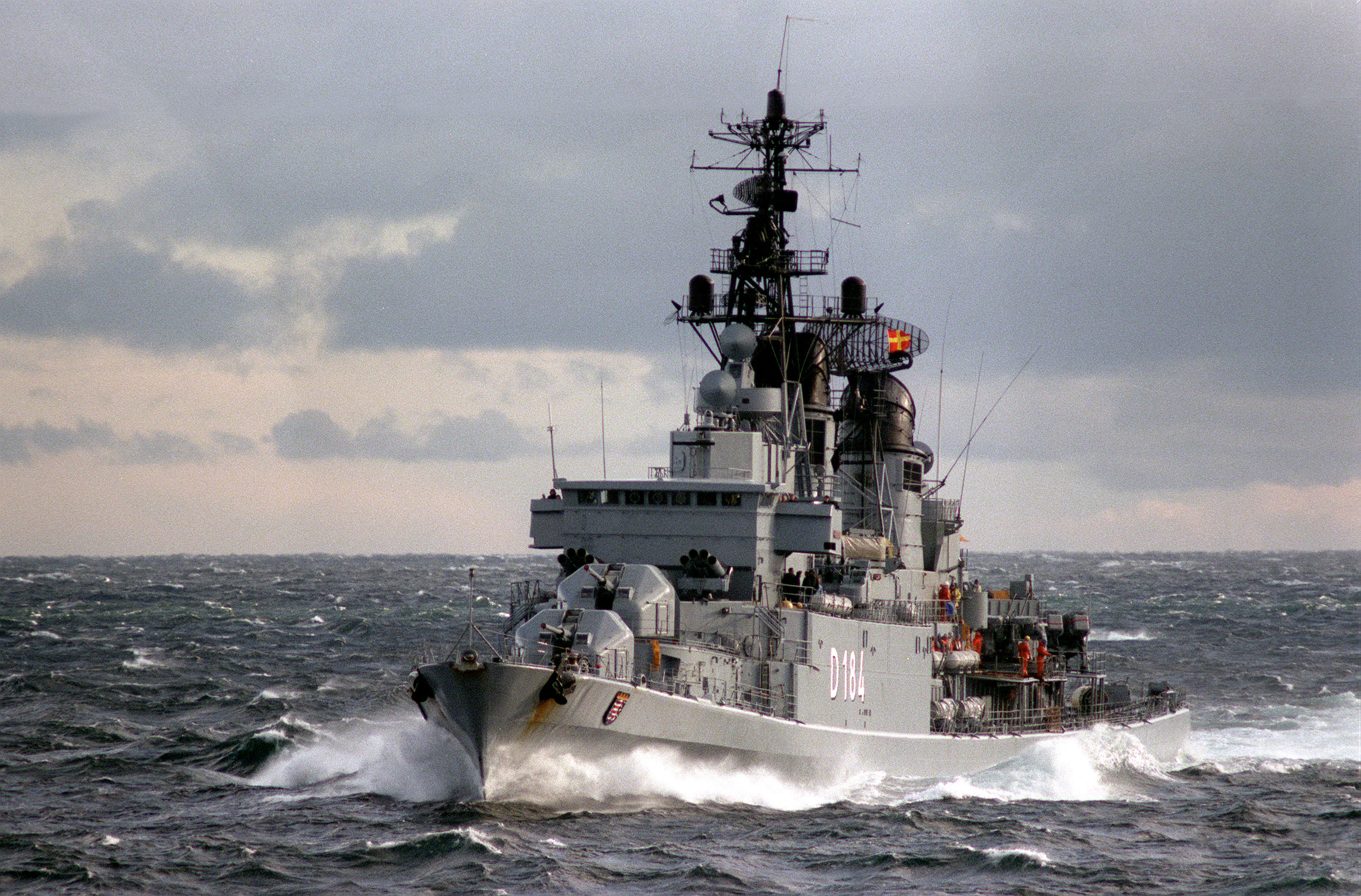
Hamburg-class destroyer D184 Hessen during NATO exercise Northern Wedding '86.

The Commander German North Sea Subarea (GERNORSEA) was the commanding Flottillenadmiral (equivalent to a US Navy Rear admiral (Lower Half)) of the West-German Navy's fleet in the North Sea. In peacetime he was subordinate to the vice admiral commanding West-German Navy's Fleet Command, but in case of war he command a parallel command under NAVBALTAP. In peacetime the command was based in Wilhelmshaven, but would have moved to an underground command center in Wilhelmshaven-Sengwarden in case of war.

While German naval forces in Baltic Sea were tasked with preventing Warsaw Pact naval forces from passing through the Danish Straits, the North Sea fleet was to patrol the German Bight and protect allied reinforcements and shipping heading for German ports. To GERNORSEA's East Allied Command Channel's BENECHAN command was tasked with patrolling the Western half of the Southern North Sea, while to North Allied Forces Northern Europe's SONOR command was patrolling the Southern Norwegian coast. Unlike in the Baltic Sea most vessels of GERNORSEA were destroyers and frigates. The main bases in the North Sea were Naval Base Wilhelmshaven and Naval Base Cuxhaven.

At the beginning of 1989 the Commander German North Sea Subarea would have commanded the following ships in wartime:

- Commander German North Sea Subarea in Sengwarden
  - Destroyer Flotilla in Wilhelmshaven
    - 2nd Destroyer Squadron in Wilhelmshaven with Hamburg-class destroyers
      - D181 Hamburg
      - D182 Schleswig-Holstein
      - D183 Bayern
      - D184 Hessen
    - 2nd Frigate Squadron in Wilhelmshaven, between 1988 and 1990 the squadron replaced its Köln-class frigates with Bremen-class frigates
      - F211 Köln
      - F212 Karlsruhe
      - F213 Augsburg, commissioned October 1989
      - F214 Lübeck, fitting out, commissioned March 1990
      - F225 Braunschweig, last Köln-class frigate in service, decommissioned July 1989
    - 4th Frigate Squadron in Wilhelmshaven with Bremen-class frigates
      - F207 Bremen
      - F208 Niedersachsen
      - F209 Rheinland-Pfalz
      - F210 Emden
  - Mine Countermeasures Flotilla in Wilhelmshaven
    - 4th Minesweeping Squadron in Wilhelmshaven with Lindau-class minehunters
      - M1070 Göttingen
      - M1071 Koblenz
      - M1072 Lindau
      - M1074 Tübingen
      - M1075 Wetzlar
      - M1077 Weilheim
      - M1078 Cuxhaven
      - M1080 Marburg
      - M1084 Flensburg
      - M1085 Minden
      - M1086 Fulda
      - M1087 Völklingen
    - 6th Minesweeping Squadron in Wilhelmshaven with 351-class minesweepers (improved Lindau-class minesweepers)
      - M1073 Schleswig
      - M1076 Paderborn
      - M1079 Düren
      - M1081 Konstanz
      - M1082 Wolfsburg
      - M1083 Ulm
      - A68 Werra, 401A-class supply and support tender
      - A1410 Walther Von Ledebur, mine diver support vessel
  - Supply Flotilla in Cuxhaven
    - 2nd Supply Squadron in Wilhelmshaven, in wartime two additional two fuel transport ships and nine hospital ships would be activated from the Navy's reserve.
      - A1413 Freiburg, 701E-class supply ship
      - A1414 Glücksburg, 701C-class supply ship
      - A1416 Nienburg, 701A-class supply ship
      - A1426 Tegernsee, 703-class fuel transport ship
      - A1427 Westensee, 703-class fuel transport ship
      - A1429 Eifel, 766-class fuel transport ship
      - A1436 Odenwald, 760-class ammunition transport ship
      - A1443 Rhön, 704A-class fuel transport ship
      - A1451 Wangerooge, 722C-class ocean going tug
      - A1457 Helgoland, 720A-class salvage tug
      - Y848 Wotan, maintenance ship

=== 1993 to 2002 ===
On 1 October 1993, a restructuring took effect, which took into account the changed military situation in the Baltic Sea. Whilst the two land forces commands remained in place, the two headquarters of the naval and air forces were deactivated. The Interim Combined Air Operations Centre 1 (ICAOC 1) in Karup took the place of COMAIRBALTAP. The two national naval commanders were placed directly under COMBALTAP as Admiral Danish Fleet (AdmDanFleet) and Commander German Fleet (COMGERFLEET).

== Commanders ==
No.	Portrait	Name (born–died)	Term of office			Defence branch	Ref.
No.	Portrait	Name (born–died)	Took office	Left office	Time in office	Defence branch	Ref.
1		(act.) Lieutenant general Tage Andersen (?–?)	15 July 1962	31 October 1963	1 year, 108 days	Air force	
2		(act.) Lieutenant general Eigil Wolff (1914–1983)	1 November 1963	31 December 1969	6 years, 60 days	Army	
3		(act.) Vice admiral Adam Helms (1912–2011)	1 January 1970	31 December 1975	5 years, 364 days	Navy	
4		(act.) Lieutenant general Christian Vegger (1915–1992)	1 January 1976	1980	3–4 years	Army	
5		(act.) Lieutenant general Otto K. Lind (1920–2000)	1980	1984	3–4 years	Army	
6		(act.) Lieutenant general Niels-Aage Rye-Andersen (1922–2002)	1984	1987	2–3 years	Army	
7		(act.) Lieutenant general Poul Thorsen (?–?)	1987	1988	0–1 years	Air force	
8		(act.) Lieutenant general Bent E. Amled (1925–2010)	1988	1990	1–2 years	Air force	
9		(act.) Lieutenant general M. V. Hansen (?–?)	1990	1993	2–3 years	Air force	
10		(act.) Lieutenant general Kjeld Hillingsø (born 1935)	1993	1995	1–2 years	Army	
11		(act.) Vice admiral Knud Borck (1940–2011)	1995	2000	4–5 years	Navy	
12		(act.) Lieutenant general Ove Høegh-Guldberg Hoff (born 1942)	2000	2002	1–2 years	Army	

== Sources ==
- Peter Monte, Die Rolle der Marine der Bundesrepublik Deutschland in der Verteidigungsplanung für Mittel- und Nordeuropa von den 50er Jahren bis zur Wende 1989/90; in: Werner Rahn (Hrsg.), Deutsche Marinen im Wandel, S. 565 ff.. München 2005. ISBN 3-486-57674-7
- Norbert Rath; Headquarter Allied Forces Baltic Approaches (HQ BALTAP); in Marineforum 4–1997, S. 3ff.

== Literature ==
- Thomas-Durell Young, Command in NATO After the Cold War: Alliance, National and Multinational Considerations
