= Peder Skram (disambiguation) =

Peder Skram, a 16th-century Danish admiral.

Peder Skram may also refer to:

- Danish ironclad Peder Skram, a Danish armored frigate
- Peder Skram class frigate, a Danish frigate class
  - Peder Skram (F 352), a Danish frigate
- Peder Skram (coastal defence ship), a coastal battleship of Herluf Trolle class
