= HDMS Herluf Trolle =

At least two ships of the Royal Danish Navy have been named Herluf Trolle:

- HDMS Herluf Trolle (1899), a coastal defense ship built in the late 1890s and early 1900s
- HDMS Herluf Trolle (F353), a frigate built in the 1960s
