= Otto K. Lind =

Otto K. Lind S.K.
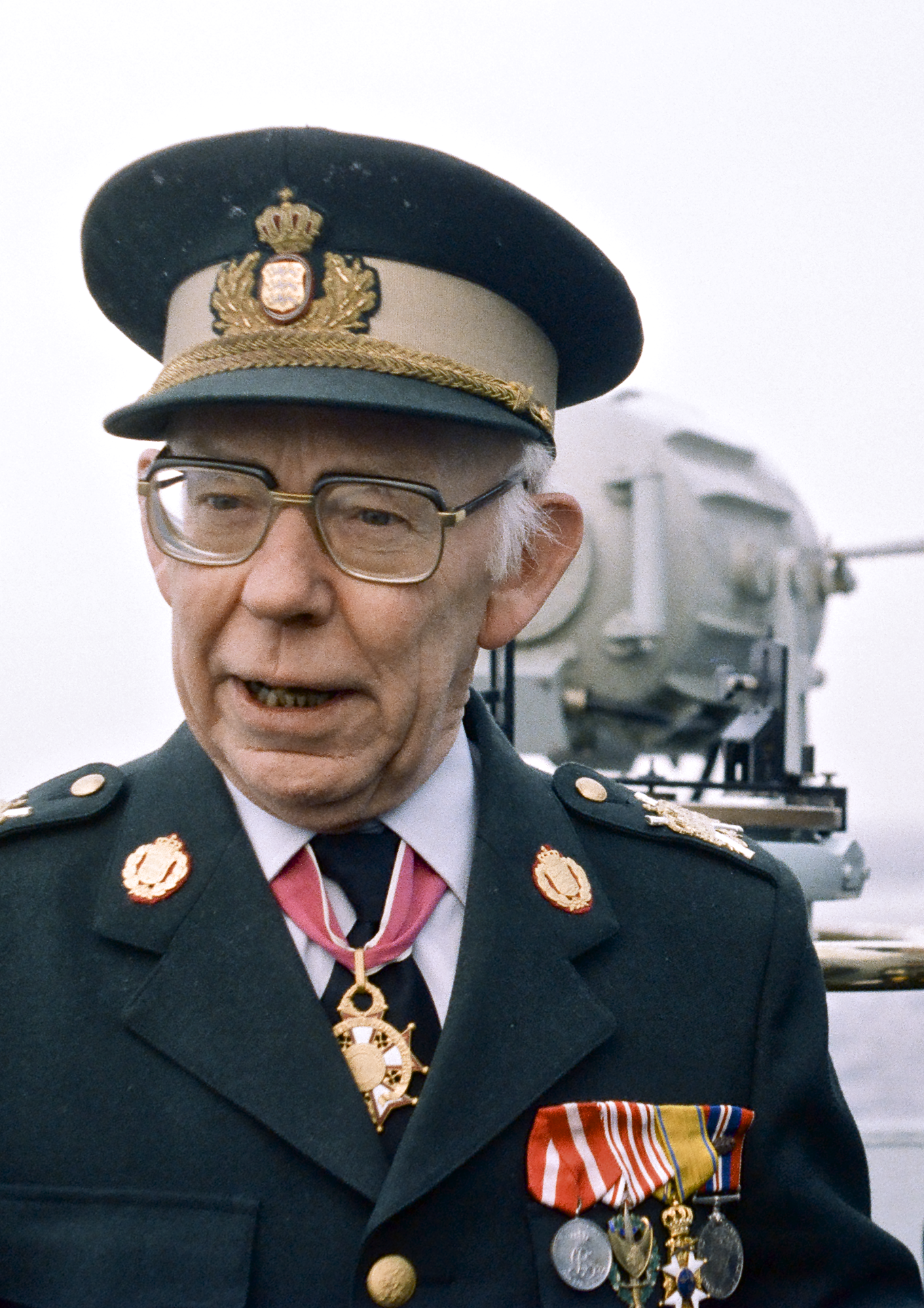
- Born: Otto Katharus Lind; 28 November 1920; Copenhagen
- Died: 8 September 2000 (aged 79); Viborg, Denmark
- Burial place: Almind Kirkegård, Viborg
- Military career
- Allegiance: Denmark
- Branch: Royal Danish Army
- Service years: 1943-1985
- Rank: General
- Commands: Chief of BALTAP (1980–1984); Chief of Defence (1984–85)

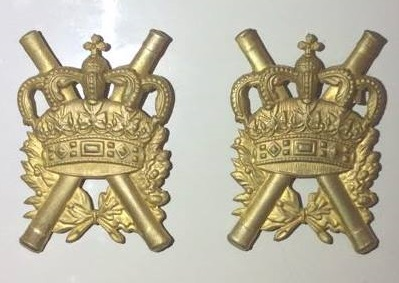
The insignia used by Otto K. Lind

Otto K. Lind (28 November 1920 – 8 September 2000) was a Danish resistance fighter and later general, who served as Chief of Defence.

Lind completed his training at the Royal Danish Military Academy in 1943, at the rank of First Lieutenant shortly before the dissolution of armed forces. He then started working for the resistance movement and collecting intelligence. In 1944, he was arrested in Nørre Nissum, where he was gathering intelligence on the German fortifications. He was taken by the Gestapo to Århus, where he was subjugated to extreme torture. He was later sent to Frøslev Prison Camp, where he spent the remainder of the war.

After the war, he served as lieutenant colonel at Dronningens Livregiment. In 1974, he became major general and chief for the Defence's Operation Staff before becoming chief of BALTAP, in 1980. When Knud Jørgensen retired as Chief of Defence in 1984, Lind was selected as the new Chief, and served a year before Lind had to retire in 1985.

He died in 2000.

== Awards and decorations ==
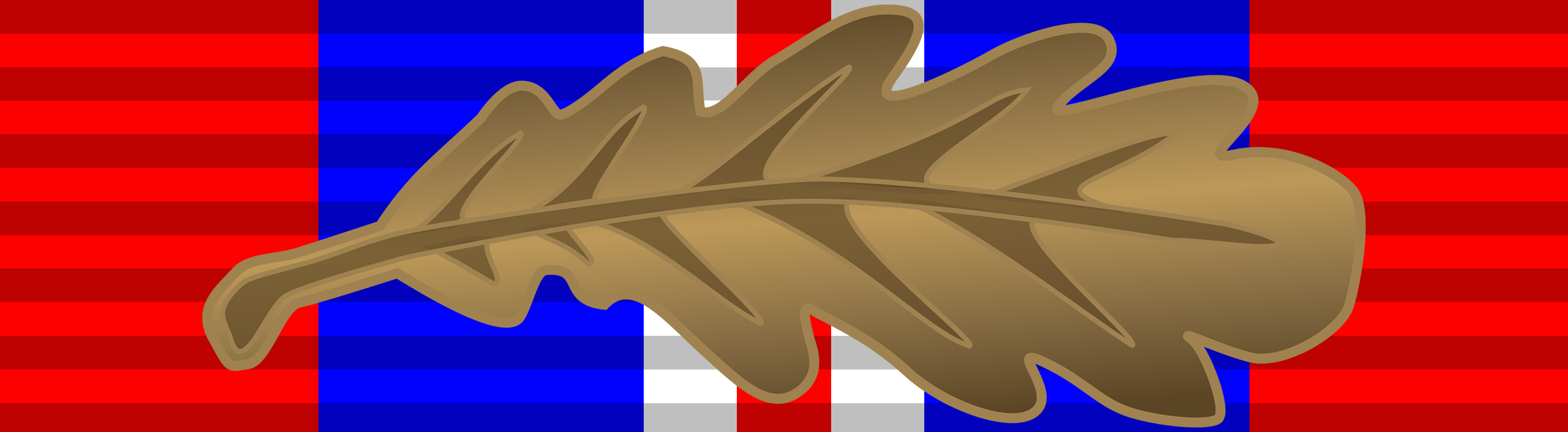
Grand Cross of the Order of the Dannebrog
25 Years of Good Service
Badge of Honor of the Reserve Officers Association of Denmark
Commander of Legion of Merit
Order of the Sword, Sweden
War Medal 1939-1945, with Mentioned in dispatches

Military offices
Preceded by Knud Jørgensen	Chief of Defence (Denmark); 1984-1985	Succeeded by Sven Eigil Thiede
