= HDMS Herluf Trolle (F353) =

Peder Skram-class frigate

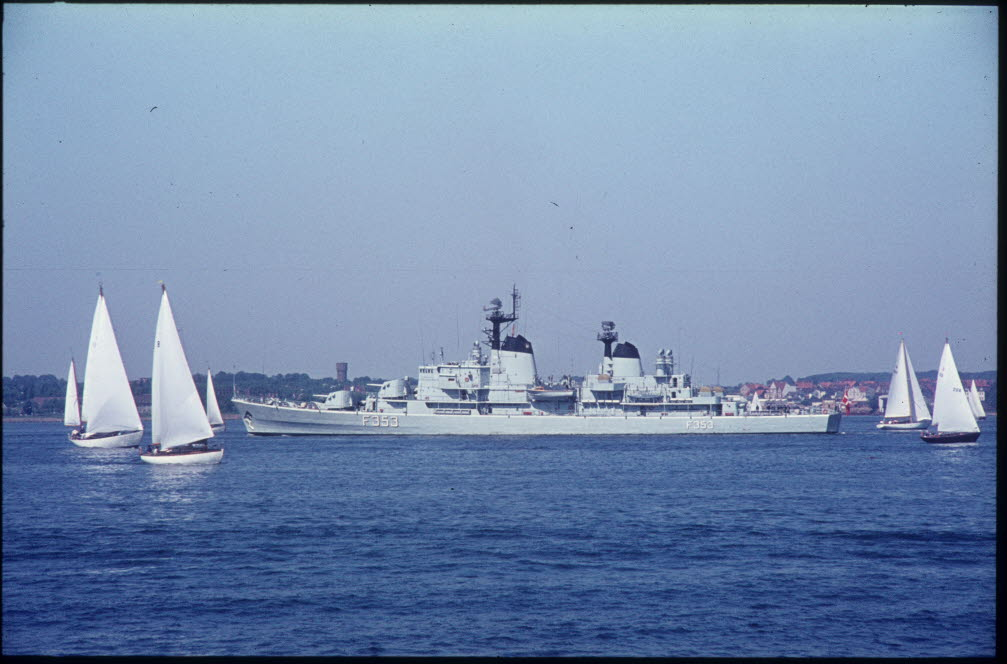
- HDMS Herluf Trolle at Kiel on 20 June 1970

History

Denmark
- Name: Herluf Trolle
- Namesake: Herluf Trolle
- Builder: Helsingør Skibsværft, Elsinore
- Laid down: 18 December 1964
- Launched: 8 September 1965
- Commissioned: 16 April 1967
- Decommissioned: 5 July 1990
- Identification: Callsign: OUEQ; Pennant number: F353
- Fate: Scrapped in 1995

General characteristics
- Class & type: Peder Skram-class frigate
- Displacement: 2,755 t (2,711 long tons) full load
- Length: 112.65 m (369 ft 7 in)
- Beam: 12.25 m (40 ft 2 in)
- Draught: 5.2 m (17 ft 1 in)
- Propulsion: 2 × 22,000 shp (16,405 kW) gas turbines (modified Pratt & Whitney JT4); 2 × 2,400 shp (1,790 kW) General Motors diesel engines
- Speed: 30 knots (35 mph; 56 km/h)
- Range: 7,200 nmi (13,300 km) at 15 kn (17 mph; 28 km/h)
- Complement: 207
- Armament: Up to 1977 : 4 × 127 mm cannon (US 5"/38 caliber gun); 4 × 40 mm L/70 cannon (Bofors 40 mm); Depth charges; 4 × 533 mm torpedoes; From 1978 : 2 × 127 mm cannon (US 5"/38 caliber gun); 4 × 40 mm L/70 cannon (Bofors 40 mm); Depth charges; 4 × 533 mm torpedoes; 8 × Sea Sparrow SAMs; 8 × Harpoon SSMs

HDMS Herluf Trolle (F353) was a Peder Skram-class frigate in the Royal Danish Navy which was in use until 1990. The ship was named after Herluf Trolle, a 15th-century Danish admiral.

== Construction and career ==
She was laid down on 18 December 1964 and launched on 8 September 1965 by Helsingør Skinsværft, Elsinore. Commissioned on 16 April 1967.

Herluf Trolle was an innovative design using a hybrid propulsion system, a combined gas turbine and diesel approach (CODOG). Herluf Trolle underwent significant refit in 1970 and a midlife update 1977–78.

During Kiel Week on 20 June 1970, she participated with multiple other German vessels.

She suffered a serious engine room fire in 1982 and was repaired by 1983.

Herluf Trolle was placed in reserve in 1987, decommissioned in 1990 and sold for auction in 1992. She was scrapped in Belgium in 1995.

== Gallery ==
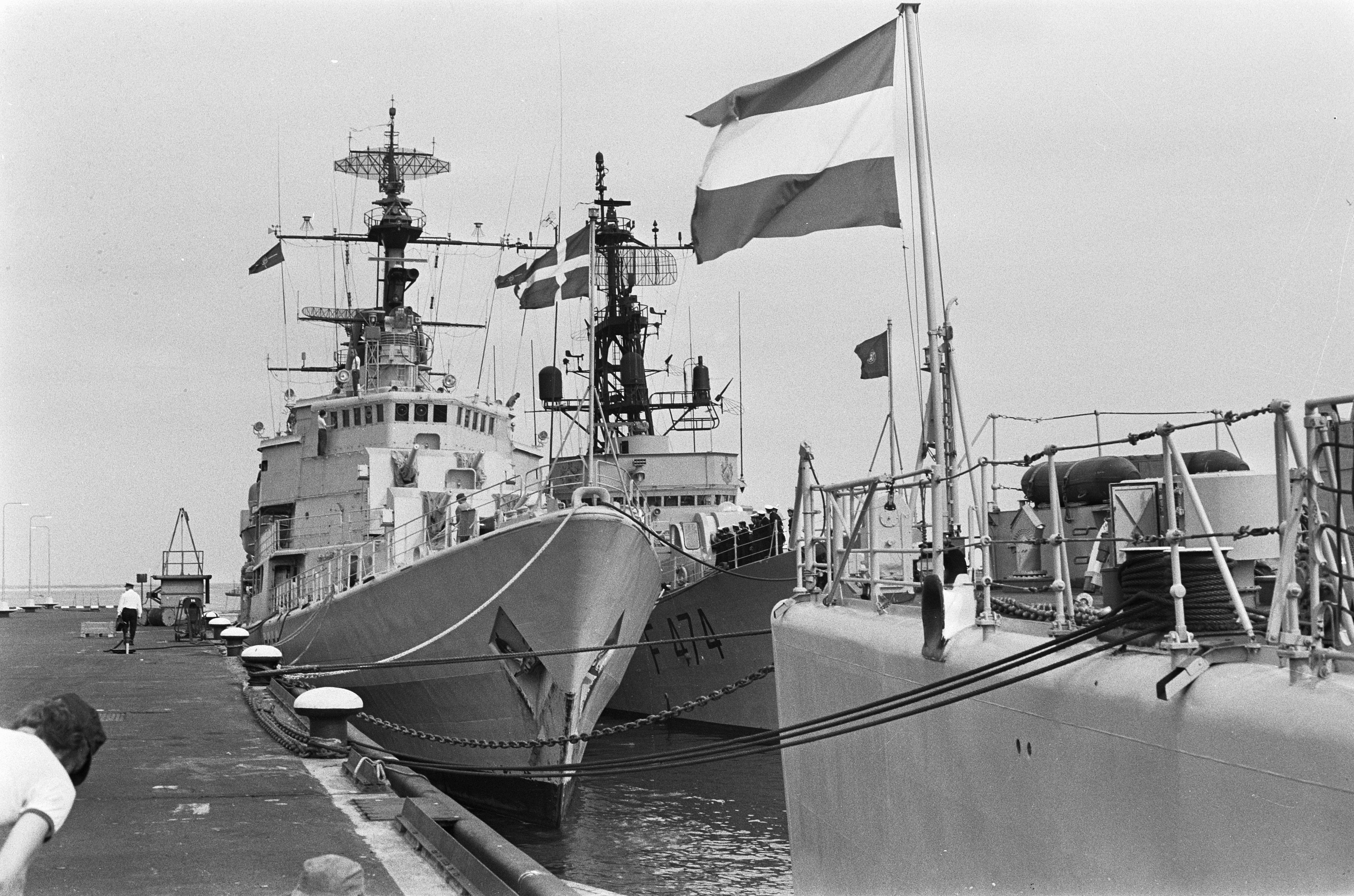
HDMS Herluf Trolle alongside NRP Almirante Magalhães Correia at Den Helder on 24 August 1973.

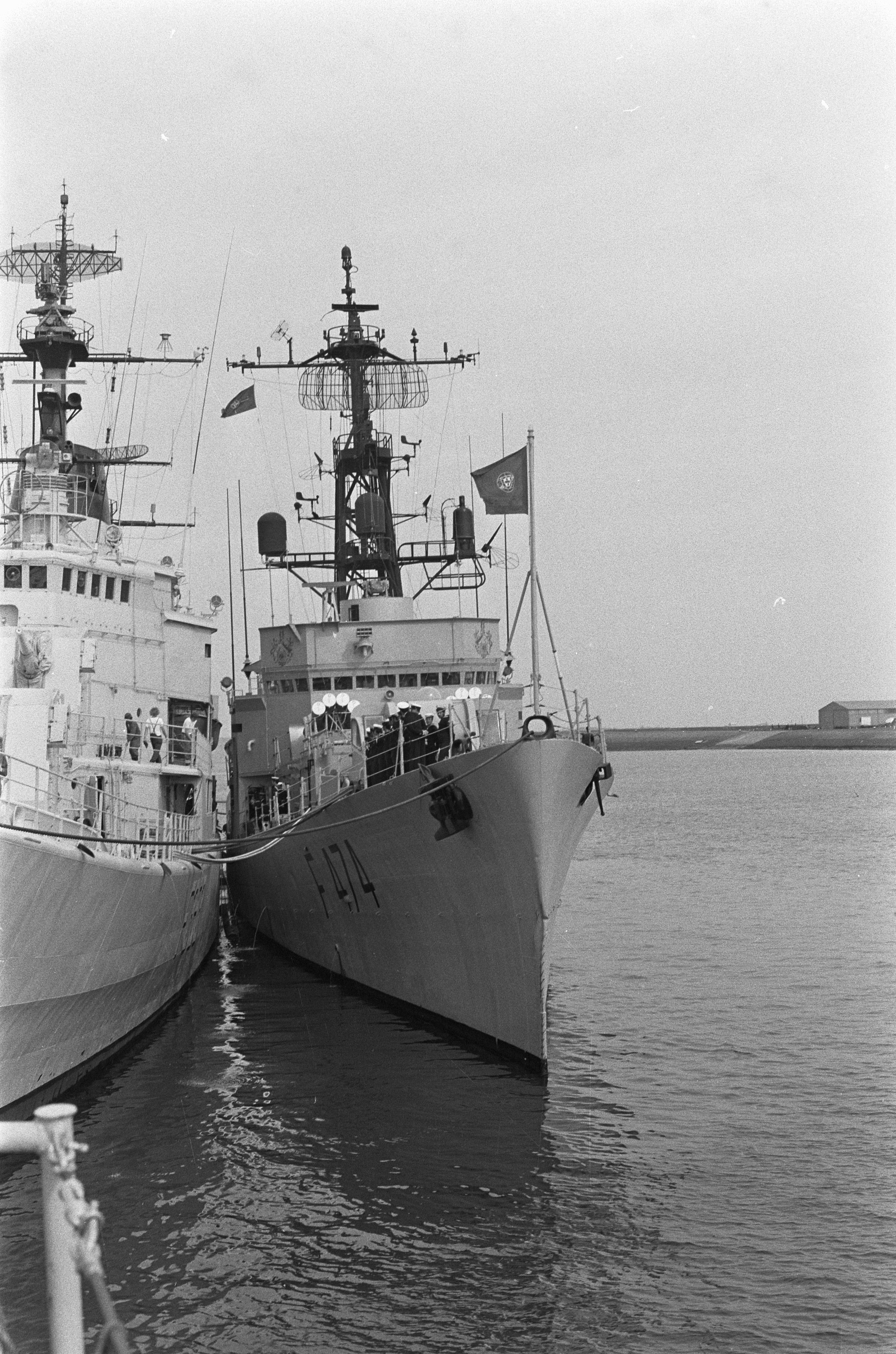
HDMS Herluf Trolle alongside NRP Almirante Magalhães Correia at Den Helder on 24 August 1973.

== See also ==
- HDMS Sælen (S323)
- HDMS Peder Skram (F352)
