= Peder Skram-class frigate =

1960s Danish frigates

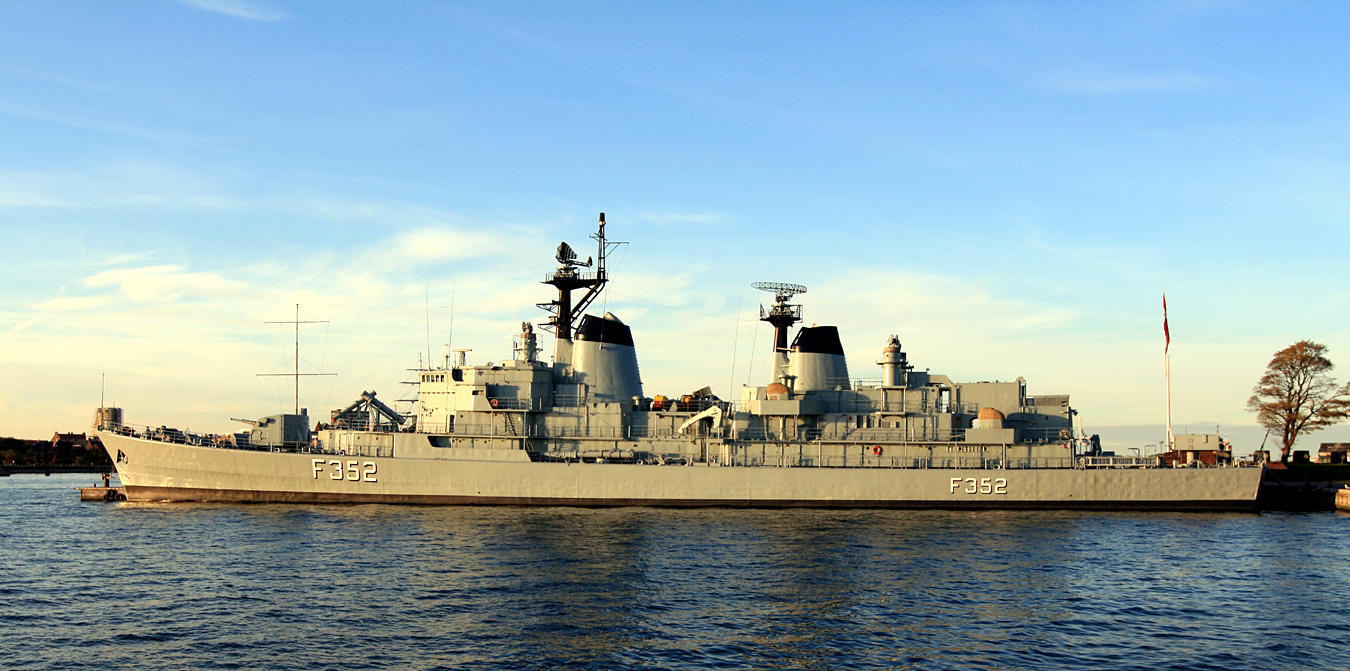
- Peder Skram

Class overview
- Name: Peder Skram class
- Builders: Helsingør Skibsværft og Maskinbyggeri A/S, Denmark
- Operators: Royal Danish Navy
- Succeeded by: Niels Juel-class corvette
- Built: 1964–1967
- In commission: 1967–1990
- Planned: 2
- Completed: 2
- Retired: 2
- Preserved: 1

General characteristics
- Type: Frigate
- Displacement: 2,200 long tons (2,200 t) standard; 2,720 long tons (2,760 t) full load
- Length: 112.6 m (369 ft 5 in)
- Beam: 12 m (39 ft 4 in)
- Draught: 4.3 m (14 ft 1 in)
- Propulsion: 2 shaft CODOG; 2 x 22,000 shp (16,000 kW) STAL-LAVAL gas turbines (Pratt & Whitney FT4 derived); 2 x 2,400 shp (1,800 kW) General Motors diesel engines
- Speed: 28 knots (52 km/h; 32 mph)
- Range: 2,500 nmi (4,600 km; 2,900 mi) at 18 knots (33 km/h; 21 mph)
- Complement: Initially; 207; After Mid-Life Update; 180
- Sensors & processing systems: Radar: CWS-2, CWS-3, NWS-1, NWS-2, 3 x M-66, 2 x Mk91 (added on refit); Sonar: MS-26
- Armament: As built; 2 x twin 5 in (130 mm)/38 guns; 4 × single 40 mm (1.6 in)/L70 Bofors guns; 8 × Depth charges; 2 × twin 553 mm (21.8 in) torpedo tubes - Fitted in 1970; After Mid-Life Update; 1 × twin 5 in/38 guns; 4 × single 40 mm/L70 Bofors guns; 2 × twin 21 in torpedo tubes; 8 x Harpoon SSM; 1 × 8 Sea Sparrow SAM launcher; 8 × Depth charges

The Peder Skram-class frigate was a class of frigates built for the Royal Danish Navy in the period 1964–1967. Only two vessels in this class were ever constructed, Peder Skram (F352) and Herluf Trolle (F353). The ships were named after Danish admirals Peder Skram and Herluf Trolle.

The ships were modernised in 1976–1978 and fitted with guided missiles. Herluf Trolle suffered a serious engine room fire in 1982 and was repaired by 1983. Both ships were placed in reserve in 1987 and decommissioned in 1990. Peder Skram is preserved and open to the public at the naval station in Copenhagen. Herluf Trolle was scrapped in Belgium in 1995.

== See also ==
- List of frigate classes by country

Equivalent frigates of the same era

- Alpino class
- Van Speijk class
- Condell class
- Brooke class
- Nilgiri class
