= HDMS Peder Skram (F352) =

Museum ship in Copenhagen, Denmark

Coordinates: 55.6885°N 12.6049°E

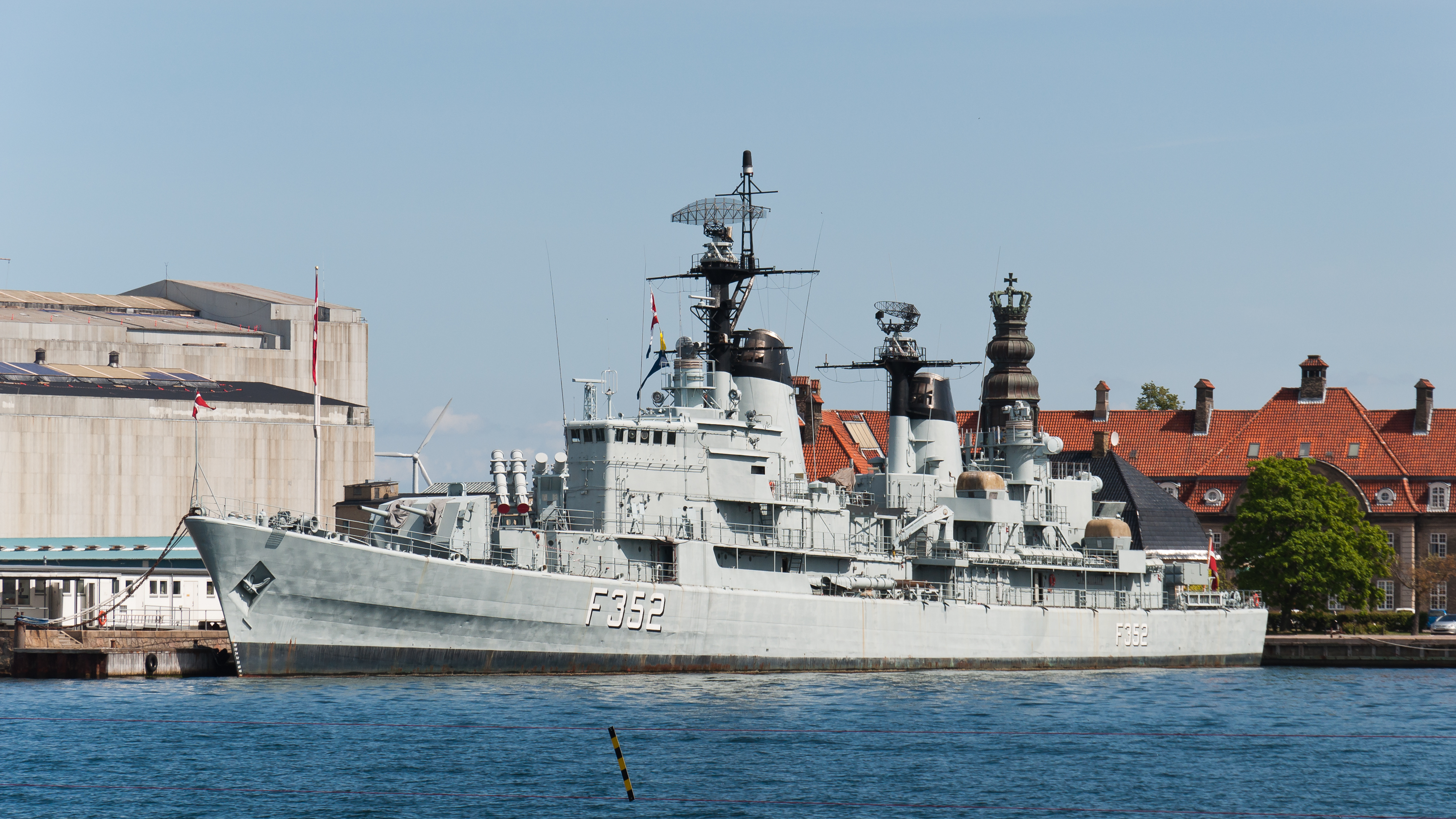
- HDMS Peder Skram as museum ship on 6 August 2014

History

Denmark
- Name: Peder Skram
- Namesake: Peder Skram
- Builder: Helsingør Skibsværft, Elsinore
- Laid down: 25 September 1964
- Launched: 20 May 1965
- Commissioned: 25 May 1966
- Decommissioned: 5 July 1990
- Identification: Callsign: OUEP; Pennant number: F352
- Fate: Museum ship

General characteristics
- Class & type: Peder Skram-class frigate
- Displacement: 2,755 t (2,711 long tons) full load
- Length: 112.65 m (369 ft 7 in)
- Beam: 12.25 m (40 ft 2 in)
- Draught: 5.2 m (17 ft 1 in)
- Propulsion: 2 × 22,000 shp (16,405 kW) gas turbines (modified Pratt & Whitney JT4); 2 × 2,400 shp (1,790 kW) General Motors diesel engines
- Speed: 32 knots (37 mph; 59 km/h)
- Range: 7,200 nmi (13,300 km) at 15 kn (17 mph; 28 km/h)
- Complement: 207
- Armament: Up to 1977 : 4 × 127 mm cannon (US 5"/38 caliber gun); 4 × 40 mm L/70 cannon (Bofors 40 mm); Depth charges; 4 × 533 mm torpedoes; From 1978 : 2 × 127 mm cannon (US 5"/38 caliber gun); 4 × 40 mm L/70 cannon (Bofors 40 mm); Depth charges; 4 × 533 mm torpedoes; 8 × Sea Sparrow SAMs; 8 × Harpoon SSMs

HDMS Peder Skram (F352) was a Peder Skram-class frigate in the Royal Danish Navy which was in use until 1990. It is now docked at Holmen in Copenhagen where it serves as a privately operated museum ship along with the ships of the Royal Danish Naval Museum. The ship is named after Peder Skram, a 16th-century Danish admiral.

== Construction and career ==
She was laid down on 25 September 1964 and launched on 20 May 1965 by Helsingør Skinsværft, Elsinore. Commissioned on 25 May 1966.

Peder Skram was an innovative design using a hybrid propulsion system, a combined gas turbine and diesel approach (CODOG). Peder Skram underwent significant refit in 1970 and a midlife update 1977–78

On 11 June 1980, along with a minelayer Falster, by aggressive manoeuvring, drove off Polish command landing ship ORP Grunwald, reconnoitering the Danish coast near Hesselø island.

=== 1982 Harpoon missile incident ===
In 1982 Peder Skram was involved in the accidental launch of a Harpoon missile, which inflicted no bodily harm.

=== Decommissioning and Museum Ship ===
Peder Skram was decommissioned in 1990, internal installations were auctioned off as scrap two years later. In the mid-1990s it was decided to restore her as a museum ship.

Peder Skram is today operated as a museum ship on a volunteer basis. It is open to visitors every day from 11am to 5pm in the school summer and autumn vacations and in all weekends in June and August.

== Gallery ==
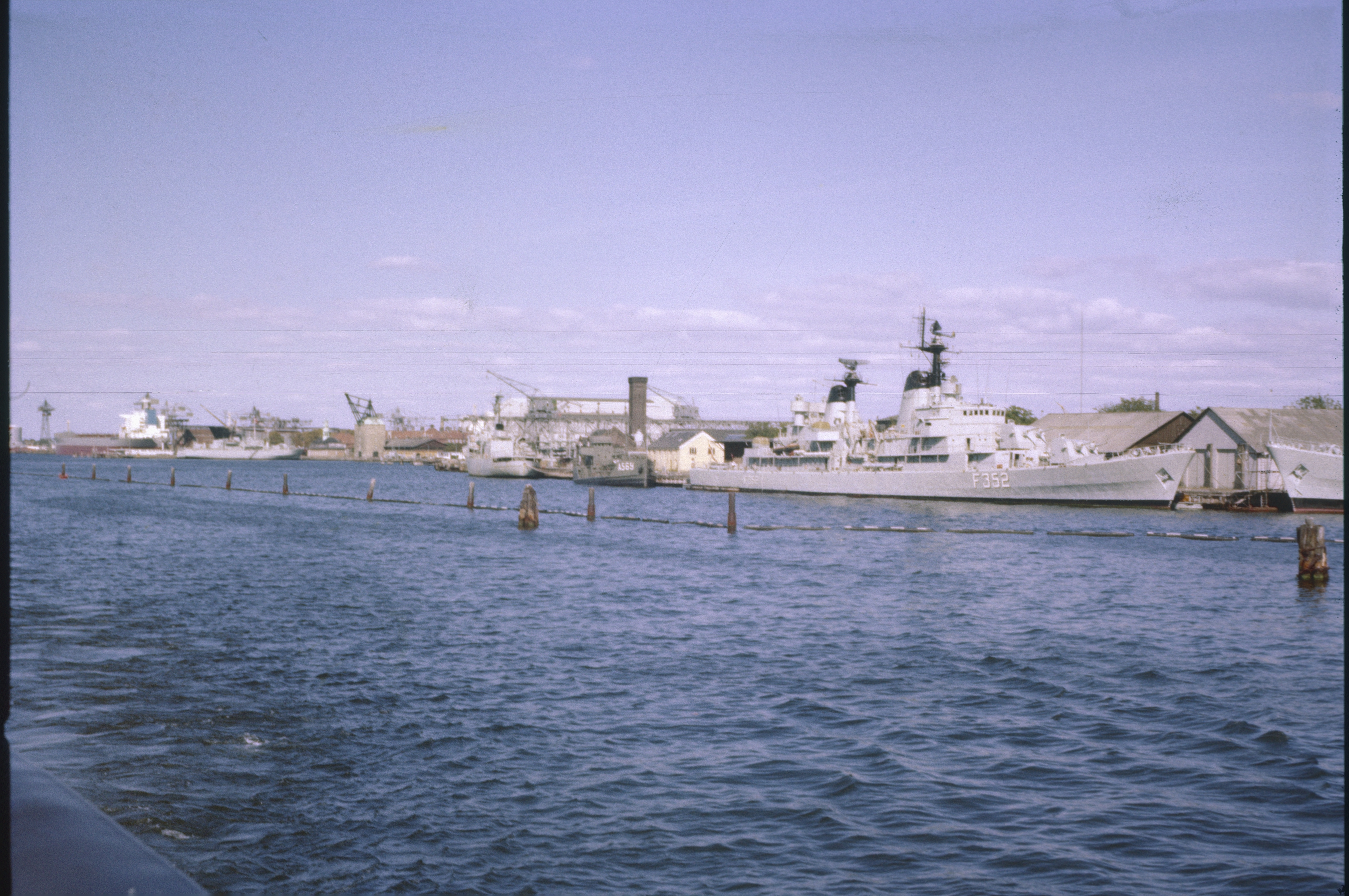
HDMS Peder Skram on 16 September 1978.

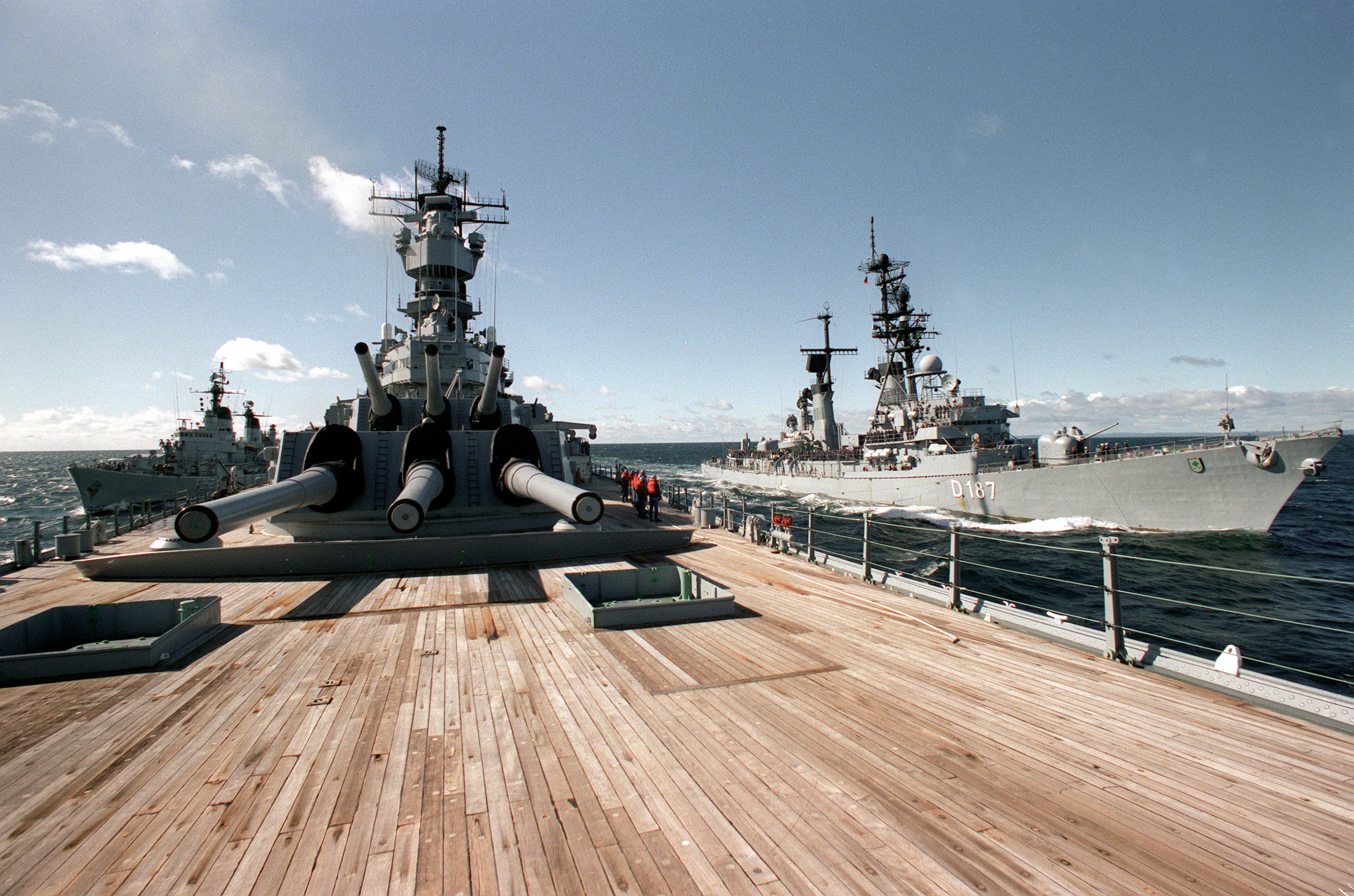
USS Iowa alongside Rommel and HDMS Peder Skram on 1 September 1986.

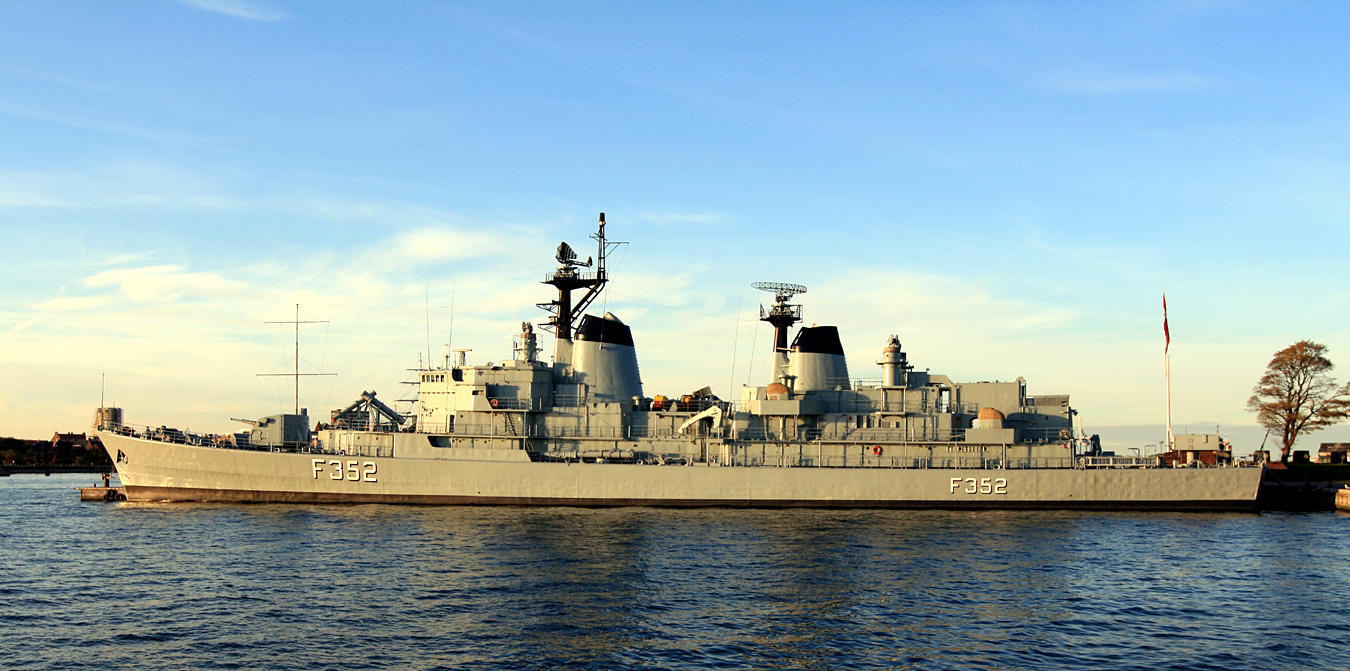
HDMS Peder Skram at Copenhagen on 13 October 2007.

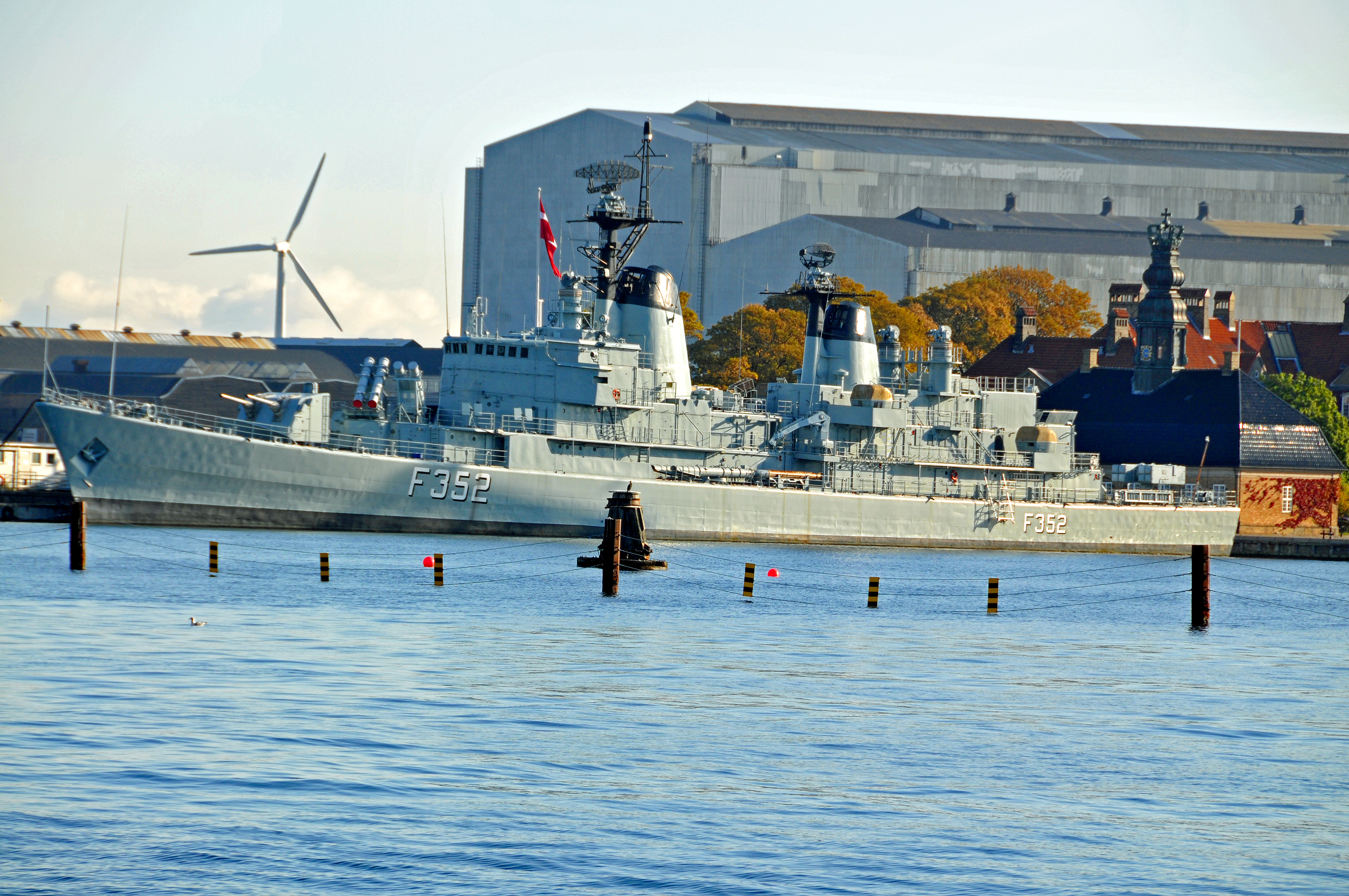
HDMS Peder Skram at Copenhagen on 16 September 2009.

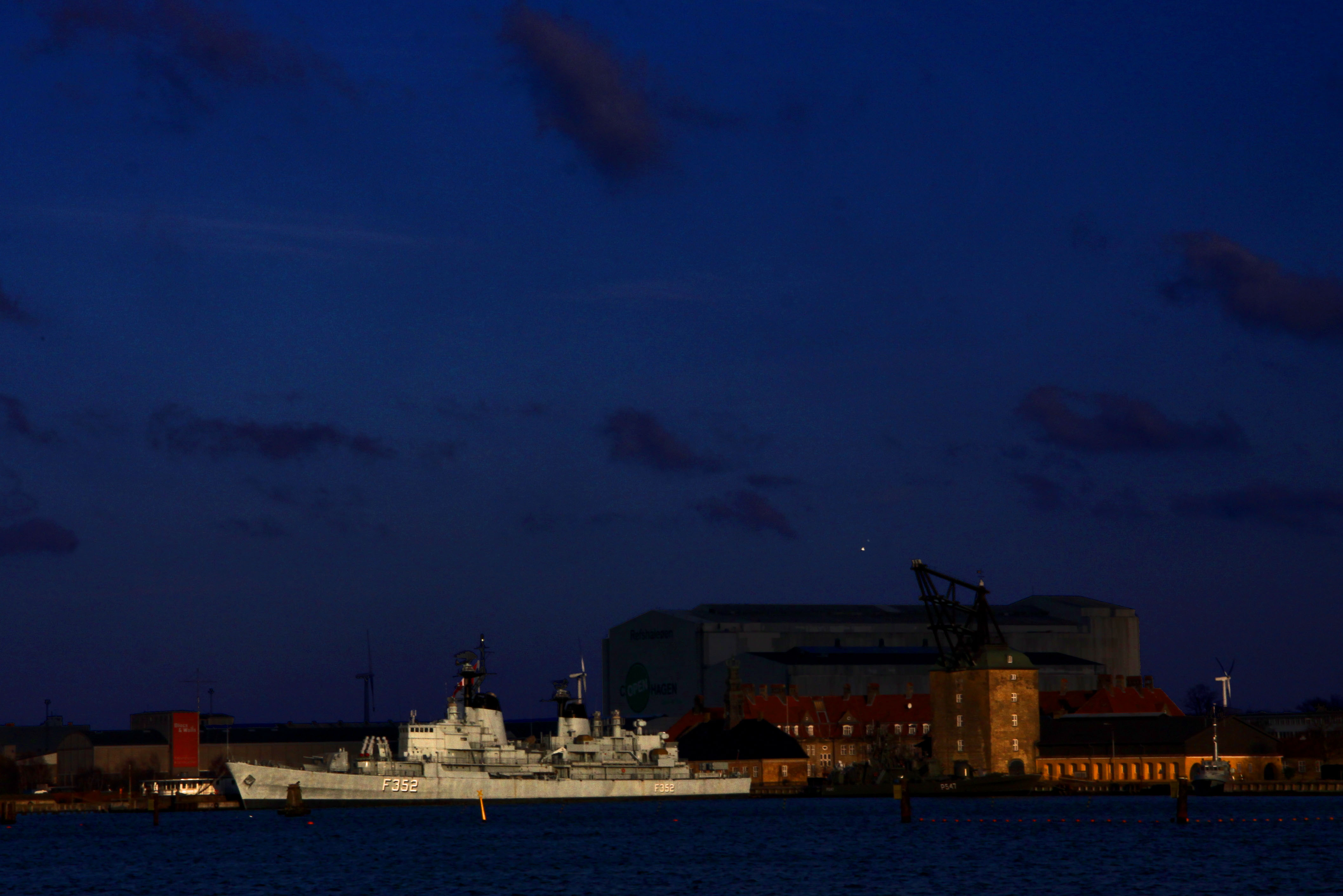
HDMS Peder Skram at Copenhagen on 30 November 2014.

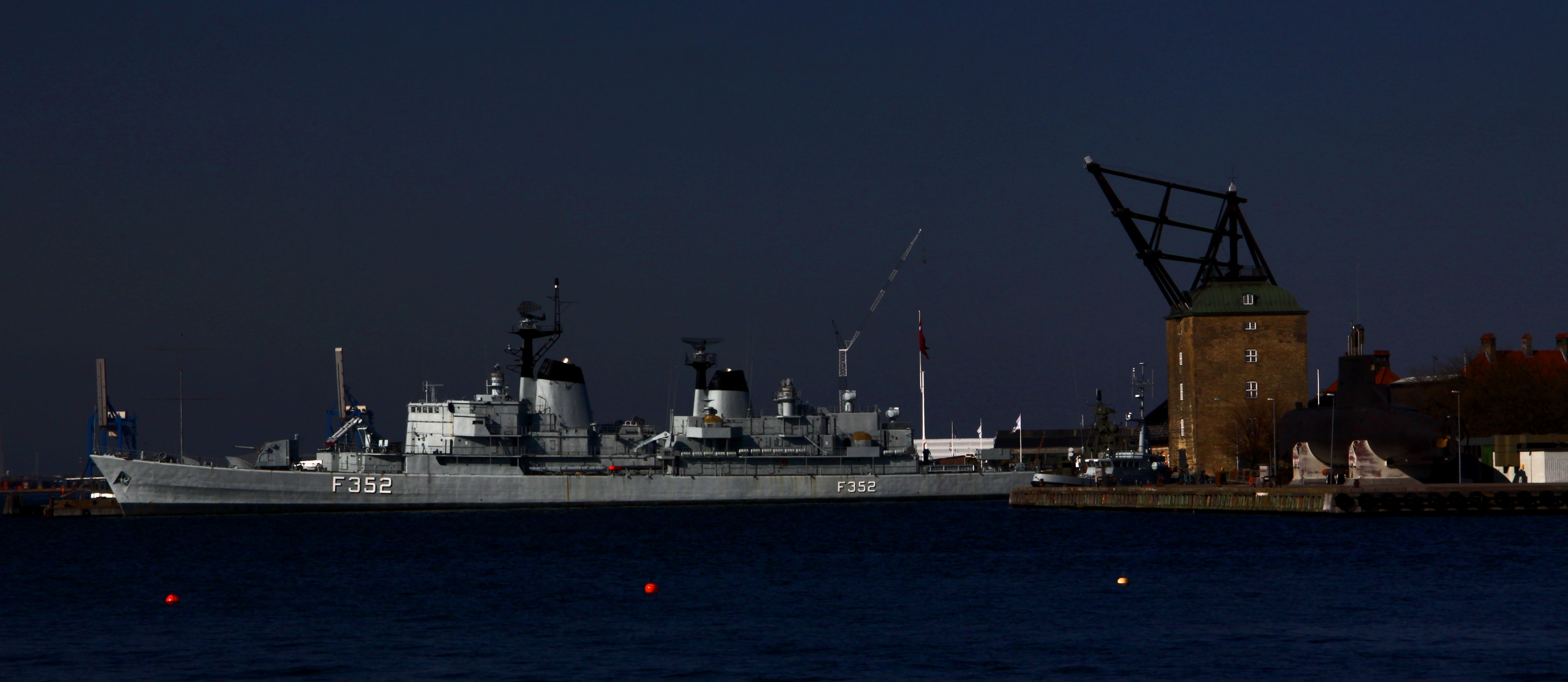
HDMS Peder Skram at Copenhagen on 10 April 2015.

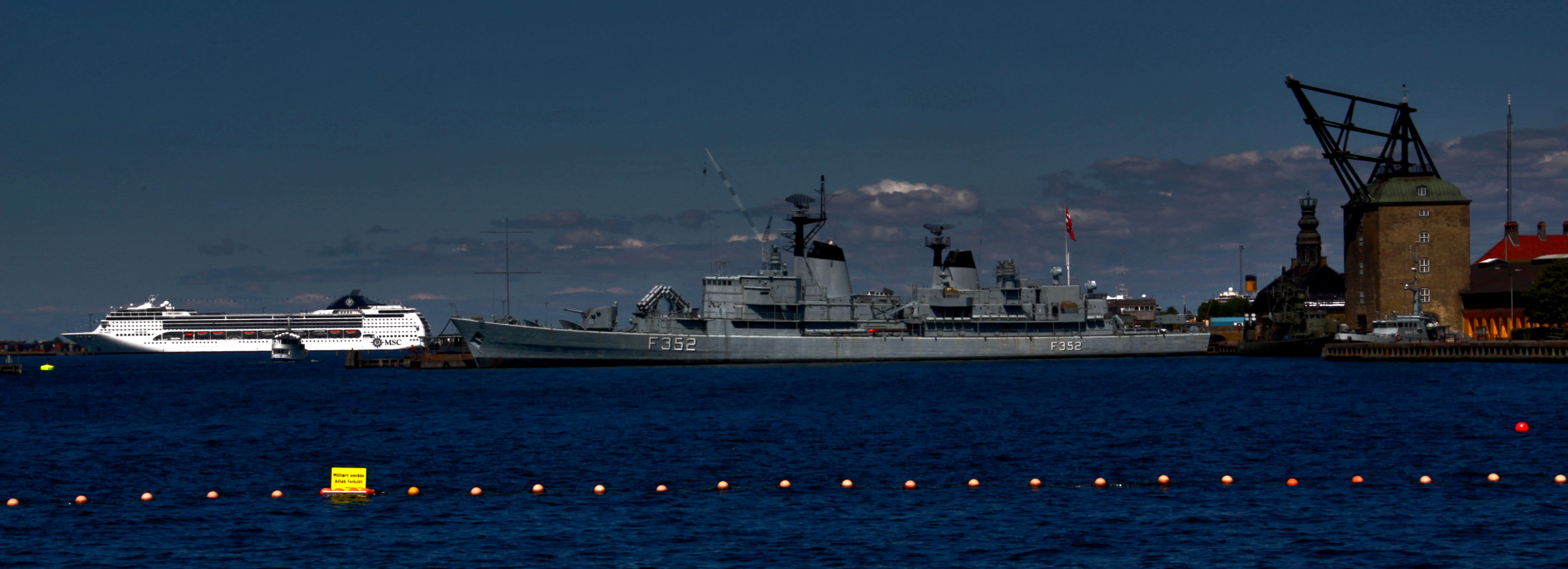
HDMS Peder Skram at Copenhagen on 11 June 2016.

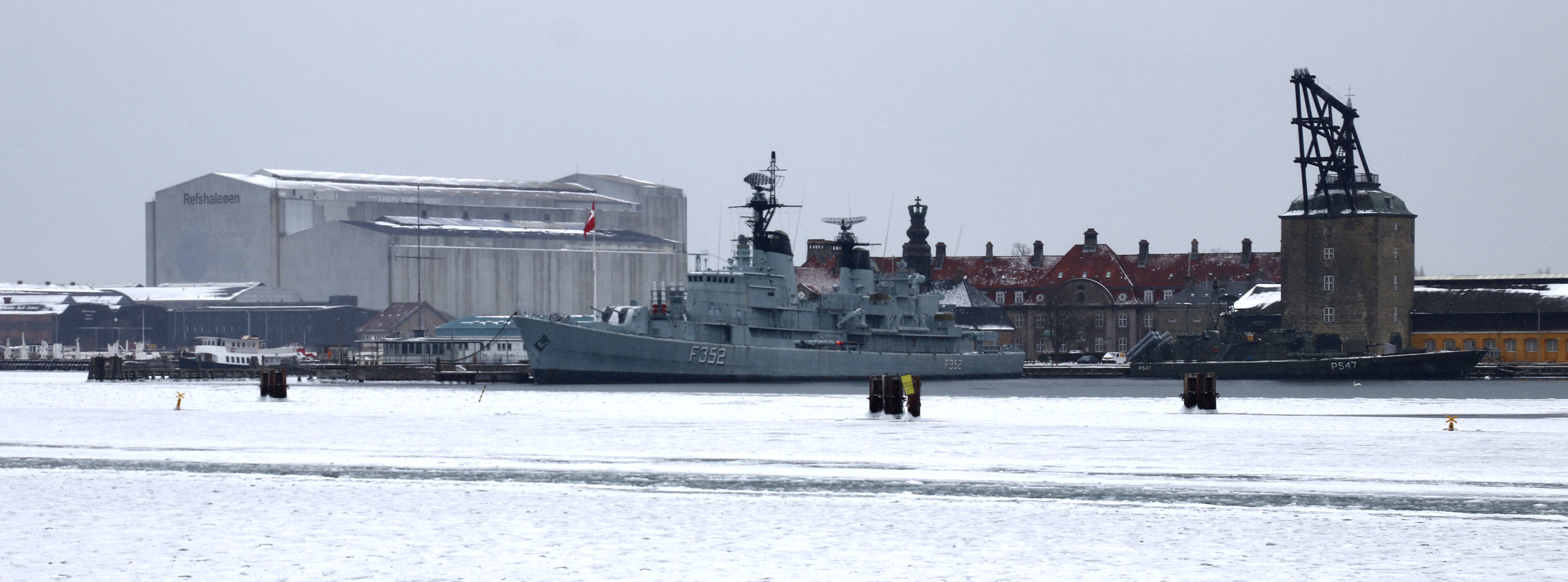
HDMS Peder Skram at Copenhagen on 3 March 2018.

== See also ==
- HDMS Sælen (S323)
- List of museums in and around Copenhagen
