= HDMS Ravnen =

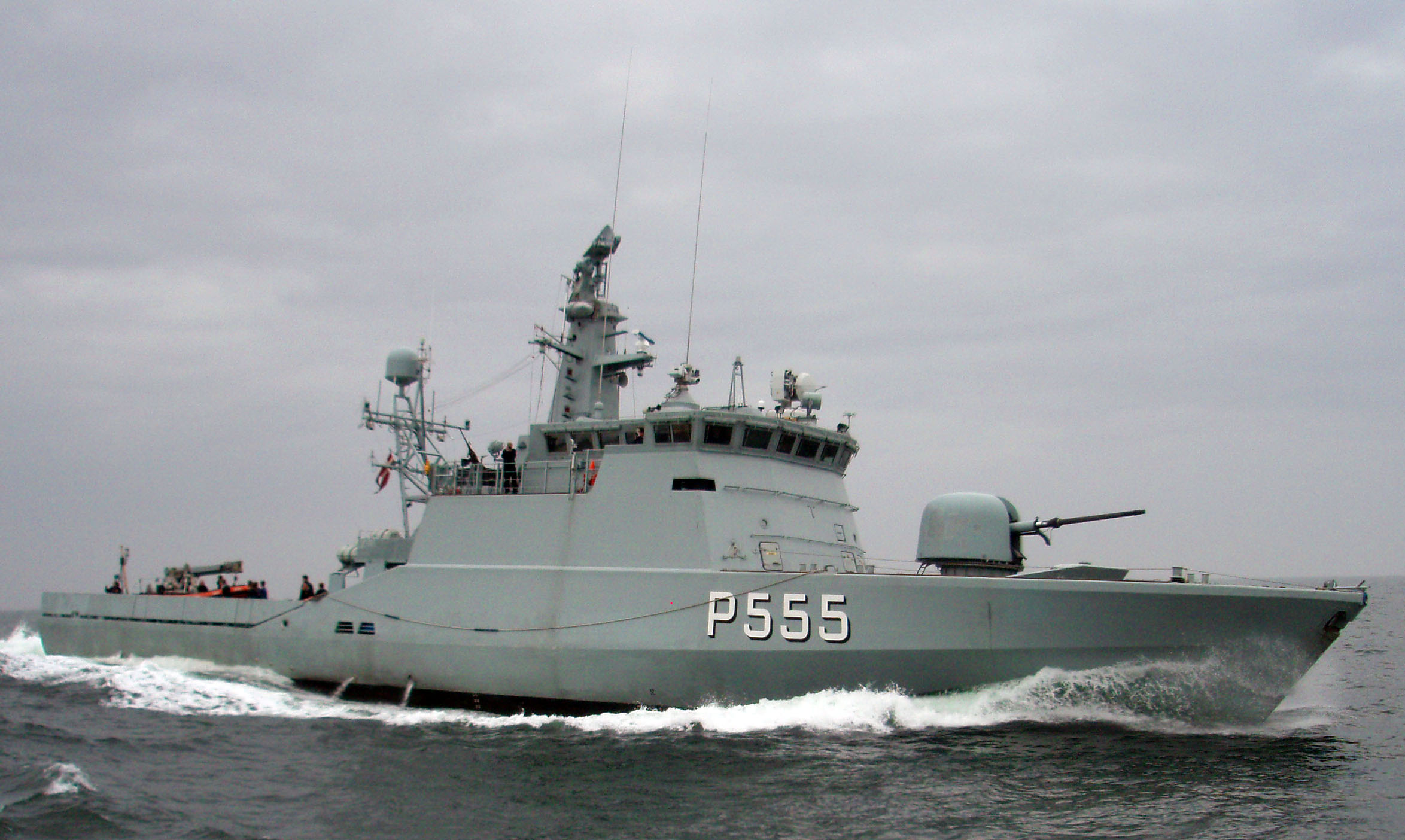
- Sistership HDMS Storen

History

Denmark
- Name: Ravnen
- Namesake: Raven in Danish
- Builder: Danyard A/S, Frederikshavn
- Launched: 1994
- Commissioned: 7 October 1994
- Decommissioned: 7 October 2010
- Identification: Hull number: P560
- Fate: Sold to Portugal

Portugal
- Name: Douro
- Acquired: October 2014
- Commissioned: 2015
- Identification: Hull number: P591
- Status: In service

General characteristics
- Class & type: Flyvefisken-class patrol vessel
- Displacement: 400 tonnes (394 long tons)
- Length: 54 m (177 ft 2 in)
- Beam: 9 m (29 ft 6 in)
- Draught: 3.60 m (11 ft 10 in)
- Propulsion: 2× MTU 16V 396TB94 diesel engines (5,440 hp (4,060 kW) total); 1× General Electric LM500 gas turbine (5,450 hp (4,060 kW)); 3× Rexroth auxiliary engines
- Speed: 20 knots (37 km/h; 23 mph) (28 knots (52 km/h; 32 mph) with gas turbine)
- Range: 2,000 nmi (3,700 km)
- Boats & landing craft carried: 1× RHIB
- Complement: 19
- Sensors & processing systems: 1× Furuno navigation radar; 1× Terma Scanter mil surface radar; 1× Flexfire fire control radar
- Armament: Guns; 1× OTO Melara 76 mm/62 gun; 2× 12.7 mm machine guns; Missiles; FIM-92 Sea Stinger (in MCM role); 12× RIM-162 Evolved Sea Sparrow (in combat role); 8× RGM-84 Harpoon (in combat role); Torpedoes; 4× MU90 torpedoes (in combat role)

NRP Douro (P591) (ex-HDMS Ravnen (P560)) is a former patrol boat of the Royal Danish Navy. Since 2015 she is in service with the Portuguese Navy.

== History ==
She is the fourth ship from series 2 of the Flyvefisken class, which is also known as the Standardflex 300 or SF300 class. She was launched in 1994, with the commissioning taking place on 7 October 1994.

In October 2014, Ravnen was sold to the Portuguese Navy together with four other ships of the class. She was renamed Douro. After a refit she was commissioned in 2015.
