= HDMS Lommen =

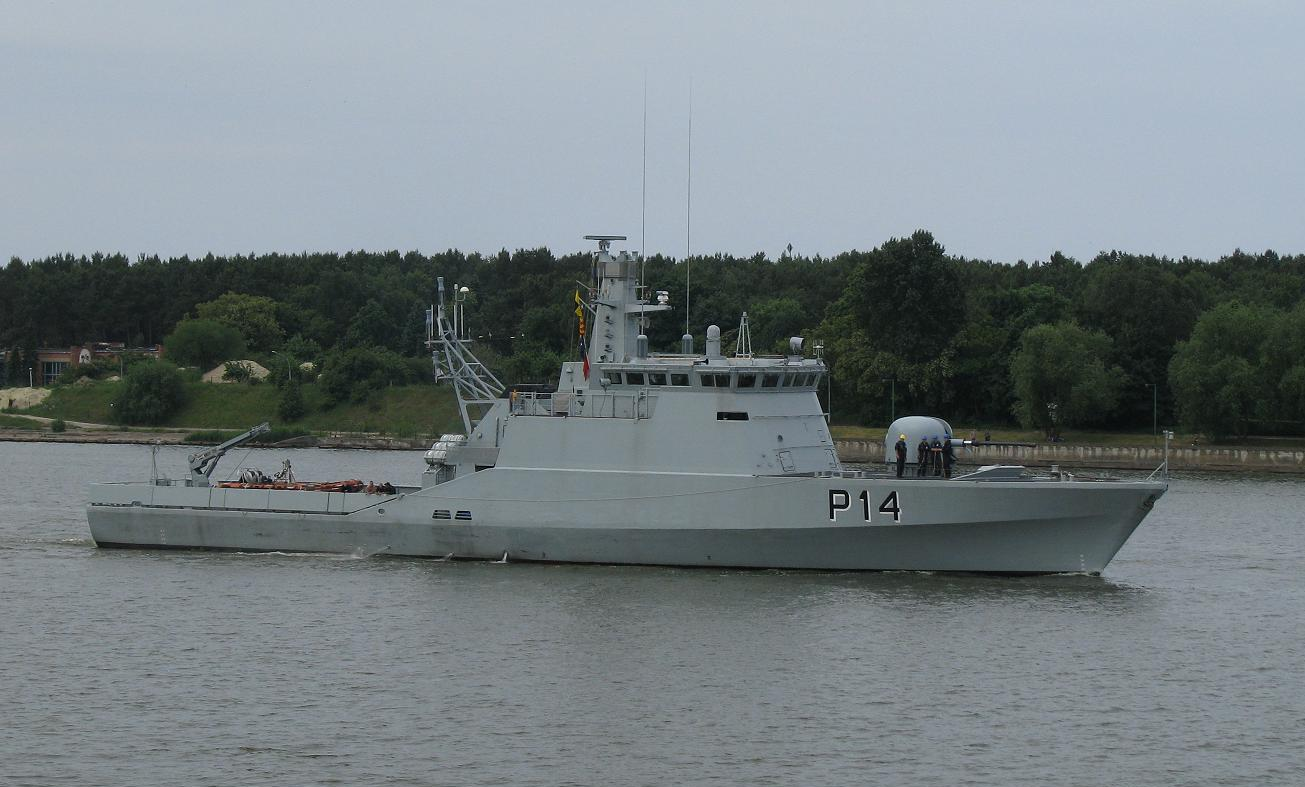
- LNS Aukštaitis

History

Denmark
- Name: Lommen
- Namesake: Loon in Danish
- Builder: Danyard A/S, Frederikshavn
- Launched: 1993
- Commissioned: 21 January 1994
- Decommissioned: 29 January 2010
- Identification: Hull number: P559
- Fate: Sold to Lithuania

Lithuania
- Name: Aukštaitis
- Namesake: Aukštaitija region
- Commissioned: 2010
- Identification: MMSI number: 277155000; Hull number: P 14
- Status: In service

General characteristics
- Class & type: Flyvefisken-class patrol vessel
- Displacement: 400 tonnes (394 long tons)
- Length: 54 m (177 ft 2 in)
- Beam: 9 m (29 ft 6 in)
- Draught: 3.60 m (11 ft 10 in)
- Propulsion: 2× MTU 16V 396TB94 diesel engines (5,440 hp (4,060 kW) total); 1× General Electric LM500 gas turbine (5,450 hp (4,060 kW)); 3× Rexroth auxiliary engines
- Speed: 20 knots (37 km/h; 23 mph) (28 knots (52 km/h; 32 mph) with gas turbine)
- Range: 2,000 nmi (3,700 km)
- Boats & landing craft carried: 1x RHIB
- Complement: 19 to 29
- Sensors & processing systems: 1× Furuno navigation radar; 1× Terma Scanter mil surface radar; 1× Flexfire fire control radar
- Armament: Guns; 1× OTO Melara 76 mm/62 gun; 2× 12.7 mm machine guns; Missiles; FIM-92 Sea Stinger (in MCM role); 12x RIM-162 Evolved Sea Sparrow (in combat role); 8× RGM-84 Harpoon (in combat role); Torpedoes; 4× MU90 torpedoes (in combat role)

LNS Aukštaitis (P 14) (ex-HDMS Lommen (P559)) is a former patrol boat of the Royal Danish Navy. Since 2010 she is in service with the Lithuanian Navy.

== History ==
She is the tenth ship in the Flyvefisken class, which is also known as the Standardflex 300 or SF300 class. She was launched on 1993, with the commissioning taking place on 21 January 1994.

In 2010, Lommen was sold to the Lithuanian Navy, which renamed her Aukštaitis. After a refit she was commissioned into the navy.
