= StanFlex =

Multi-role payload module used by the Danish Navy

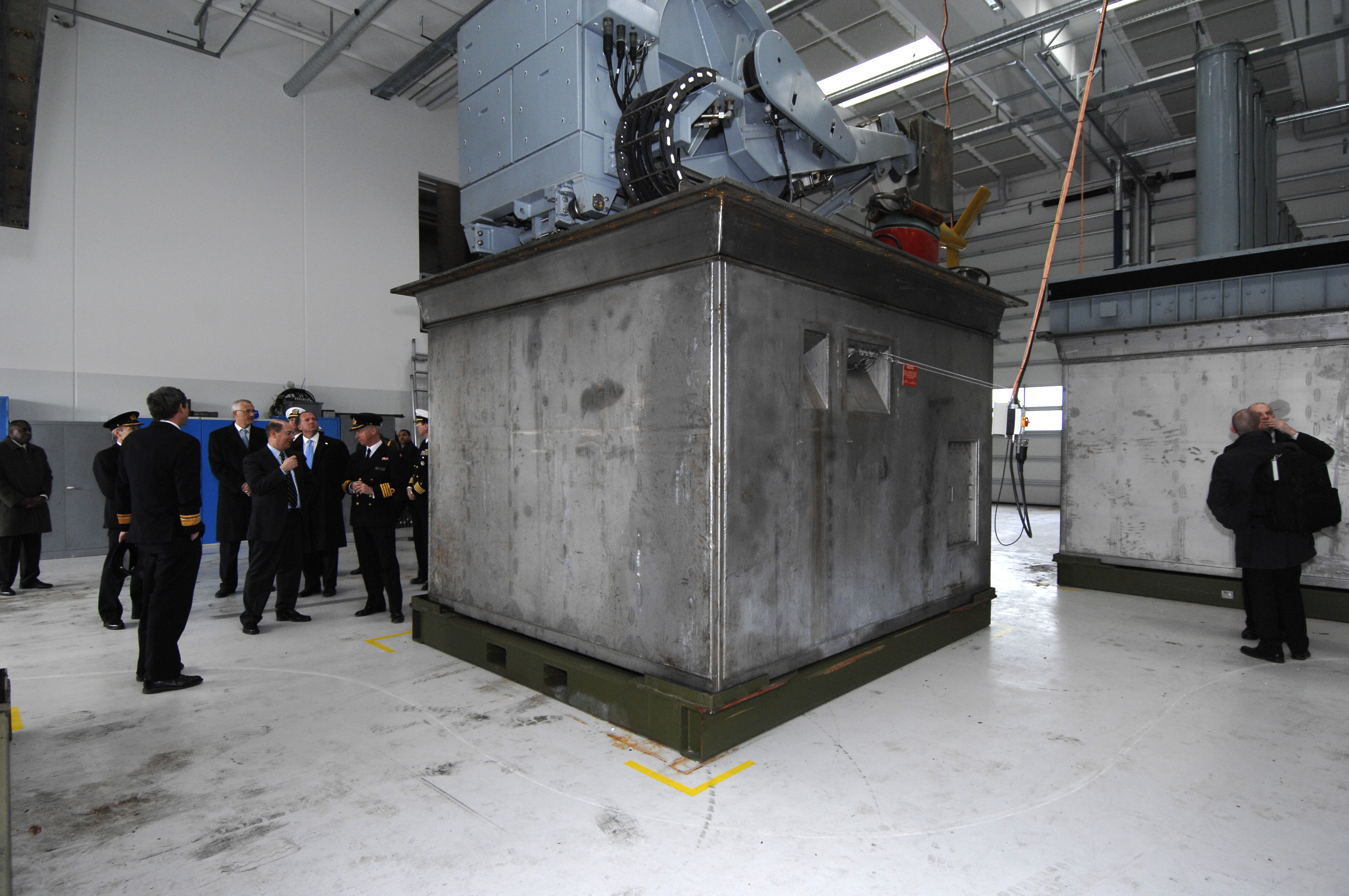
A mine countermeasures StanFlex module in storage at Naval Base Korsør

StanFlex (also known as STANFLEX or Standard Flex) is a modular mission payload system used by the Royal Danish Navy. Originally conceived during the 1980s as a way of replacing several classes of minor war vessel with a single class of multi-role ships (the Flyvefisken class), the StanFlex system consists of weapons and equipment mounted in standardised containers, which can be loaded into slots on the ships. These containers can be swapped out in a short period of time, allowing the ship to switch between roles when needed. The success of the modular payload system led the Royal Danish Navy to design all new warships with StanFlex slots, and to install slots on older vessels during major refits. By 2012, nine ship classes capable of carrying StanFlex payloads were in service.

== Development ==
During the early 1980s, the Royal Danish Navy (RDN) required replacements for three classes of minor war vessel, but could not afford to replace all 22 ships on a one-for-one basis. Instead of building dedicated replacements for each role, the RDN came up with the idea for a single vessel design which could be modified to assume a particular role when needed. Equipment common to all roles would be built into the ship, while mission specific payloads would be built into modules, which could be fitted into standardised slots aboard the ship when needed. This modular payload system came to be known as "Standard Flex", or "StanFlex" for short.

Feasibility studies during 1983 and 1984 led to the design of the Standard Flex 300 vessel (later named the Flyvefisken class); 16 of which could replace the 22 previous vessels. These were 54-metre (177 ft 2 in) long, 320-ton patrol vessels, fitted with one Standard Flex slot forward and three aft. The modules themselves were designed by the Naval Materiel Command and Promecon A/S. Construction commenced in July 1985, with 14 vessels (2 having been cancelled in 1993) commissioned by mid-1996. As other warship types were replaced, the new vessels were designed to carry StanFlex modules.

== Module design and use ==
Stanflex modules are constructed by Monberg & Thorsen. Each module is housed in a stainless steel container measuring 3 metres (9.8 ft) in length, 3.5 metres (11 ft) in width, and 2.5 metres (8.2 ft) in height. Precision-machined flanges ensure that the module accurately mates up with connections for mounting, local area network, video, degaussing, interior communications, weapons fire control and cooling water. The weapon or system is mounted on the roof of the module, while the machinery, electronics, and supporting equipment are housed within.

Modules are usually installed and replaced by a 15-ton capacity mobile crane. A module can be swapped out and replaced within half an hour, and after system testing completed, the ship is ready to deploy within a few hours. However, refresher training for the ship's crew will take significantly longer. Standardised consoles are fitted in the combat information centre: the console's role is defined by the software installed, which can be quickly replaced. The ease of installation and use is compared by naval personnel to another Danish product: Lego.

=== Benefits and drawbacks ===
- Unused modules can be stored in controlled conditions, reducing the need for preventative maintenance.
- Ships do not need to be taken out of service when equipment requires maintenance, and vice versa.
- New weapons and systems can be installed on the vessels by fitting them to a module, instead of refitting the entire ship.
- When a ship or class is removed from service, the modules can be reused by other vessels. Similarly, as they do not have to be built into the ship, modular weapons and systems do not have to be factored into the purchase cost of a new vessel: in 2006, a proposed 6,000-ton frigate design for the KDM was predicted to cost DKK 1.6 billion per ship (USD 254 million), while similar projects in other European nations were slated to cost between DKK 2.6 billion and DKK 6.3 billion (USD 413 million to 1 billion).
- The multi-role ships are slightly less efficient than a dedicated ship in a particular role, but the ability to be quickly reequipped for other roles more than makes up for this.

=== Inventory ===
As of 2001, the KDM inventory of StanFlex modules included:

Type	Equipment	Quantity
SSM	2 Mk 141 quad launchers for Boeing RGM-84 Harpoon missiles	10
SAM	6-cell Mk 48 Mod 3 launcher for RIM-7 Sea Sparrow missiles	20
Gun	1 Otobreda 76/62 Compact gun, module has open sides for ease of maintenance	19
ASW	Launchers for MU90 Impact torpedoes	4
VDS	Thales Underwater Systems TSM 2640 Salmon variable-depth active/passive sonar	4
MCM	Command and control equipment to operate MSF and MRD class drone minehunters and Double Eagle ROVs	5
Crane	1 hydraulic crane for launch/recovery of a RHIB or deployment of sea mines from external rails	22
Storage	Below-deck shelving for storage of various equipment, can also carry a RHIB above deck	14
Oceanography	Variant of storage module with specific equipment	2
Anti-pollution	Variant of storage module with specific equipment	3
Survey		1
SIGINT/ELINT		1

By 2006, there were 101 units of 11 types.

== Ships with StanFlex ==
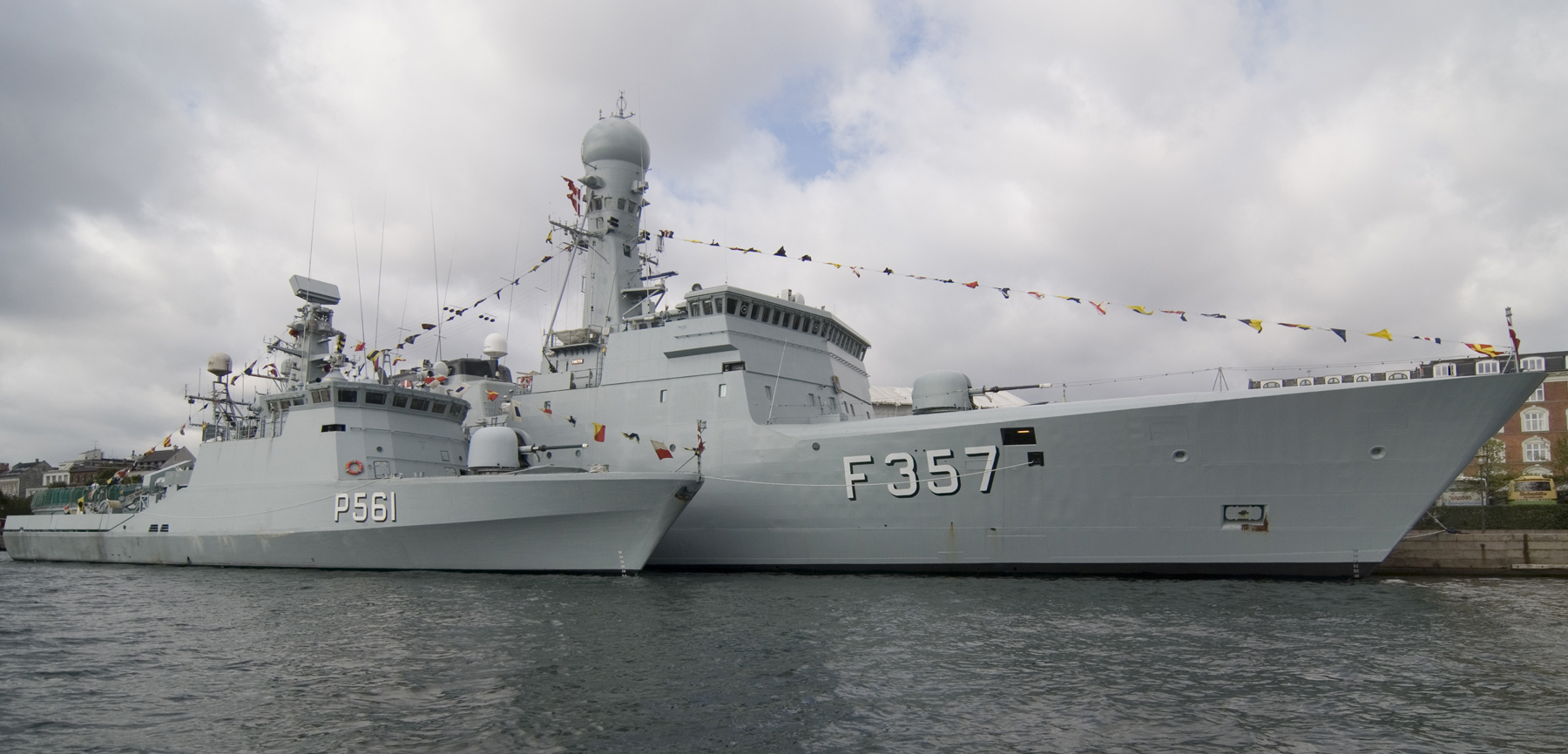
The Thetis-class frigate HDMS Thetis and the Flyvefisken-class patrol vessel HDMS Skaden. Both vessels use StanFlex modules.

As of 2012, nine ship classes were capable of using StanFlex modules.

- Flyvefisken-class-class patrol vessel
  - 1 slot forward, 3 slots aft.
- Diana-class patrol vessel
  - 1 slot aft. Diana-class ships normally operate with a storage or anti-pollution module fitted. Because of the position of the RHIB dock, they cannot embark the variable depth sonar module (which is normally deployed over the stern). The Diana class can be used to transport, but not operate, all other modules.
- Arvak-class tugboat
  - 1 slot aft. For transport only, lacks the necessary connections for active use
- Absalon-class command ship
  - 5 slots on weapons deck amidships. Because of the weapons deck's position, only missile-firing, SIGINT/ELINT and storage modules can be used.
- Niels Juel-class corvette
  - 2 slots aft. Unlike other classes, the Niels Juel-class corvettes were modified for StanFlex during their mid-life modernisation. This class was scrapped in 2013.
- MSF-class drone minehunter
  - 1 slot aft.
- MRD-class drone minehunter
  - 2 slots.
- Iver Huitfeldt-class frigate
  - 2 slots forward, 4 slots on weapons deck amidships (similar to Absalon-class).
- Thetis-class frigate
  - 1 slot forward, 2 slots aft
- Knud Rasmussen-class patrol vessel
  - 1 slot forward, 1 slot aft.
