= HDMS Gribben (P558) =

Patrol boat of the Royal Danish Navy

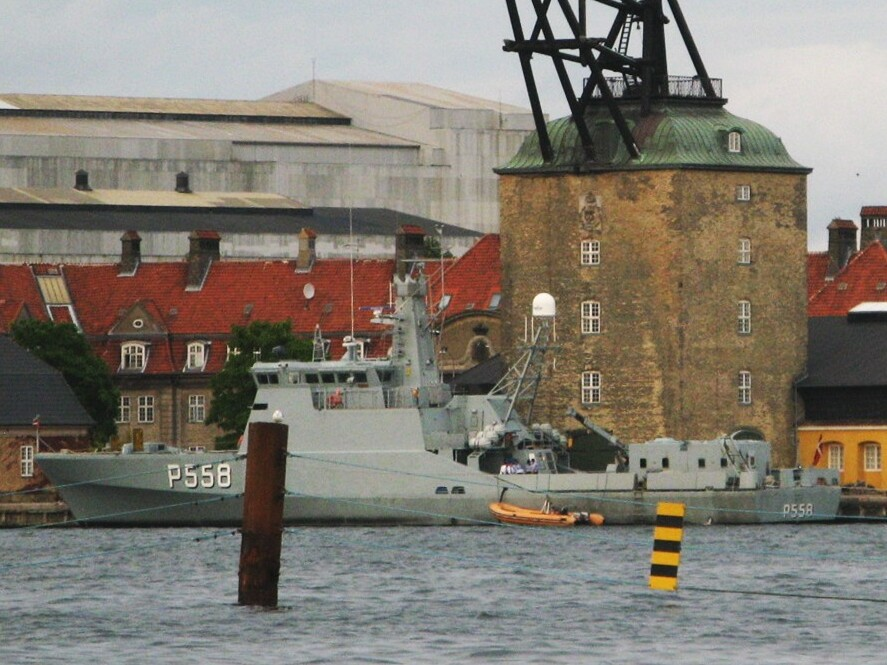
- HDMS Gribben

History

Denmark
- Name: Gribben
- Namesake: Vulture in Danish
- Builder: Danyard A/S, Frederikshavn
- Launched: 1992
- Commissioned: 1 July 1993
- Decommissioned: 7 October 2010
- Identification: Hull number: P558
- Fate: Sold to Portugal

Portugal
- Acquired: October 2014
- Fate: Used for spare parts

General characteristics
- Class & type: Flyvefisken-class patrol vessel
- Displacement: 400 tonnes (394 long tons)
- Length: 54 m (177 ft 2 in)
- Beam: 9 m (29 ft 6 in)
- Draught: 3.60 m (11 ft 10 in)
- Propulsion: 2× MTU 16V 396TB94 diesel engines (5,440 hp (4,060 kW) total); 1× General Electric LM500 gas turbine (5,450 hp (4,060 kW)); 3× Rexroth auxiliary engines
- Speed: 20 knots (37 km/h; 23 mph) (28 knots (52 km/h; 32 mph) with gas turbine)
- Range: 2,000 nmi (3,700 km)
- Boats & landing craft carried: 1x RHIB
- Complement: 19
- Sensors & processing systems: 1× Furuno navigation radar; 1× Terma Scanter mil surface radar; 1× Flexfire fire control radar
- Armament: Guns; 1× OTO Melara 76 mm/62 gun; 2× 12.7 mm machine guns; Missiles; FIM-92 Sea Stinger (in MCM role); 12x RIM-162 Evolved Sea Sparrow (in combat role); 8× RGM-84 Harpoon (in combat role); Torpedoes; 4× MU90 torpedoes (in combat role)

HDMS Gribben (P558) is a former patrol boat of the Royal Danish Navy. In October 2014 she was sold for spare part to the Portuguese Navy.

== History ==
She is the second ship in series 2 of the Flyvefisken class, which is also known as the Standardflex 300 or SF300 class. She was launched in 1992, with the commissioning taking place on 1 July 1993.

In October 2014, Gribben was sold to the Portuguese Navy together with four other ships of the class. She was not commissioned into the navy, but instead used for spare parts.
