= HDMS Havkatten =

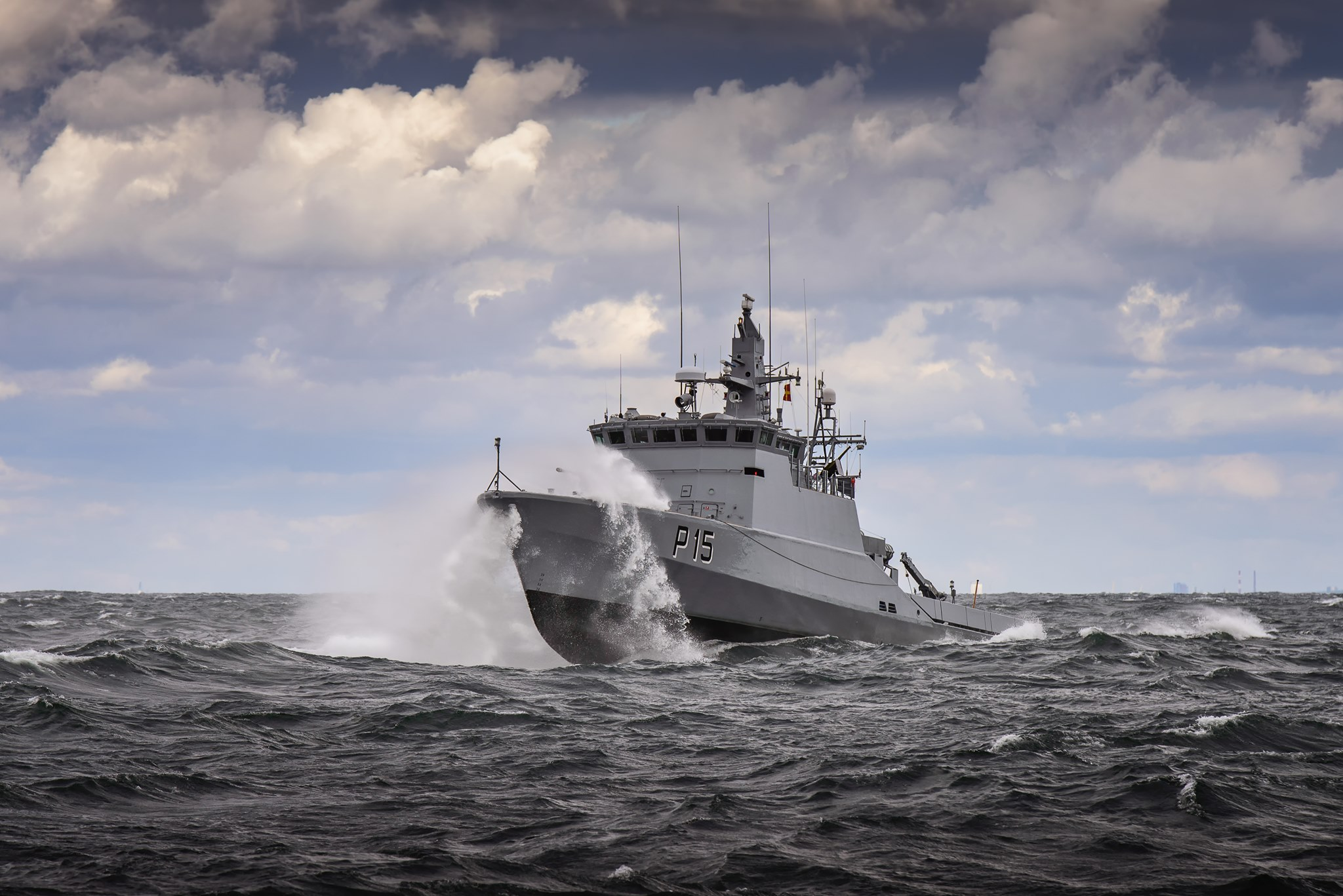
- LNS Sėlis

History

Denmark
- Name: Havkatten
- Namesake: Catfish in Danish
- Builder: Danyard A/S, Frederikshavn
- Laid down: August 1988
- Launched: 13 January 1990
- Commissioned: 1 November 1990
- Decommissioned: 12 January 2012
- Identification: MMSI number: 219000099; Hull number: P552
- Fate: Sold to Lithuania

Lithuania
- Name: Sėlis
- Commissioned: November 2016
- Identification: MMSI number: 277227000; Hull number: P 15
- Status: In service

General characteristics
- Class & type: Flyvefisken-class patrol vessel
- Displacement: 400 tonnes (394 long tons)
- Length: 54 m (177 ft 2 in)
- Beam: 9 m (29 ft 6 in)
- Draught: 3.60 m (11 ft 10 in)
- Propulsion: 2× MTU 16V 396TB94 diesel engines (5,440 hp (4,060 kW) total); 1× General Electric LM500 gas turbine (5,450 hp (4,060 kW)); 1× General Motors 12V-71 hydraulic motor (540 hp (400 kW))
- Speed: 20 knots (37 km/h; 23 mph) (28 knots (52 km/h; 32 mph) with gas turbine)
- Range: 2,000 nmi (3,700 km)
- Boats & landing craft carried: 1x RHIB
- Complement: 19 to 29
- Sensors & processing systems: 1× Furuno navigation radar; 1× Terma Scanter mil surface radar; 1× Flexfire fire control radar
- Armament: Guns; 1× OTO Melara 76 mm/62 gun; 2× 12.7 mm machine guns; Missiles; FIM-92 Sea Stinger (in MCM role); 12x RIM-162 Evolved Sea Sparrow (in combat role); 8× RGM-84 Harpoon (in combat role); Torpedoes; 4× MU90 torpedoes (in combat role)

LNS Sėlis (P 15) (ex-HDMS Havkatten (P552)) is a former patrol boat of the Royal Danish Navy. Since 2016 she is in service with the Lithuanian Navy.

== History ==
She is the third ship in the Flyvefisken class, which is also known as the Standardflex 300 or SF300 class. She was laid down in August 1988, launched on 13 January 1990, with the commissioning taking place on 1 November 1990.

In 2016, Havkatten was sold to the Lithuanian Navy, which renamed her Sėlis. After a refit she was commissioned into the navy.
