= HDMS Gribben =

At least two ships of the Royal Danish Navy have borne the name HDMS Gribben:

- HDMS Gribben (P508) a Falken-class torpedo boat launched in 1962 and decommissioned in 1978.
- HDMS Gribben (P558) a Flyvefisken-class patrol vessel launched in 1992 and sold to Portugal for spare parts in 2014.
