= Knud Rasmussen-class patrol vessel =

Class of Danish warships

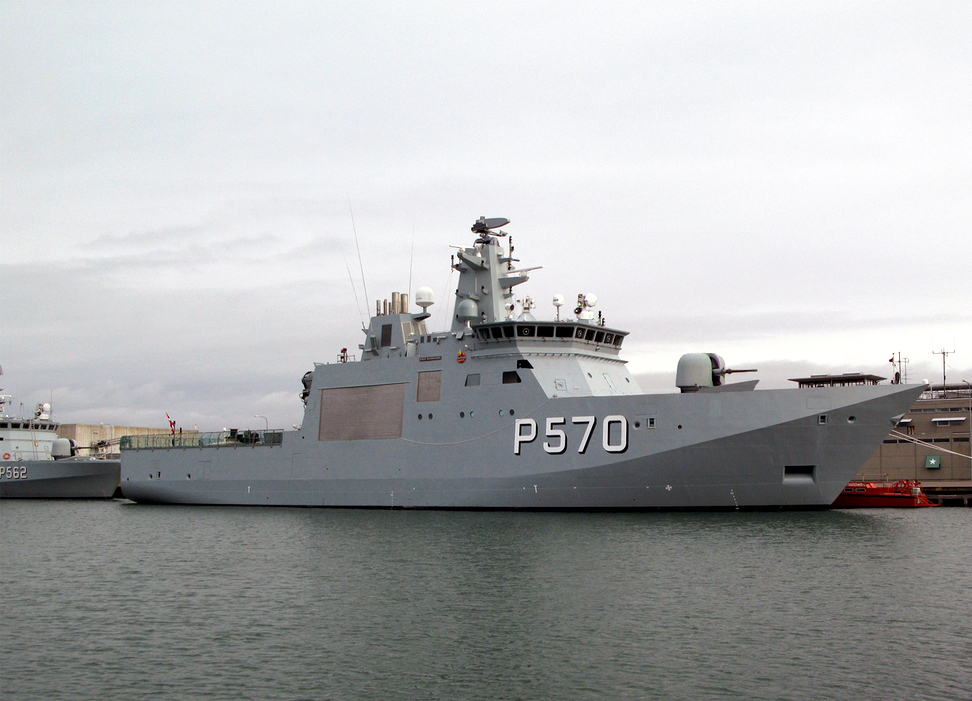
- HDMS Knud Rasmussen

Class overview
- Name: Knud Rasmussen class
- Builders: Karstensens Skibsværft; Hull is built at the Polish Stocznia Pólnocna (Northern Shipyard) in Gdansk
- Operators: Royal Danish Navy
- Preceded by: Agdlek class
- In commission: 2008–present
- Planned: 3
- Completed: 3
- Active: 3

General characteristics
- Type: Ocean patrol craft
- Displacement: 1,720 tons (2,050 t full load)
- Length: LOA 71.8 m (235 ft 7 in); LWL 61.0 m (200 ft 2 in)
- Beam: 14.6 m (47 ft 11 in)
- Draft: 4.9 m (16 ft 1 in)
- Ice class: Finnish-Swedish ice class 1A Super/Polar Class 6)
- Propulsion: 2 x MAN B&W Diesel ALPHA 8L27/38 generating 2,720 kW (3,650 hp) each through RENK reduction gear "Twin in/single out"
- Speed: 17 knots (31 km/h; 20 mph)
- Range: 3,000 nautical miles (5,600 km; 3,500 mi)
- Boats & landing craft carried: 1 x SB90E for search and rescue, 1x 7 m (23 ft) RHIB, 1 x 4.8 metres (16 ft) RHIB
- Complement: 18 + aircrew and transients (Accommodation for up to 43 in total)
- Sensors & processing systems: 1 × Terma Scanter 4100 surface and air search radar; 3 × Furuno navigation radars; SAAB CEROS 200 radar and optronic tracking system and CWI illumination radar
- Armament: 2 StanFlex modules, with the following options each: 1 × 76 mm gun Mk M/85 LvSa gun, only in bow slot; 1 × Mk.48 or Mk.56 VLS fitting 6 or 12 RIM-162 ESSM surface-to-air missiles respectively; 8 × Harpoon Block II SSM in inclined launchers; MU90 Impact ASW-torpedo launcher; Others: 2 × 12.7 mm heavy machine gun M/01 LvSa
- Aviation facilities: Aft helicopter deck

The Knud Rasmussen class is a class of offshore patrol vessels operating in the Royal Danish Navy from 2008. Built to replace the Agdlek-class cutters on a one-for-one basis, the Knud Rasmussen-class vessels are significantly larger, enabling patrols further offshore.

The ships' normal tasks include fisheries inspections, environment protection, search and rescue, sovereignty enforcement, icebreaker assignments (Finnish-Swedish ice class 1A Super/Polar Class 6), towage and salvage operations and general assistance to the Danish and Greenland governments (including police tasks). The class has a helicopter deck aft behind the superstructure but lacks an aircraft hangar. However, it can perform Rotors running refueling and can thus increase the endurance and the range of the helicopter. The estimated cost of the third ship as of 2013 was 513 mill Dkr (US$ 81.6 million).

== Armament ==
The standard armament consists of two 12.7-millimetre (0.5 in) heavy machine guns. This is supplemented by the two Stanflex modular mission payload slots (one on the foredeck, the other aft of the superstructure), which can be fitted with a multi-purpose gun, surface-to-air missiles, or ASW torpedoes, along with other non-weapon payloads. Another two container positions are "prepared for" but not installed on the starboard and port sides of the heli deck.

== List of ships ==
Pennant number	Name	Int'l c/s	Shipyard	Laid down	Launched	In service	Christened by	Decommissioned
P570	Knud Rasmussen	OVFG	Karstensens Skibsværft	2005-11-21	2006-10-19	2008-02-18	-	-
P571	Ejnar Mikkelsen	OVFH	Karstensens Skibsværft	2006-11-10	2007-06-01	2009-01-16	-	-
P572	Lauge Koch	OVFI	Karstensens Skibsværft	2014-05-12	2015-04-20	2017-12-11	-	-
