= Thetis-class patrol vessel =

Danish naval ship class

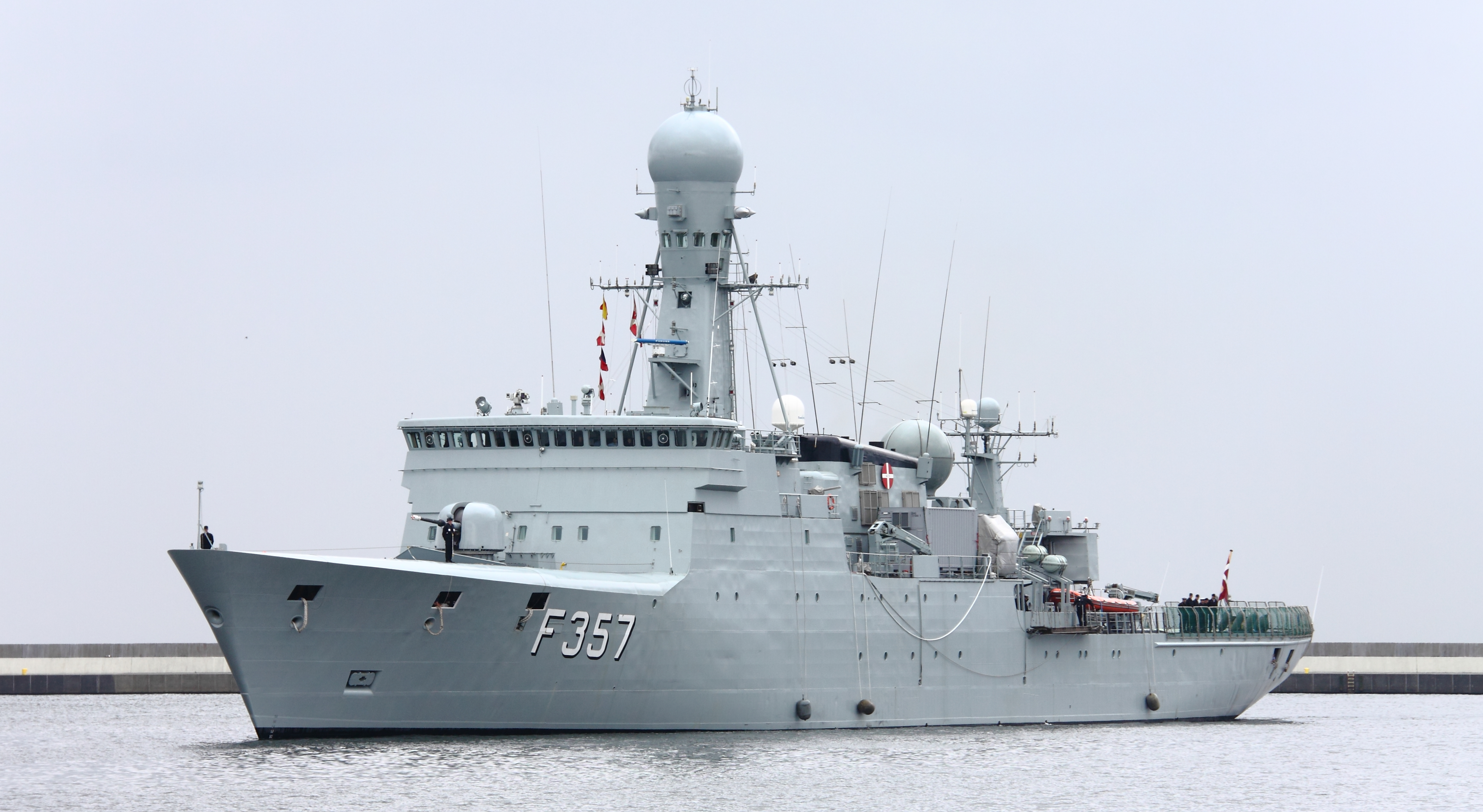
- HDMS Thetis

Class overview
- Name: Thetis class
- Builders: Svendborg Skibsværft
- Operators: Royal Danish Navy
- Preceded by: Hvidbjørnen class
- In commission: 1991–present
- Planned: 4
- Completed: 4
- Active: 4

General characteristics
- Type: Ocean patrol frigates
- Displacement: 3,500 tons, standard
- Length: 112.3 m (368 ft 5 in)
- Beam: 14.4 m (47 ft 3 in)
- Height: 37.0 m (121 ft 5 in)
- Draft: 6.0 m (19 ft 8 in)
- Ice class: DNV GL Ice-IA; Finnish-Swedish ice class IA equiv.
- Installed power: 3 × Detroit Diesel GM 16V 7163-7305 at 480 kW (640 hp); 1 × Detroit Diesel 6L-71N 1063-7005 at 120 kW (160 hp) (EMG)
- Propulsion: 3 × MAN B&W Diesel 12v28/32A-D at 2,940 kW (3,943 hp), single shaft; 1 × Brunvoll azimuth thruster (800 kW); 1 × electrical Brunvoll bow thruster (600 kW)
- Speed: 21.8 knots (40.4 km/h)
- Range: 8,700 nmi (16,112 km) at 15 kn (28 km/h)
- Endurance: 60 days
- Boats & landing craft carried: 2 x 7 m (23 ft) RHIBs
- Complement: 47-60 depending on role + aircrew etc.
- Sensors & processing systems: 1 × Terma Scanter Mil 009 navigational radar; 1 × Furuno FR-1505 DA surface search radar; 1 × Terma SCANTER 4103 air & surface search radar; 1 × SaabTech Vectronics 9LV 200 Mk 3 fire control system; 1 × SaabTech CTS-36 hull-mounted sonar; FLIR Systems AN/AAQ-22 SAFIRE thermal imager
- Armament: 3 StanFlex modules, 1 × OTO Melara 76 mm; 2 × 12.7 mm heavy; 2 × 7.62 mm light
- Aircraft carried: 1 x Sikorsky MH-60R helicopter
- Aviation facilities: Aft helicopter deck and hangar

The Thetis-class ocean patrol vessels or ocean patrol frigates, also called Stanflex 3000, is a class of large patrol vessels built for the Royal Danish Navy. The class comprises four ships, all built and commissioned in the early 1990s. The ships' tasks are mainly maintenance of sovereignty, search and rescue, fishery inspection and support to local (mainly Greenlandic) authorities. The operation areas are normally Greenland and the Faroe Islands, but the vessels also operate near Iceland on transit between Greenland and the Faroe Islands, and near Denmark.

== Design ==
The ships each have double-skinned ice-reinforced hulls so that the ships can break through 80 centimetres (31 in) of solid ice (DNV GL Ice-IA). Thetis has undergone a conversion, first to participate in the CANUMAS-project, and later to become the fleet's flagship, a role that ended in September 2007. Thetis is fitted with Terma C-Flex Combat Management System. The Danish Navy has retrofitted the vessels with 12.7-millimetre (0.50 in) heavy machine guns, Stinger launchers and decoy launching systems. The ships can carry and use three StanFlex mission modules, with one the bow (usually fitted with an OTO Melara 76 mm gun) and two amidships. In the meantime, the armament and sensors have been significantly reduced for cost reasons. All that remains of the armament is the 76 mm gun and a 12.7 mm machine gun.

In the most common role (ocean patrol), the standard base crew is 47 people and 16 conscripts, but in either command ship role or more warfare heavy roles, the base crew is expanded to 60 people plus 4 aircrew for the Westland Lynx Mk.90B and one or two doctors. Accommodation is available for 101 personnel in all.

The ships are assigned to the Navy's 1st Squadron, primarily tasked with the protection of waters around Greenland and the Faroe Islands.

== Planned replacement ==
After 2025 the Thetis-class vessels are planned for replacement by new MPV80-class vessels, built by Odense Maritime Technology and SH Defence. The new vessels will incorporate a modular concept enabling packages of different systems (for minehunting or minelaying for example) to be fitted to individual ships as may be required.

== List of ships ==
| Name | Pennant number | Int'l c/s | Shipyard | Laid down | Launched | In service | Christened by | Decommissioned |
|---|---|---|---|---|---|---|---|---|
| Thetis | F357 | OUEU | Svendborg Skibsværft | 10 October 1988 | 14 July 1989 | 1 July 1991 | Frederik, Crown Prince of Denmark | - |
| Triton | F358 | OUEV | Svendborg Skibsværft | 27 June 1989 | 16 March 1990 | 2 December 1991 | Poul Schlüter, Prime Minister of Denmark | - |
| Vædderen | F359 | OUEW | Svendborg Skibsværft | 19 March 1990 | 21 December 1990 | 9 June 1992 | Atli Dam, Prime Minister of the Faroe Islands | - |
| Hvidbjørnen | F360 | OUEX | Svendborg Skibsværft | 2 January 1991 | 11 October 1991 | 30 November 1992 | Lars Emil Johansen, Prime Minister of Greenland | - |
