= HDMS Hvidbjørnen =

Thetis-class patrol vessel of the Royal Danish Navy

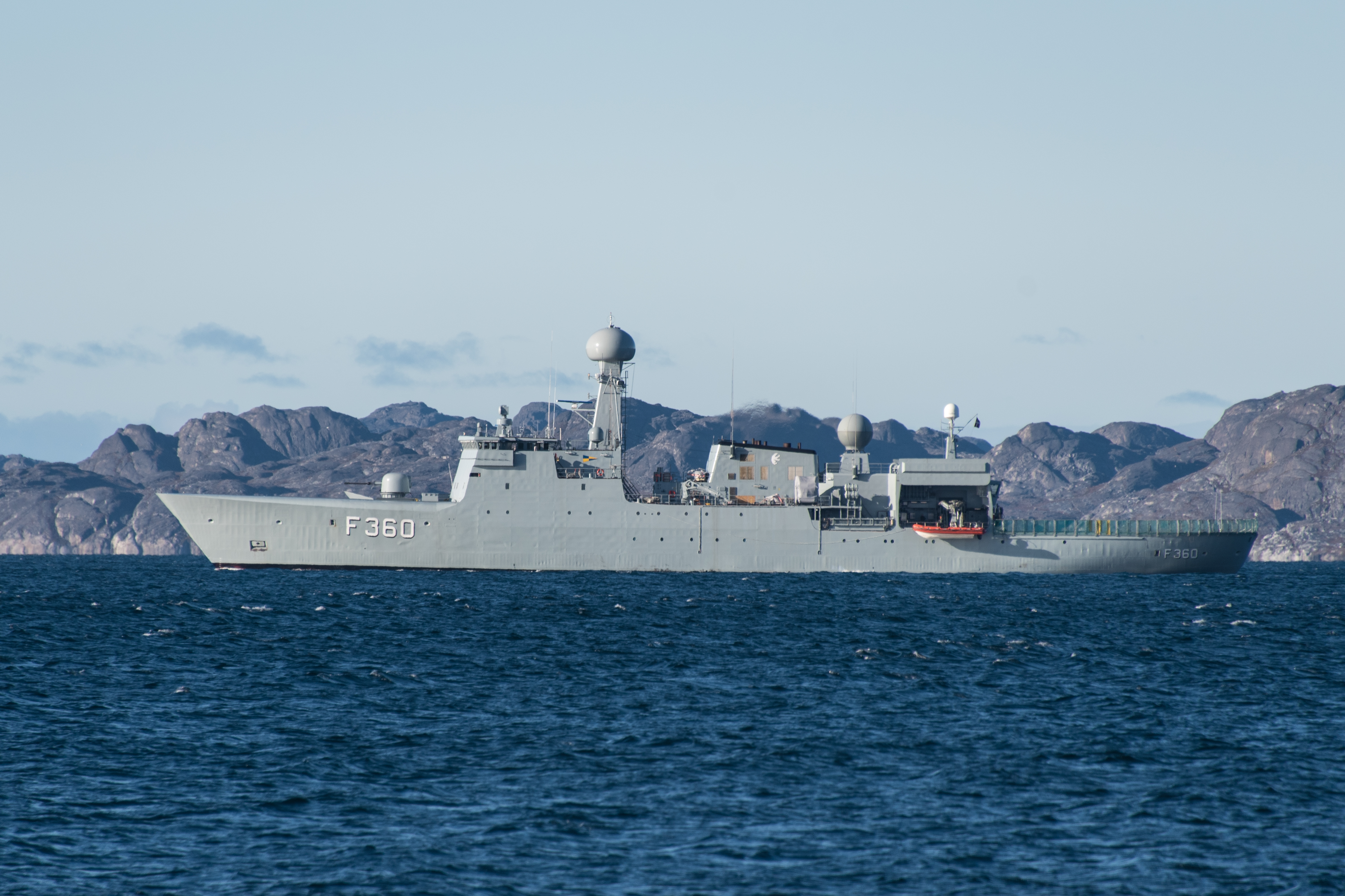
- HDMS Hvidbjørnen (F360) sailing off Nuuk, Greenland

History

Kingdom of Denmark
- Name: Hvidbjørnen
- Laid down: 2 January 1991
- Launched: 11 October 1991
- In service: 30 November 1992
- Identification: MMSI number: 219525000; Callsign: OUEX
- Badge

General characteristics
- Class & type: Thetis-class ocean patrol vessel
- Armament: 1 x 76-mm 62-cal. OTO Melara Super Rapid DP 7 x 12.7 mm heavy machine guns 4 x 7.62 mm light machine guns 1 x depth charge rack and MU90 Advanced Lightweight Torpedo for anti-submarine warfare
- Aircraft carried: 1 × Westland Lynx Mk90B. From approx. 2016: MH-60R

HDMS Hvidbjørnen (Hvidbjørnen is older Danish for polar bear) is a Thetis-class patrol vessel belonging to the Royal Danish Navy.

== Service ==
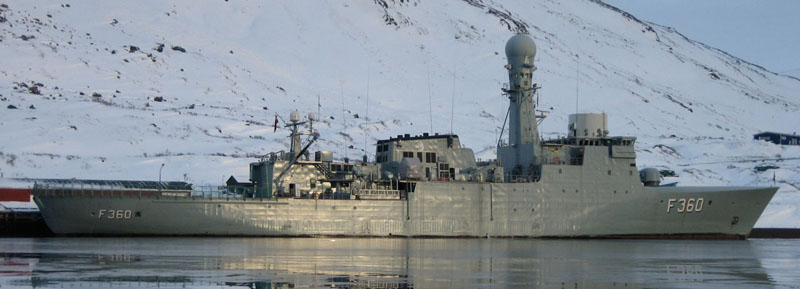
Hvidbjørnen. dockside at Danish Naval base at Kangilinnguit (formerly Grønnedal), Greenland

Hvidbjørnen served as a platform for the Commander of the Danish Task Group from 1998 to 2002, whereafter her sister ship Thetis assumed the role.

During a patrol in the waters of the Faroe Islands, the French trawler Bruix was suspected of illegal fishing. When approached by Hvidbjørnen, the French trawler refused to let an inspection team aboard and started sailing towards the territorial border. During the chase, the two ships collided. There were no injuries but the ships needed repairs.

Hvidbjørnen and Ejnar Mikkelsen participated alongside Danish air elements in sovereignty and Search and Rescue exercises off Greenland's west coast in 2009. The vessels' patrol took them to the Nares Strait, close to Hans Island, the approaches to the Northwest Passage, and to Lancaster Sound. In Lancaster Sound, they joined in a Search and Rescue exercise with the Canadian Coast Guard vessel, CCGS Henry Larsen.
