= HDMS Ejnar Mikkelsen =

2007 Knud Rasmussen-class patrol vessel

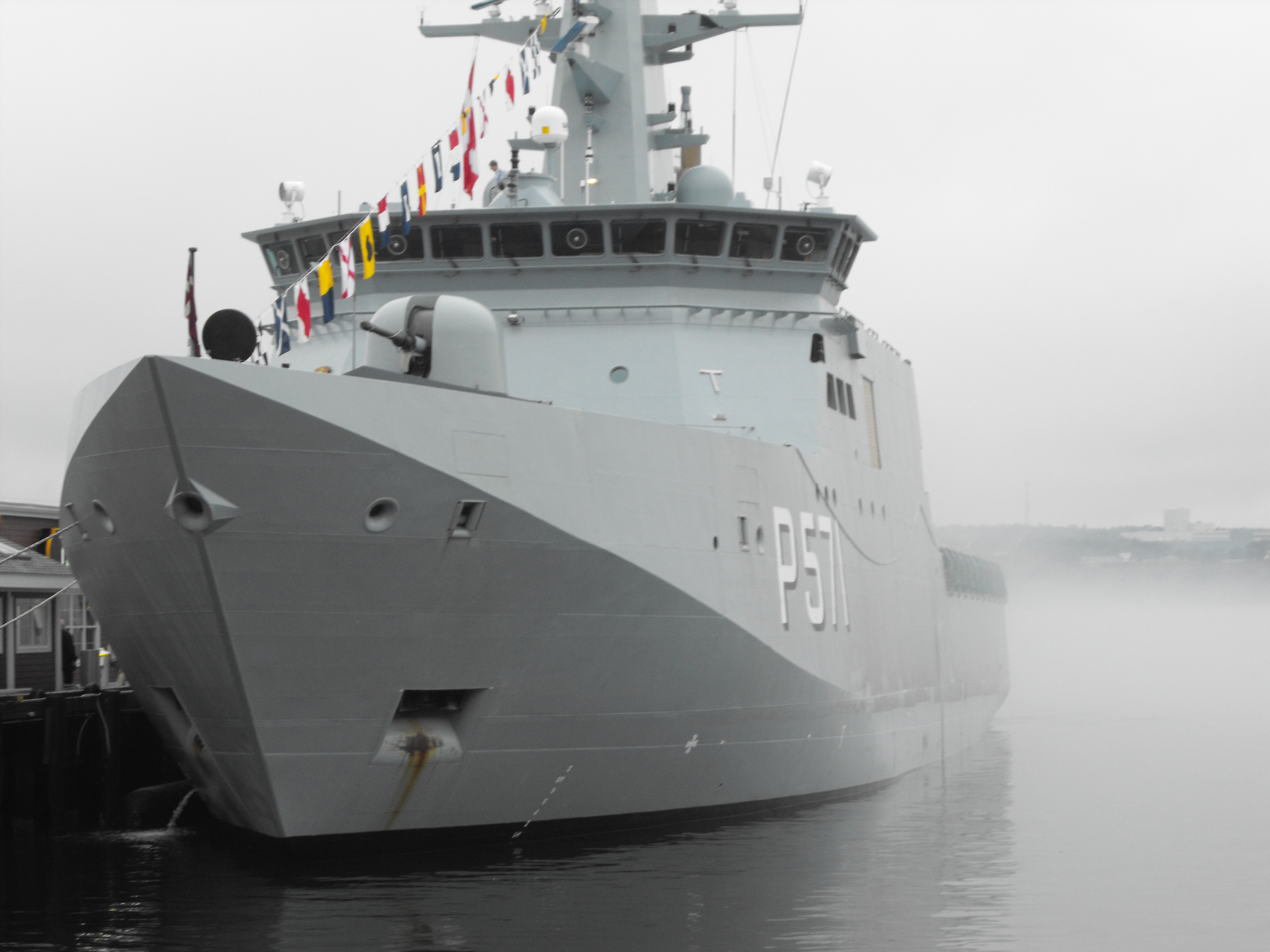
- HDMS Ejnar Mikkelsen In Halifax, Nova Scotia for the 100 year anniversary celebrations of the Royal Canadian Navy

History

Kingdom of Denmark
- Name: Ejnar Mikkelsen
- Namesake: Ejnar Mikkelsen
- Builder: Karstensens Skibsværft.; Hull is built at the Polish Stocznia Pólnocna (Northern Shipyard) in Gdansk
- Launched: 1 June 2007
- Commissioned: 16 January 2009
- Identification: MMSI number: 220429000; Callsign: OVFH
- Status: in active service, as of 2010

General characteristics
- Class & type: Knud Rasmussen-class patrol vessel
- Displacement: 1,720 long tons (1,748 t)
- Length: LOA 71.8 m (235 ft 7 in); LWL 61.0 m (200 ft 2 in)
- Beam: 14.6 m (47 ft 11 in)
- Draft: 4.9 m (16 ft 1 in)
- Propulsion: 2 × MAN B&W Diesel ALPHA 8L27/38 generating 2,720 kW (3,650 hp) each
- Speed: Less than 17 knots (31 km/h; 20 mph)
- Range: 3,000 nautical miles (5,600 km)
- Boats & landing craft carried: 1 × SB90E for Search and rescue; 1 × 7m (60 HP) RHIB; 1 × 4.8m (45 HP) RHIB
- Complement: 18 + aircrew and transients (Accommodation for up to 43 in total)
- Sensors & processing systems: 1 × Terma Scanter 4100 surface and air search radar; 3 × Furuno navigation radars; SAAB CEROS 200 radar and optronic tracking system and CWI illumination radar
- Armament: 1 × 76 mm Gun Mk M/85 LvSa; 2 × 12.7 mm Heavy Machine Gun M/01 LvSa; RIM-162 Evolved Sea Sparrow Missile surface-to-air missiles; MU90 Impact ASW torpedo
- Aviation facilities: Aft helicopter deck, no hangar

HDMS Ejnar Mikkelsen is a Royal Danish Navy patrol vessel. Launched in November 2007, she is the second vessel of the Knud Rasmussen class. The normal patrol area of the Ejnar Mikkelsen, and her sister ships, will be the waters around Greenland.

== Operational history ==
The HDMS Hvidbjørnen and the Ejnar Mikkelsen participated with Danish air elements in sovereignty and Search and Rescue exercises off Greenland's west coast in September 2009. The vessels patrol took them to the Nares Strait, close to Hans Island, the approaches to the Northwest Passage, and to Lancaster Sound. In Lancaster Sound they joined in a Search and Rescue exercise with the Canadian Coast Guard vessel the CCGS Henry Larsen.

In September 2025, the Ejnar Mikkelsen took part in the NATO Arctic Light exercise off Greenland.

== Gallery ==
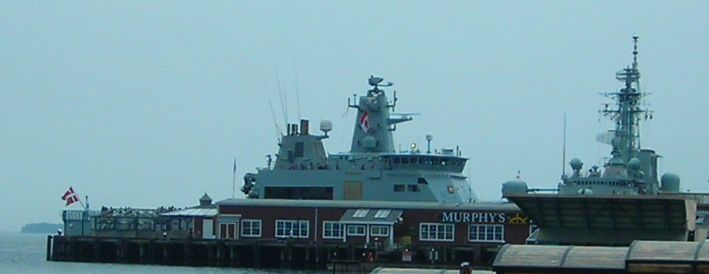
The HDMS Ejnar Mikkelsen anchored in Halifax, Canada, in 2010.
