= Rotors running refueling =

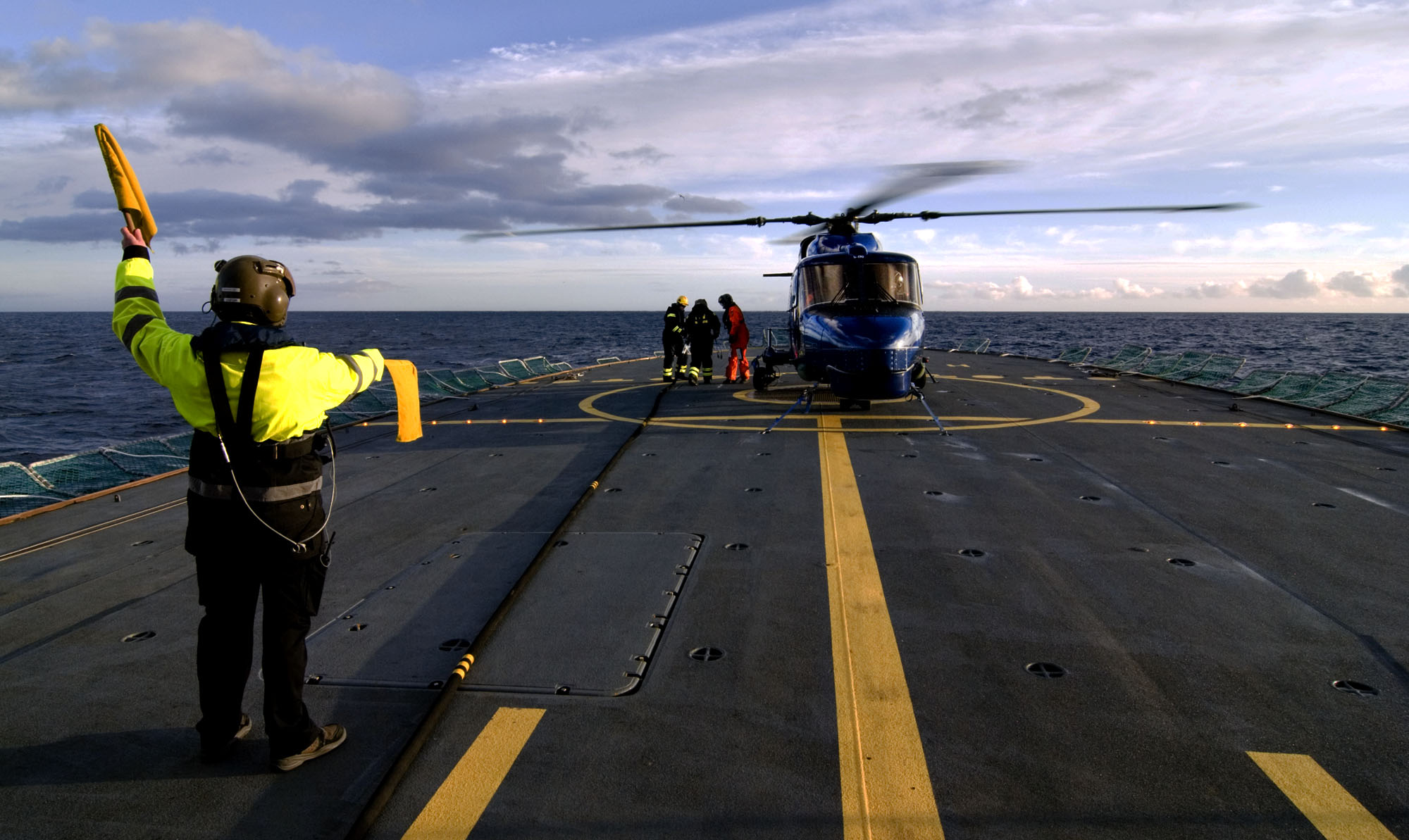
Rotors running refuelling on board a naval vessel

Rotors running refuelling (usually shortened to RRR and pronounced Triple-Romeo) is the act of refuelling a helicopter, while the helicopter keeps rotors (and thus engines) running. Unlike Helicopter in-flight refuelling, RRR can only be performed on ships or helipads, which can support the given helicopter.
