= HDMS Thetis (F357) =

Thetis-class ocean patrol vessel

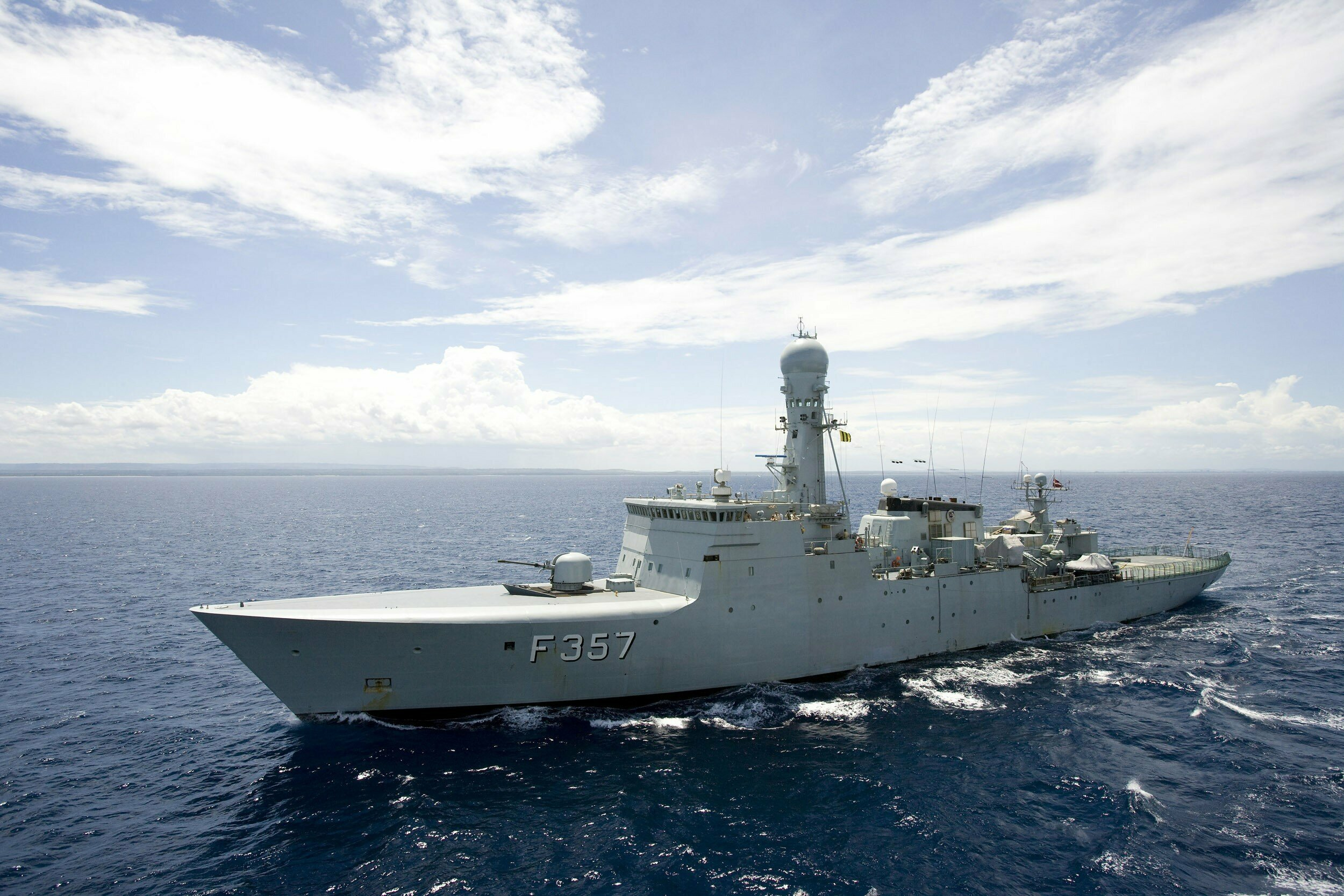
- HDMS Thetis on anti-pirate duties off the coast of Kenya, 2008.

History

Kingdom of Denmark
- Name: Thetis
- Laid down: 10 October 1988
- Launched: 14 July 1989
- In service: 1 July 1991
- Identification: IMO number: 3993600; MMSI number: 219522000; Callsign: OUEU
- Status: in active service

General characteristics
- Class & type: Thetis-class frigate
- Type: Off Shore Patrol Frigates
- Displacement: 3,500 tons full load
- Length: 112.3 m (368 ft 5 in)
- Beam: 14.4 m (47 ft 3 in)
- Height: 37.0 m (121 ft 5 in)
- Draft: 6.0 m (19 ft 8 in)
- Installed power: 3 Detroit Diesel GM 16V 7163-7305 à 460; 1 Detroit Diesel 6L-71N 1063-7005 à 120 kW (EMG)
- Propulsion: 3 × MAN B&W Diesel 12v28/32A-D à 2940 kW (3990 hk), single shaft; 1 Brunvoll azimuth thruster (800 kW); 1 electrical Brunvoll bow thruster (600 kW)
- Speed: >21.8 knots (40.4 km/h; 25.1 mph)
- Range: 8.700 nautical miles (16.112 km; 10.012 mi) at 15 knots (28 km/h; 17 mph)
- Endurance: 60 days
- Boats & landing craft carried: 2 7m RHIBs
- Complement: 52 + aircrew and transients (accommodation for up to 101 in total)
- Sensors & processing systems: 1 Terma Scanter Mil 009 navigational radar; 1 Furuno FR-1505 DA surface search radar; 1 Plessey AWS-6 air search radar; 1 SaabTech Vectronics 9LV 200 Mk 3 fire control system; 1 SaabTech CTS-36 hull-mounted sonar; Thales TMS 2640 Salmon variable depth sonar; FLIR Systems AN/AAQ-22 SAFIRE thermal imager
- Electronic warfare & decoys: 1 Thales Defense Ltd Cutlass radar warning receiver; 1 Thales Defense Scorpion radar jammer; 2 Sea Gnat launchers (for chaff and flares)
- Armament: 1 76-mm 62-cal. OTO Melara Super Rapid DP; 7 12.7 mm heavy machine guns; 4 7.62 mm light machine guns; 1 depth charge rack and MU90 Advanced Lightweight Torpedo for anti-submarine warfare
- Aircraft carried: 1 Westland Lynx Mk.90B helicopter. From approx. 2016: MH-60R
- Aviation facilities: Aft helicopter deck and hangar

HDMS Thetis is a Thetis-class ocean patrol vessel belonging to the Royal Danish Navy.

In mid-1990s the ship served as a platform for seismic operations in the waters near Greenland. In 2002 she took over the role from her sister ship Hvidbjørnen as a platform for Commander Danish Task Group. The role was handed over to Absalon in September 2007.

February - April 2008 Thetis served as a protection vessel against pirates for the World Food Programme chartered ships, carrying food aid, off the Horn of Africa. A squad of soldiers from the Frogman Corps was deployed aboard the ship.

In 2009 the ship served as staff ship for the NATO Mine Countermeasure Group 1.

In September 2025, the Thetis took part in the NATO Arctic Light exercise off Greenland.

== Gallery ==
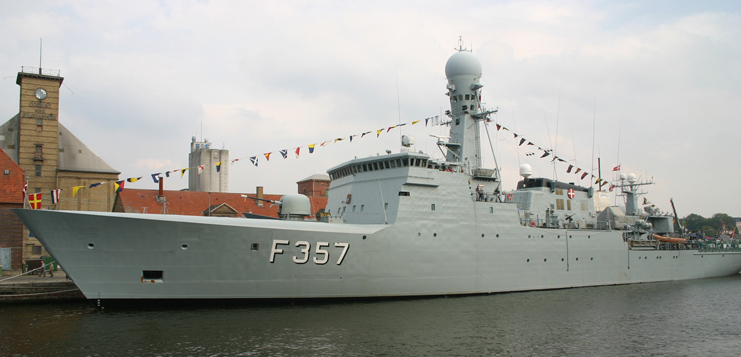
HDMS Thetis (F357) dockside in Odense Harbour, December 2006
