= Flyvefisken-class patrol vessel =

Warships of the Royal Danish Navy

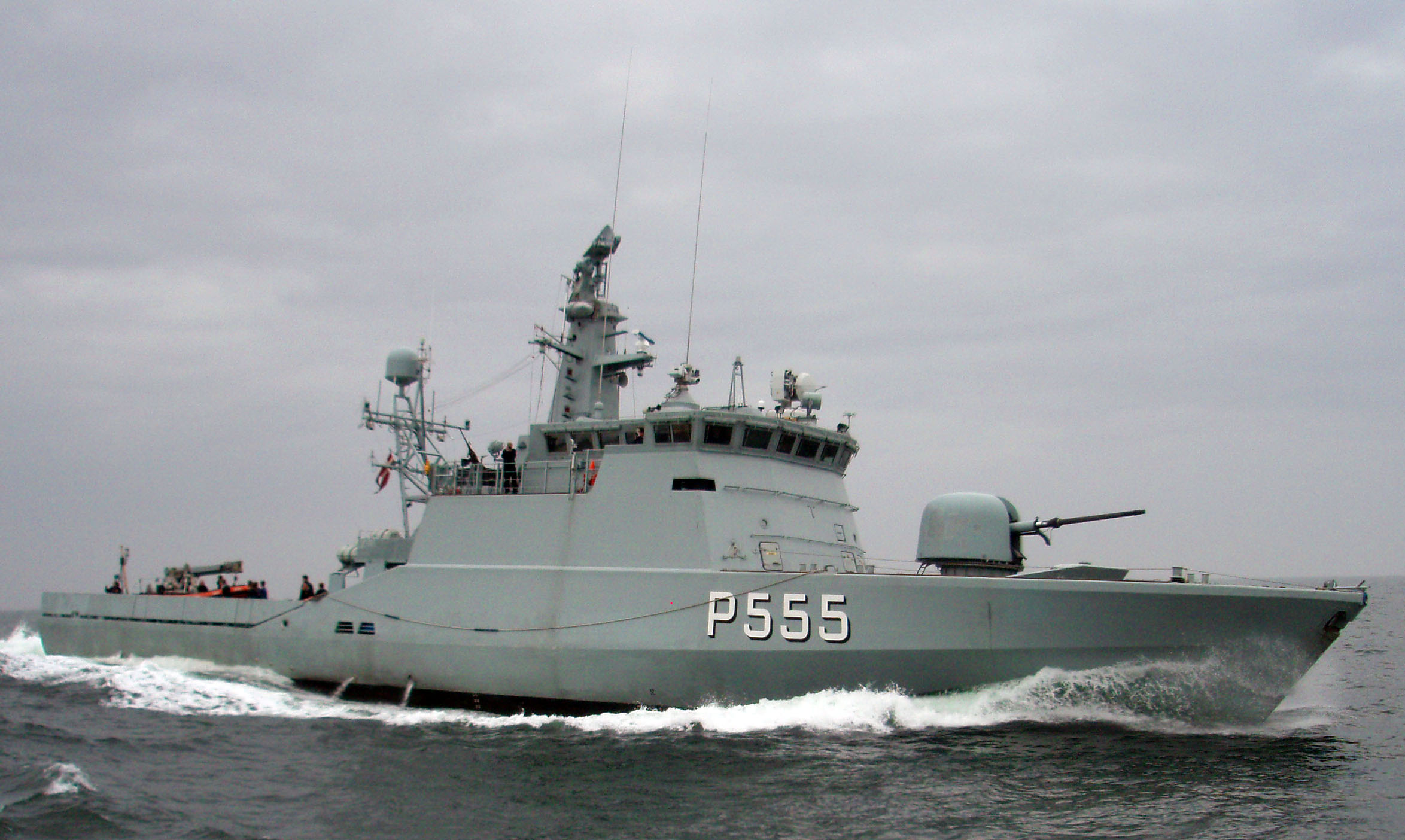
- HDMS Støren

Class overview
- Name: Flyvefisken class
- Operators: Royal Danish Navy; Lithuanian Naval Force; Portuguese Navy
- Subclasses: Tejo class (Portugal)
- Built: 1985–1995
- In commission: 1989–present
- Planned: 17
- Completed: 14
- Canceled: 3
- Active: 9
- Retired: 1
- Preserved: 3 (for sale)

General characteristics
- Type: Patrol vessel
- Displacement: 320 t (310 long tons) light; 450 t (440 long tons) full load
- Length: 54 m (177 ft 2 in)
- Beam: 9 m (29 ft 6 in)
- Draught: 2.5 m (8 ft 2 in)
- Propulsion: Combined diesel and gas; 1 × General Electric LM500 gas turbine 4,066 kW (5,453 hp); 2 × MTU 16V 396TB94 diesels 4,226 kW (5,667 hp) total; 1 × auxiliary GM 12V-71 diesel, 373 kW (500 hp) hydraulic propulsion; 3 × auxiliary GM 6-71 diesel generators
- Speed: 30 knots (56 km/h; 35 mph) on turbine + diesels; 20 knots (37 km/h; 23 mph) on MTUs; 7 knots (13 km/h; 8.1 mph) on hydraulic drive
- Range: 3,860 nmi (7,150 km) at 18 kn (33 km/h; 21 mph)
- Complement: 19-29 depending on role
- Sensors & processing systems: Terma Scanter Mil 009 surveillance radar; Thales TMS 2640 Salmon variable depth sonar; Furuno navigational radar; EADS TRS-3D air search radar (Combat role); Plessey AWS-6 air search radar (MCM role); Saab 9LV 200 Mk 3 Fire control radar
- Armament: 4 StanFlex modules, with the following options: 8 × launchers for Boeing RGM-84 Harpoon Block II SSM; 12 × launchers Sea Sparrow SAM; 1 × OTO Melara 76 mm/62 gun; 4 × 323 mm (12.7 in) MU90 ASW torpedoes; Crane for deployment of 60 deck-carried naval mines; Other armament; 2 × 12.7 mm machine guns

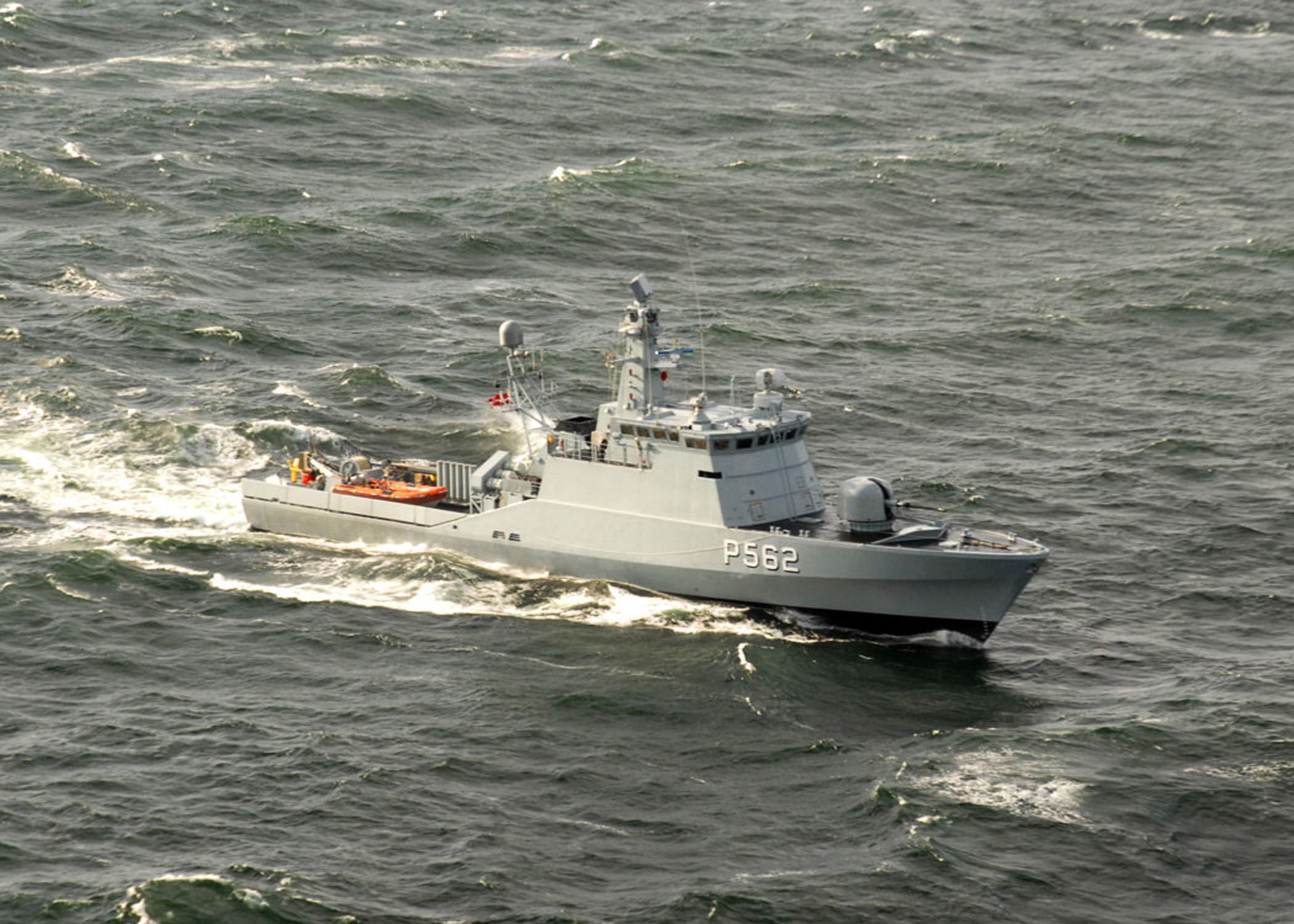
HDMS Viben

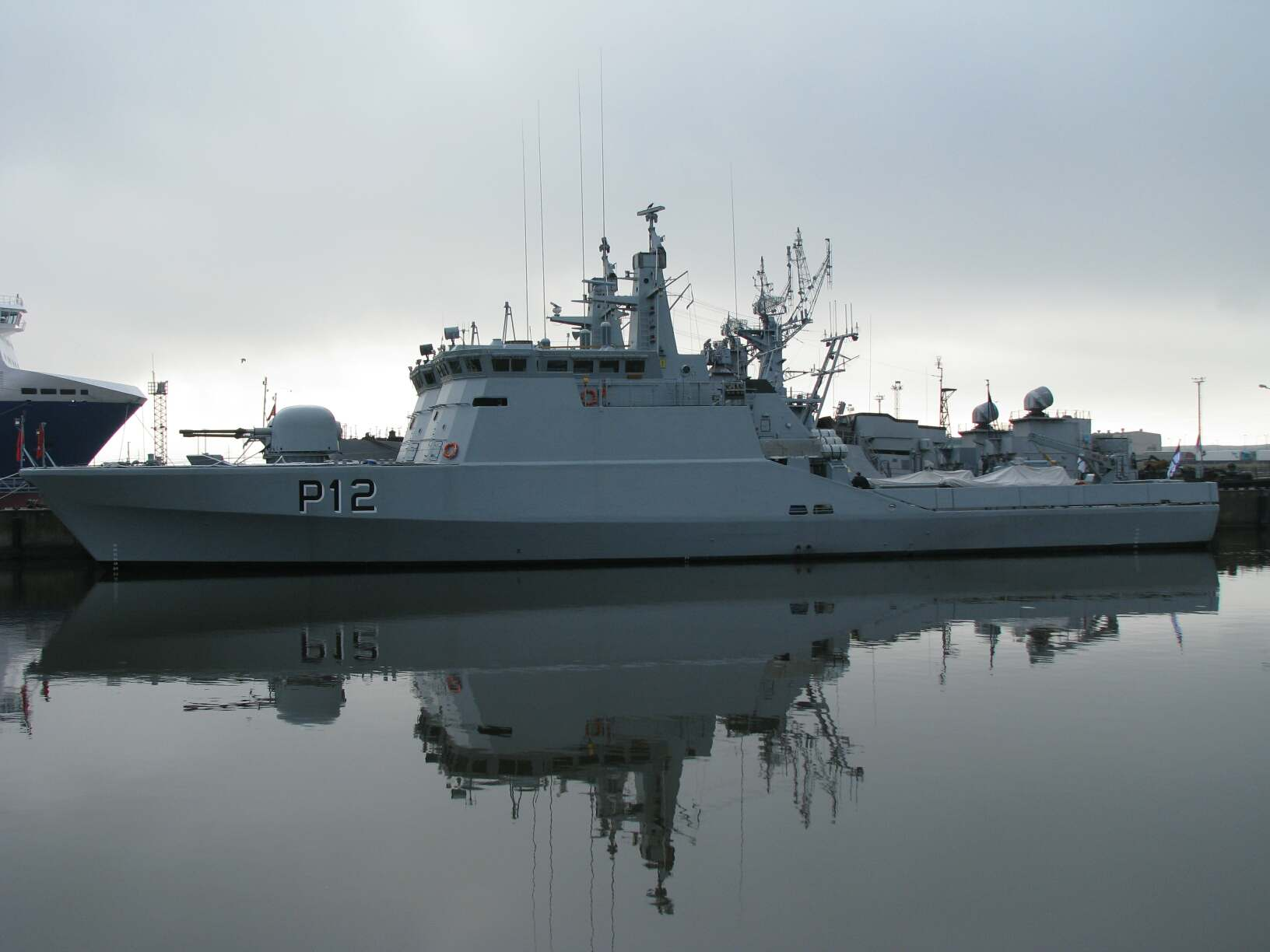
LVS Dzūkas

The Flyvefisken-class patrol vessels ("Flying fish" in Danish) are warships of the Royal Danish Navy. The class is also known as the Standard Flex 300 or SF300 class. The five vessels sold to the Portuguese Navy are locally referred as Tejo class.

== Containerised weapon systems ==
The Flyvefisken ships were constructed using an innovative modular design known as StanFlex: they have a standard hull in which containerised weapons or systems can be placed. This allows them to rapidly change roles, typically in 48 hours. The containers measure 3.5 by 3 by 2.5 metres (11.5 ft × 9.8 ft × 8.2 ft). One container is situated on the foredeck; the other three go on the quarterdeck behind the superstructure and funnel. Possible configurations include:

- Surveillance: Two storage modules, one of which with a RHIB above deck, one crane module for deploying the RHIB, one module with a 76mm gun
- Combat: One module with a 76mm gun, one module with RIM-7 Sea Sparrow anti-air missiles, one module with Boeing RGM-84 Harpoon missiles, one module with MU90 Impact torpedoes
- Minelayer: One module with a 76mm gun, one module with RIM-7 Sea Sparrow anti-air missiles, one storage module with a RHIB above deck, one crane module for deploying the RHIB or mines, 60 mines on deck-mounted rails
- Pollution control: Two storage modules, one of which with a RHIB above deck, one crane module for deploying the RHIB or specialized equipment, one module with a multipurpose winch
- Antisubmarine warfare: One module with a 76mm gun, one storage module with a RHIB above deck, one crane module for deploying the RHIB, one module with a TSM 2640 Salmon variable-depth active/passive sonar
- Mine countermeasures/minehunter (MCM): One module with a 76mm gun, one module with RIM-7 Sea Sparrow anti-air missiles, one module for control of MSF and MRD class drone minehunters, one crane module for deploying deck-carried ROVs

The structure of the ships is built using a sandwich material, consisting of a layer of fiberglass either side of a core of PVC cell foam. This building method helps reduce maintenance costs, and is used to this day on the new Diana and -Holm class ships.

== Comparison with replaced vessels ==
The Flyvefisken class replaced three different vessels in the Danish Navy: Six torpedo boats of the Søløven class (1965–1990), six coastal minesweepers of the Sund class (1955–1999) and eight seaward defence craft of the Daphne class (1961–1991). It was possible because of the containerised systems and modern technology.

The Søløven boats were light plywood boats propelled by three turboshafts, which attacked the enemy ships with torpedoes in 54-knot (100 km/h; 62 mph) hit-and-run attacks. The Flyvefisken class is not as fast itself, but compensates for this by using longer-ranged and faster Harpoon missiles as its anti-ship weapon of choice.

The Sund-class minesweepers were built of wood, bronze and other non-magnetic materials. They swept mine fields by trawling through the area with paravanes on tow separating magnetic and acoustic generators for the bottom mines, and chain cutters for the horned mines. The Flyvefisken class instead locates the mines with side-scan sonar and neutralizes them one by one with a ROV, improving safety of the ship and crew.

The Daphne class attacked submarines by dropping depth charges while passing over the submarine. The Flyvefisken class uses MU90 homing torpedoes instead, allowing for standoff attacks.

== Vessels in Portuguese Service ==
Four vessels of the class (Glenten, Ravnen, Skaden and Viben) were acquired by the Portuguese Navy in 2010 and re-named Mondego, Douro, Guadiana and Tejo. A fifth vessel, Gribben, was also acquired by the service as a spare parts hull. After a period of upgrade and reconfiguration, Mondego and Tejo were specifically tasked to police Portugal's exclusive economic zone around Madeira.

In 2023, 13 sailors assigned to Mondego were relieved of their duties when they refused to board the ship claiming her to be unseaworthy. The navy rejected the claim, which was made after the vessel had been tasked to monitor a Russian ship sailing in the vicinity of Madeira.

== Ships in class ==
A total of 14 ships were built in the class, in three series:

| # | Name | Laid down | Launched | Commissioned | Decommissioned | Int. Callsign | Role |
|---|---|---|---|---|---|---|---|
Series 1
| P550 | Flyvefisken (Flying fish) | 15 August 1985 | 26 April 1986 | 19 December 1989 | Sold to Lithuania, March 2007 - LVS Žemaitis (P 11) | OVDA | MCM |
| P551 | Hajen (Shark) | February 1988 | 6 August 1989 | 19 August 1990 | Sold to Lithuania, March 2007 - LVS Dzūkas (P 12) | OVDB | MCM |
| P552 | Havkatten (Catfish) | August 1988 | 13 January 1990 | 1 November 1990 | 12 January 2012 - Sold to Lithuania, 23 November 2016 - LVS Sėlis (P 15) | OVDC | MCM |
| P553 | Laxen (Salmon) | March 1988 | 20 May 1990 | 12 March 1991 | 7 October 2010 | OVDD | MCM |
| P554 | Makrelen (Mackerel) | December 1988 | 8 January 1991 | 4 October 1991 | 7 October 2010 | OVDE | MCM |
| P555 | Støren (Sturgeon) | August 1989 | 1 September 1991 | 24 April 1992 | 7 October 2010 | OVBF | MCM |
| P556 | Sværdfisken (Swordfish) | - | 1 September 1991 | 1 February 1992 | 2 August 2006, scrapped | OVDG | MCM |
Series 2
| P557 | Glenten (Kite) | - | 1992 | 1 February 1992 | 7 October 2010; Sold to Portugal, October 2014 - NRP Mondego (P 592) | OVDH | Combat |
| P558 | Gribben (Vulture) | - | 1992 | 1 July 1993 | 7 October 2010; Sold to Portugal, October 2014 - as spare parts hull | OVDI | Surveillance |
| P559 | Lommen (Loon) | - | 1993 | 21 January 1994 | Sold to Lithuania, March 2007 - LVS Aukštaitis (P 14) | OVDJ | Surveillance |
| P560 | Ravnen (Raven) | - | 1994 | 7 October 1994 | 7 October 2010; Sold to Portugal, October 2014 - NRP Douro (P 591) | OVDK | Combat |
| P561 | Skaden (European magpie) | - | 1994 | 10 April 1995 | 7 October 2010; Sold to Portugal, October 2014 - NRP Guadiana (P 593) | OVDL | Combat |
| P562 | Viben (Northern lapwing) | - | 1995 | 15 January 1996 | 7 October 2010; Sold to Portugal, October 2014 - NRP Tejo (P 590) | OVDM | Combat |
Series 3
| P563; Y311 | Søløven (Sea lion) | - | 1995 | 27 May 1996 | - | OVDN | Surveillance; Diving support from 2012 |

The difference between the series is mainly in the configuration of the propulsion system. Series 2 is not equipped with hydraulic propulsion, but instead has an additional auxiliary engine, and Series 3 has one further auxiliary engine.
