= Refit =

Modification to a watercraft

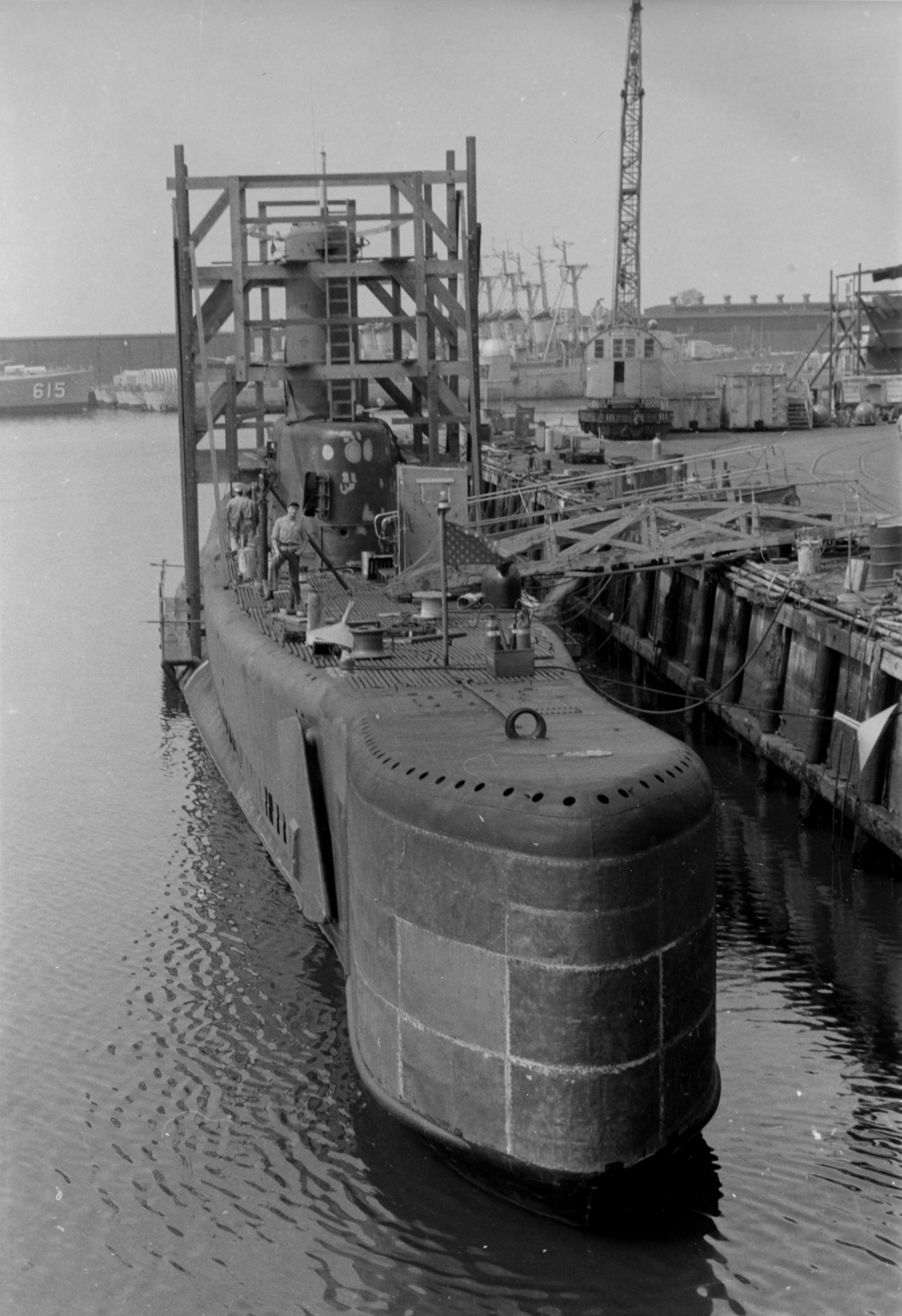
The submarine USS Angler during a refit in 1962

Refitting or refit of boats and marine vessels includes repairing, fixing, restoring, renewing, mending, and renovating an old vessel. Refitting has become one of the most important activities inside a shipyard. It offers a variety of services for an old vessel of any size and kind starting with the construction itself and what is added to it, such as hardware, electric & hydraulic systems, entertainment systems, etc.

Ship refits can range from relatively small changes to and including cutting the ship in half to facilitate near-total overhauls and redesign of interior spaces and modification or replacement of engines, systems or other equipment.

Refitting can be divided into several main subjects:

- Adding or replacing: for example replacing old deck equipment with new or refurbished ones.
- Modifying: for example modifying a yacht for participating in winning a regatta.
- Customizing: for example customizing a yacht for the owner's needs and desires.
- Modernizing: for example modernizing an old yacht with modern styling, technologies and systems.
- Restoring: for example restoring an old wooden boat for preservation.

== Examples ==
Examples of recent ship refits include:

- Pacific Encounter, a P&O Cruises Australia ship, was refitted in a Singapore dry dock in early 2021. Over 250 contractors spent 84,000 work hours just on painting 5,000 m^{2} (54,000 sq ft) of walls and ceilings and fitting 14,000 m^{2} (150,000 sq ft) of new carpet, following an earlier wet dock period where more extensive refurbishment was done to the interior.
- Refit of Carnival Victory in Cadiz, Spain in 2021, after which the ship is expected to be renamed Carnival Radiance in late 2021.

== See also ==
- Retrofitting
