= Auxiliary power =

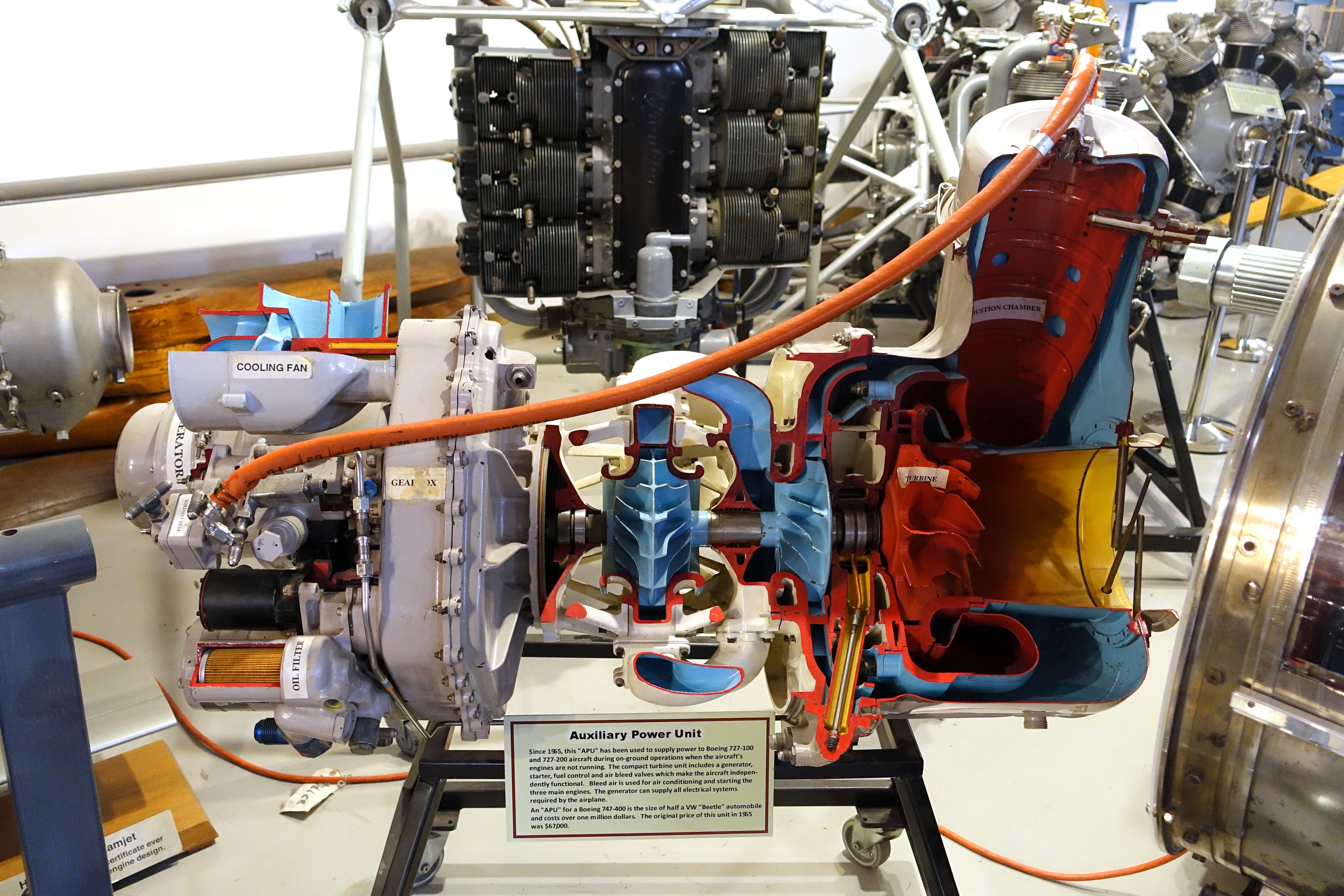

Auxiliary power is electric power that is provided by an alternate source and that serves as backup for the primary power source at the station main bus or prescribed sub-bus.

An offline unit provides electrical isolation between the primary power source and the critical technical load whereas an online unit does not.

A Class A power source is a primary power source, i.e., a source that assures an essentially continuous supply of power.

Types of auxiliary power services include Class B, a standby power plant to cover extended outages of the order of days; Class C, a 10-to-60-second quick-start unit to cover short-term outages of the order of hours; and Class D, an uninterruptible non-break unit using stored energy to provide continuous power within specified voltage and frequency tolerances.

== Uses and implementations ==
Many uses and implementations of auxiliary power are experimented with to increase its efficiency. One such experimentation was to find a better way to operate a diesel engine with fuel cell based auxiliary power units. The method of which is to separate hydrogen-rich gas from the diesel fuel to generate electricity separately in an auxiliary power unit. With this process, an effective reduction in emissions can be achieved by lowering the consumed volume of gas per hour. However, upon power demands reaching 60% a sharp decrease in performance occurs, which can be solved by using a diesel or kerosine fuel with a maximum CO concentration of 1.5%.

There are a variety of other implementations of auxiliary power units in energy systems. This explains for how a significant portion of emissions come from commercial vehicles. Diesel engines operating within densely populated areas, running within an ineffective range in order to power their auxiliary systems, such as refrigeration, are contributors to a large portion of the emissions from automobiles. Using a model with a diesel powered four-stroke engine on a truck with 100% load capacity driving a combination of typical urban and city road cycles, emissions and auxiliary power demand were recorded. Then by using the calculated auxiliary power demand, a source was developed to support the demand for the auxiliary systems in the form of a PEM fuel cell. The end product of the PEM fuel cell was able to support the auxiliary systems of the truck using a maximum of 5 kW of power. This input was able to sustain the cooling chamber, cabin air-conditioning, radio unit, etc. The introduction of this fuel cell also contributed to a 9% reduction in diesel fuel consumption and 9.6% reduction in CO_{2} emissions.

== Legal requirements for industries ==
The United States Environmental Protection Agency has set out rules and guidelines for how auxiliary and supplemental power sources (ASPS) that provide secondary power to wastewater treatment plants in case of a blackout. ASPS should be able to supply enough power to run the plant effectively, and be available for start-up in a short period of time in case of emergency. Types of ASPS necessary for adequate power generation include: internal combustion engines, microturbines, solar cells, fuel cells, and wind turbines. ASPS technology is required to be reliable enough to start up quickly, and run for extended periods of time, (i.e. 48 hours or more) with sufficient fuel.

== Efficiency ==
As previously affirmed, auxiliary power units are commonly used to improve the efficiency of electrical system. The use of auxiliary power units for range extended electric automobiles has been shown to improve the control of energy flow and distribution throughout the system, improving its overall efficiency.

For closed systems with extreme power consumption such as tankers and other vessels at sea, the use and quality of auxiliary power systems have a great impact on the efficiency of the overall system. The different uses of auxiliary power for an array of ships and ship activities and how these different power schemes change the overall efficiency and/emissions of the ship's system. Studies have indicated that while ships travel between ports within the same bay, total ship exhaust emissions are due to primarily their auxiliary boiler and auxiliary engine power systems, due to the time and speed required to transit the port waters with the large berth of the vessel. Findings also lead to the conclusion that the power output capabilities of auxiliary engines at a certain point do not increase with the size of the vessel, or the vessel's installed main engine power. There are a great many factors such as machinery variables, power schemes, and size and power of vessels, that there are too many factors to take into account in order to portray an accurate representation of the ratio between main power and auxiliary power output. More surveys and studies should be done in order to achieve this more accurate result.

== See also ==
- distributed generation
