= Bosch Rexroth =

German engineering firm

Bosch Rexroth AG

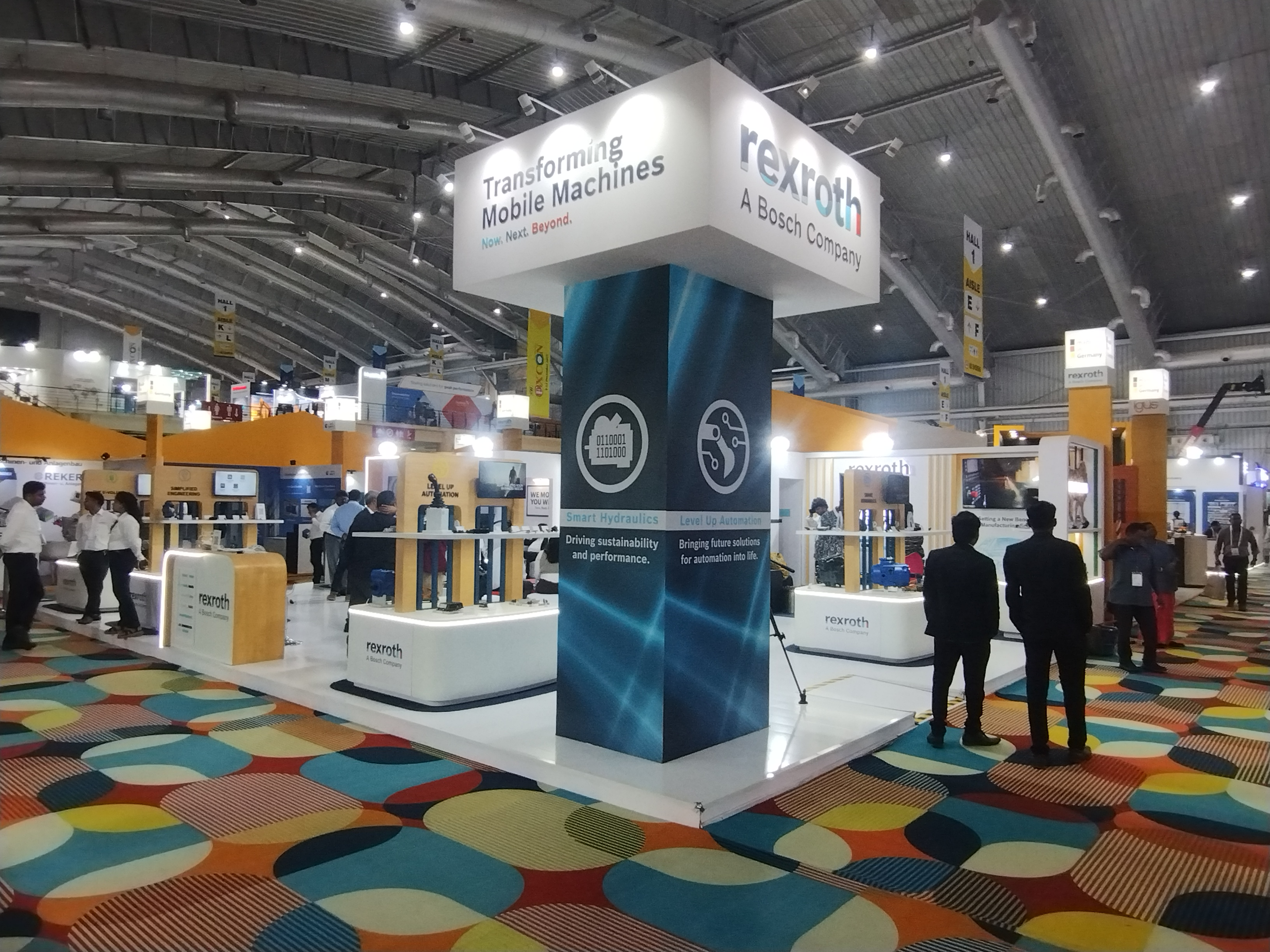
- Rexroth at EXCON 2025, BIEC
- Type: AG
- Industry: Mobile applications, machinery applications and engineering, factory automation
- Founded: 1 May 2001
- Headquarters: Lohr am Main, Germany
- Key people: Dr. Jochen Peter; Chairman of the Executive Board
- Products: Hydraulics, Electric Drives & Controls, Tightening Systems, Linear Motion, Assembly Technologies
- Revenue: €6.5 billion (2025)
- Number of employees: 31,900 (2025)
- Parent: Robert Bosch GmbH
- Website: boschrexroth.com

Bosch Rexroth AG is an engineering firm based in Lohr am Main in Germany. It is the result of a merger on 1 May 2001, between Mannesmann Rexroth AG and the Automation Technology Business Unit of Robert Bosch GmbH, and is a wholly owned subsidiary of Robert Bosch GmbH. Bosch Rexroth employs 31,900 people worldwide, and achieved total revenue of 6.5 billion euro in 2025.

In 2011 Bosch Rexroth acquired the hydraulic motor business formerly owned by Hägglund & Söner. The company maintains a manufacturing base in the Swedish town of Örnsköldsvik that was the home of Hägglund & Söner, and still manufactures products using the Hägglunds brand.

Bosch Rexroth invested in Neura Robotics, an artificial intelligence robotics company based in Metzingen, in June 2026. The investment was part of a series C $1.4 billion funding round. Shortly after the investment, Neura Robotics acquired Bosch Rexroth's Active Shuttle autonomous driverless automobile system, purchasing the hardware and software.

== Products and markets ==
Bosch Rexroth manufactures products and systems associated with the control and motion of industrial and mobile equipment, including the Hägglunds Drive Systems range shaft-mounted hydraulic motors.

In 2017, the company announced a partnership with Trumpf and Heraeus to build servo valves using the former's TruPrint 5000 laser powder additive manufacturing machines to build a servo valve.

The company has a manufacturing facility in Bethlehem, Pennsylvania, where they design and produce industrial hydraulic components for use in manufacturing machinery. In 2026, they opened a logistics campus at the site.

== Elmo Motion Control ==
Elmo Motion Control
- Type: Subsidiary
- Industry: Motion control
- Founded: 1988
- Founder: Haim Monhait
- Headquarters: Petah Tikva, Israel
- Key people: Ronen Boneh (CEO)
- Products: Servo Drives (single & multi-axes); Motion Controllers; Integrated Drives & Motors; Power Supplies
- Number of employees: 400
- Parent: Bosch Rexroth
- Website: www.elmomc.com

Elmo Motion Control is an engineering company specializing in developing, producing, and selling hardware and software in motion control. The company is based in Petah Tikva, Israel. In September 2022, it was announced that Elmo Motion Control would be acquired by Bosch Rexroth, with the acquisition completed on 30 November 2022.

Elmo Motion Control was established in 1988 by Haim Monhait. Four years later, in 1992, the company expanded its operations by opening its first subsidiary in the United States. In 2008, Elmo acquired and merged with Control Solutions (Pitronot Bakara). In 2015, the company opened an additional production facility in Warsaw, Poland, to meet growing demand. Over the years, Elmo expanded its global presence by establishing eight additional subsidiaries worldwide. These include operations in China, Europe, and the APAC region. A subsidiary was opened in Singapore in 2019.

Elmo's products are for various industries, such as semiconductors, lasers, robots, drones, life sciences, industrial automation, and extreme environments. Elmo Motion Control manufactures servo drives for various motion requirements, from industrial applications to extreme applications designed for harsh environments. As of 2023, Elmo had developed three generations of Titanium Maestro motion controller.
