= General Electric LM500 =

LM500
- Type: Gas turbine
- National origin: United States
- Manufacturer: GE Aviation
- Major applications: Flyvefisken class patrol vessel
- Developed from: General Electric TF34

The General Electric LM500 is an industrial and marine gas turbine produced by GE Aviation.

The LM500 is a derivative of the General Electric TF34 aircraft engine. Current versions of the LM500 deliver 6,000 shaft horsepower (4.47 MW) with a thermal efficiency of 31 percent at ISO conditions. It has been used in various applications such as in the Royal Danish Navy's Flyvefisken class patrol vessels, and in fast ferries.

== Applications ==
=== Naval ===
Denmark

- Flyvefisken-class patrol vessel

Japan

- Hayabusa-class patrol boat
- Izumo-class helicopter destroyer (DDH)
- 1-go-class patrol boat

South Korea

- Gumdoksuri-class patrol vessel, including the PKX boats

=== Commercial ===
TurboJET

- FoilCat

=== Industrial ===
Pipeline transport

- Tennessee Gas Pipeline Kinder Morgan
- ExxonMobil Australia
- State Energy Commission of Western Australia. Alinta
- Nova - now TC Energy

=== Research ===
Railgun

- University of Texas - Center for Electromechanics - CEM

== See also ==
Related development

- General Electric CF34
- General Electric TF34

Related lists

- List of aircraft engines
