= Gunboat War =

1807–1814 war of the Napoleonic Wars

- Part of the English Wars and Napoleonic Wars
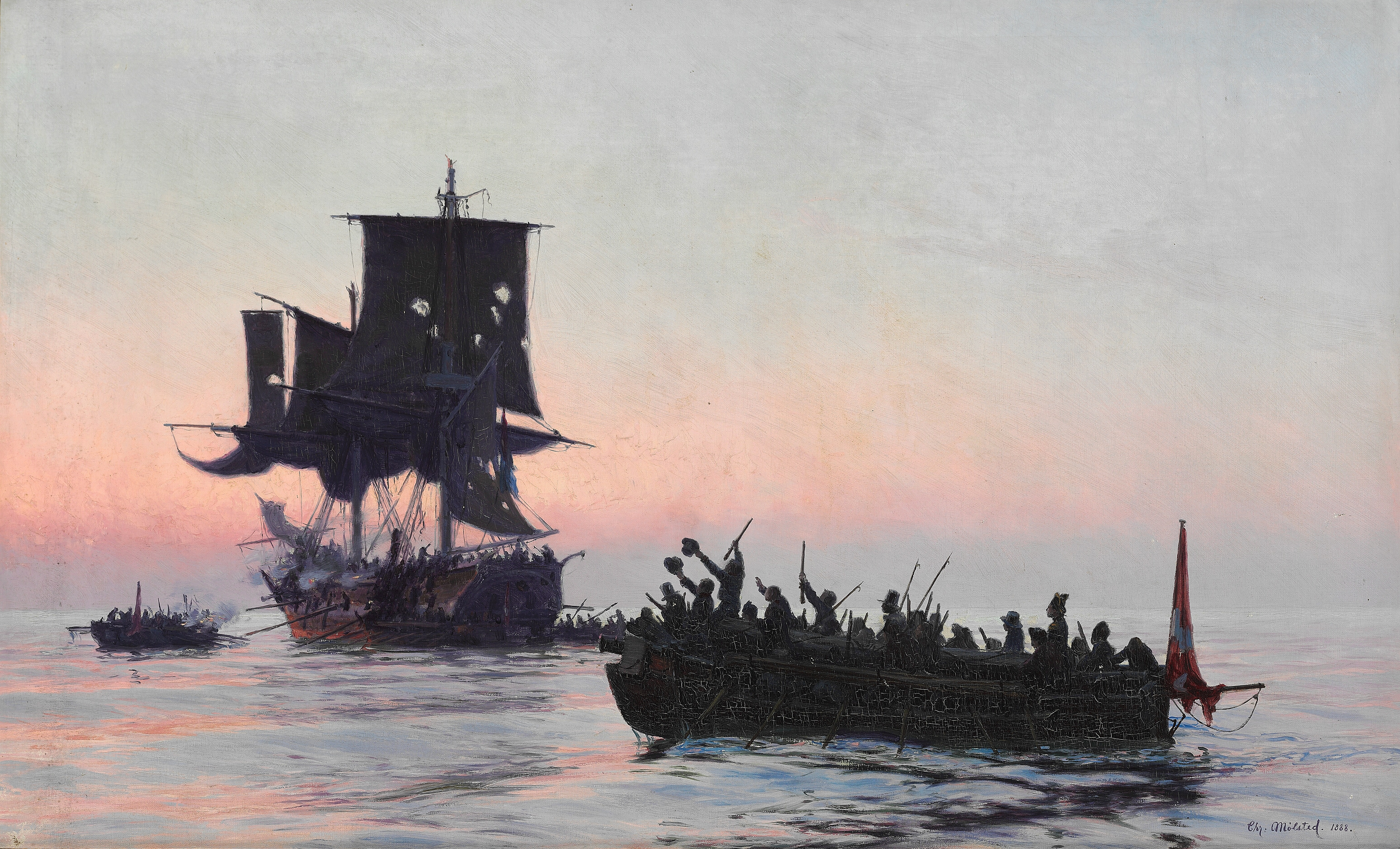
- 1888 painting of Danish gunboats intercepting an unspecified British brig during the war
Date	12 August 1807 – 14 January 1814 (6 years, 5 months and 3 days)
Location	North Sea; Baltic Sea
Result	Anglo-Swedish victory Treaty of Kiel; End of Denmark–Norway
Territorial changes	Heligoland ceded to the United Kingdom; Swedish Pomerania ceded to Denmark; Norway ceded to the King of Sweden; Faroe Islands, Greenland and Iceland ceded to Denmark

Belligerents
Denmark–Norway; Co-belligerent: Russian Empire (1808–09); Supported by: First French Empire	United Kingdom; Sweden (1808–09, 1813–1814)

Commanders and leaders
(Denmark–Norway) Christian VII (Denmark–Norway) Frederick VI (Denmark–Norway) Jørgen Jørgensen (surrendered) (Denmark–Norway) Joachim Castenschiold (Denmark–Norway) Hans Peter Holm (Denmark–Norway) Carl Jessen (surrendered) (Denmark–Norway) Jørgen Falsen (POW) (Denmark–Norway) Ernst Peymann (surrendered) (Denmark–Norway) J. C. A. Bielke (Denmark–Norway) Johan Krieger (Denmark–Norway) Gabriel Heiberg (Denmark–Norway) Ketil Melstedt † (Russian Empire) Alexander I	(United Kingdom of Great Britain and Ireland) George III (United Kingdom of Great Britain and Ireland) Spencer Perceval (United Kingdom of Great Britain and Ireland) Robert Jenkinson (United Kingdom of Great Britain and Ireland) James Maurice (United Kingdom of Great Britain and Ireland) William Cathcart (United Kingdom of Great Britain and Ireland) James Gambier (United Kingdom of Great Britain and Ireland) Arthur Wellesley (United Kingdom of Great Britain and Ireland) George Wood (United Kingdom of Great Britain and Ireland) Richard Byron (United Kingdom of Great Britain and Ireland) George Parker (United Kingdom of Great Britain and Ireland) George Bettesworth † (United Kingdom of Great Britain and Ireland) George Langford (United Kingdom of Great Britain and Ireland) James Stewart (Sweden) Charles XIV John (Sweden) Charles XIII

Strength
Unknown	Unknown

Casualties and losses
Total: 3,502; 503 killed 382 wounded 2,439 captured 2 ships destroyed 75 ships captured 1 ship scuttled	Total: 550; 91 killed 386 wounded 48 missing 2 ships damaged 14 ships captured

The Gunboat War (1807–1814) was a naval conflict between Denmark–Norway and Great Britain supported by Sweden during the Napoleonic Wars. The war's name is derived from the Danish tactic of employing small gunboats against the materially superior Royal Navy. In Scandinavia it is seen as the later stage of the English Wars, whose commencement is accounted as the First Battle of Copenhagen in 1801.

== Background ==
The naval conflict between Britain and Denmark-Norway commenced with the First Battle of Copenhagen in 1801 when Horatio Nelson's squadron of Admiral Hyde Parker's fleet attacked the Danish capital. This came as a basis of Denmark-Norway's policy of armed neutrality during the latter stages of the French Revolutionary Wars, where Denmark used its naval forces to protect trade flowing within, into and out of the Danish-Norwegian waters. Hostilities between Denmark-Norway and the United Kingdom broke out again by the Second Battle of Copenhagen in 1807, when the British attacked the Danish capital to ensure that the Danish-Norwegian fleet did not fall into the hands of Napoleon.

== Danish boat design ==
As a result of the British capture or scuttling of large parts of the Danish-Norwegian fleet during the assault on Copenhagen, the Dano-Norwegian government decided to build gunboats in large numbers to compensate for the loss. The gunboats were originally designed by a Swede, Fredrik Henrik af Chapman, and the strategic advantage of gunboats lay in the fact that they could be produced rapidly and inexpensively throughout the kingdoms. The tactical advantages were that they were highly manoeuvrable, especially in still and shallow waters and presented small targets. On the other hand, the boats were vulnerable and likely to sink from a single hit. They therefore could not be used in rough seas, and they were less effective against large warships. Still, the Danish-Norwegian government produced more than 200 gunboats in two models: the shallop gunboat which had a crew of 76 men, with an 18- or 24-pounder cannon in the bow and another in the stern, and the smaller barge type that had a total crew of 24 men, armed with a single 24-pounder.

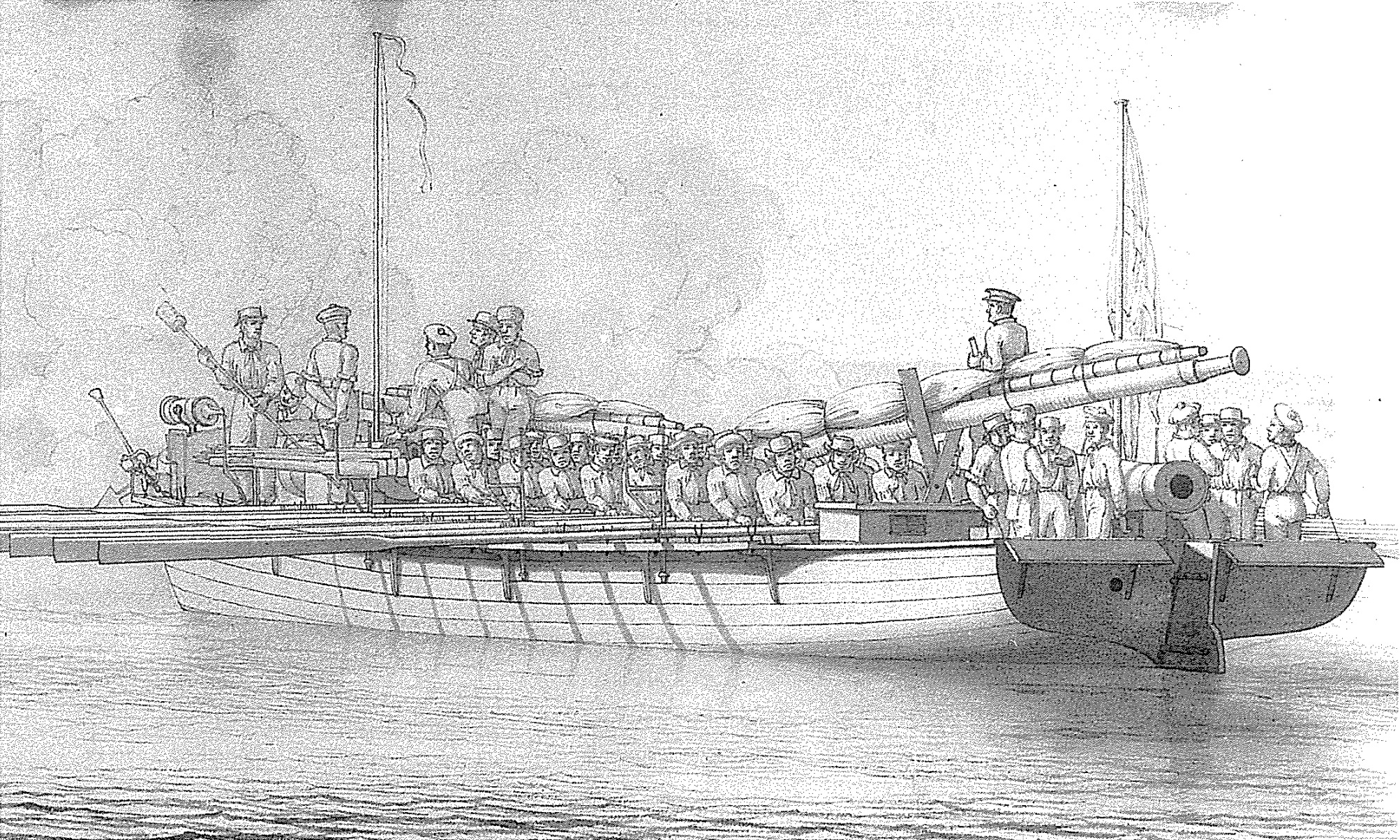
Illustration of a Danish shallop gunboat

The Danish Commodore (later, Admiral) Steen Andersen Bille (1751–1833) is credited with being the driving force behind the post-1807 Dano-Norwegian strategy of gunboat warfare. Below is a description of each of the four classes of gunboats according to Junior Lieutenant Hans Georg Garde, himself a commander of one of the larger types of gunboats.

- Kanonchaluppen: These were the larger type of gunboat. Each was armed with two 24-pounder cannon and four 4-pounder howitzers and had a wartime establishment of 69 – 79 men.
- Kanonjollen: These were the smaller type of gunboat. Each was armed with one 24-pounder cannon and two 4-pounder howitzers, and had wartime establishment of 41 men.
- Morterchaluppen: These were the larger, mortar-armed gunboats. Each was armed with one 100-pounder mortar and two 4-pounder howitzers, and had a wartime establishment of 40 men.
- Morterbarkasserne: These were smaller, mortar-armed gunboats. Each was armed with one mortar and had a wartime establishment of 19 men. They were little more than ordinary ships' boats into which a mortar had been set. They had a tendency to leak badly after 5 – 7 mortar shells had been fired. Their crews then had to bring them back into harbour, remove the mortar, and recaulk their vessels.

Reserve crew who could not be accommodated on board were quartered in buildings on land or in the frigate Triton which was in ordinary. Battle-ready gunboats had their crews on board.

Defences on the Norwegian coast in 1808 by the navy and the Kystmilicien are listed at Royal Dano-Norwegian Navy order of battle in Norway (1808). Ten schooner-rigged gunboats capable of operating in the rougher Norwegian Sea were built in Bergen and Trondheim in the years 1808 to 1811.

== War ==
In the first three years of the Gunboat War, these boats were on several occasions able to seize enemy cargo ships from their convoys and to capture British brigs, though they were not strong enough to overcome larger frigates and ships of the line. The British had control of Danish waters during the whole of the 1807–1814 war, and when the season was suited to navigation they were regularly able to escort large merchant convoys out through the Sound and the Great Belt. Although the discussion below focuses on armed encounters involving an exchange of fire, one must keep in mind that the British also captured numerous Danish privateers without firing a shot, and regularly seized Danish merchant vessels as prizes. The British also conducted amphibious landings on several Danish islands, many populated but lacking garrisons. British warships frequently landed to replenish their stocks of firewood, fresh water and livestock, which were purchased or seized to augment their provisions.

The war overlapped, in time, the Anglo-Russian War. As a result, the British expanded their trade embargo to Russian waters and the British navy conducted forays northwards into the Barents Sea. The British navy conducted successful raids on Hasvik and Hammerfest and disrupted the Pomor trade, the Norwegian trade with Russia.

=== 1807–08 ===
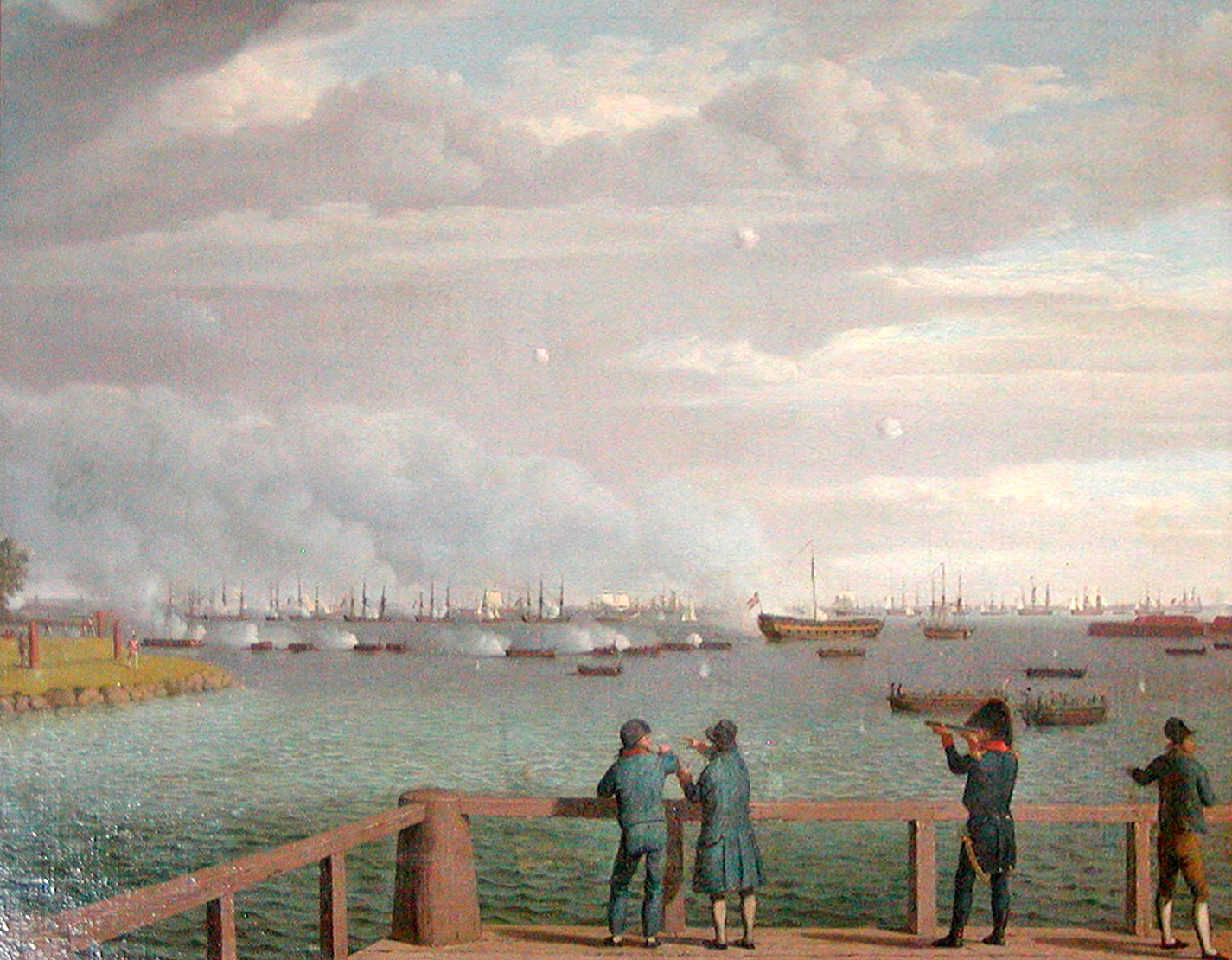
The British bombardment of Copenhagen in September 1807

On 12 August 1807, even before the war had been declared, the British sixth-rate HMS Comus took part in a one-sided single-ship action when she captured the 32-gun Danish frigate (fregat) Friderichsværn. In the engagement the British suffered only one man wounded; the Danes lost 12 men while 20 were wounded, some mortally. Lloyd's List described the Danish vessel as a "Danish Frigate, of 32 Guns, late Guardship", and reported that the action, near Elsinor, had been short. The Royal Navy took Frederiksværn into service as HMS Frederickscoarn.

On 23 August, the British HMS Prometheus fired Congreve rockets from her decks against a Danish gunboat flotilla, but the attack had little effect. The British were instead more successful on 11 September when HMS Carrier brought to the British Admiralty the despatches from Admiral Thomas McNamara Russell announcing the capitulation of the small island of Heligoland to the British. Heligoland later also became a centre for smuggling and for espionage against Napoleon.

In the East Indies, troops from the 14th Regiment of Foot landed from HMS Russell on the Coromandel Coast on 13 February 1808 and took over the Danish possessions at Tranquebar. On 14 March, the 14-gun HMS Childers and the Danish 20-gun sloop HDMS Lougen engaged in an inconclusive single-ship action. Childers lost two men killed and nine wounded before she could escape and return to Leith. On 22 March the British ships of the line HMS Nassau and HMS Stately destroyed the last Danish ship of the line, HDMS Prinds Christian Frederik, commanded by Captain C.W. Jessen, in the Battle of Zealand Point. Nassau was herself a former Danish warship. Nassau had one man killed and 16 men wounded, while Stately had four killed and 27 wounded. The Danes lost 55 men killed and 88 wounded.

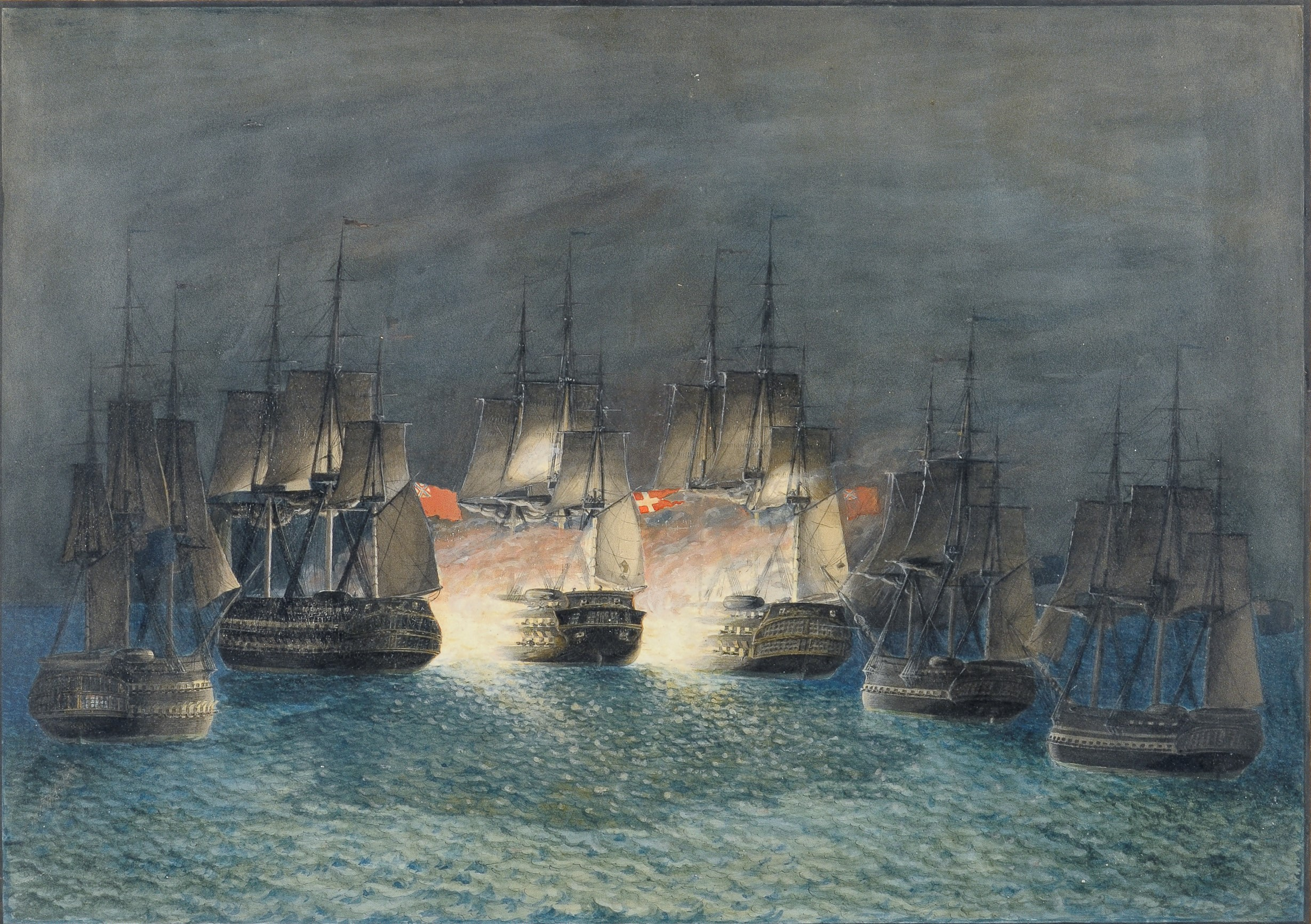
The Battle of Zealand Point on 22 March 1808

Boats from HMS Daphne and HMS Tartarus, supported by the brig HMS Forward, drove ashore a Dano-Norwegian convoy at Flodstrand, near The Skaw on 22 April. The convoy was taking supplies to Norway as a result of supply shortages that had occurred there after the British had begun their naval blockade between Denmark and Norway in 1807. The British went in under heavy fire from the shore and a castle there and brought out five brigs, three galliots, a schooner, and a sloop (totalling some 870 tons burthen), for the loss of five men wounded. The British frigate HMS Tartar also approached Bergen under Dutch colours on 15 May in order to attack the Dutch frigate Guelderland, which had been undergoing repairs there. Unfortunately for the British the Guelderland had already sailed, so during the night the British sent in boats in an attempt to capture Danish shipping in the harbour. When the boats came under heavy fire, Tartar came in to cover them, only to come under attack by the schooner Odin and five gunboats. During the Battle of Alvøen Tartar's captain and another seaman were killed and twelve men were wounded before Tartar was able to make her escape.

The hired armed cutter Swan found herself in action off the island of Bornholm with a Danish 8-gun cutter-rigged vessel on 24 May. Swan had been carrying despatches when she had spotted the Danish vessel and lured her out. The engagement ended with the Danish vessel exploding, while Swan suffered no casualties despite coming under fire both from the Danish vessel and batteries on Bornholm. The fire from the batteries and the sighting of more Danish vessels forced Swan to withdraw after the battle without being able to make efforts to rescue survivors. On 4 June four Danish gunboats attacked HMS Tickler and captured her after a four-hour fight. Tickler had lost her captain and 14 other men killed, and 22 other officers and men killed and wounded out of her crew of 50 men; the Danes had one man wounded. The Danes would later use Tickler as a cadet training ship.

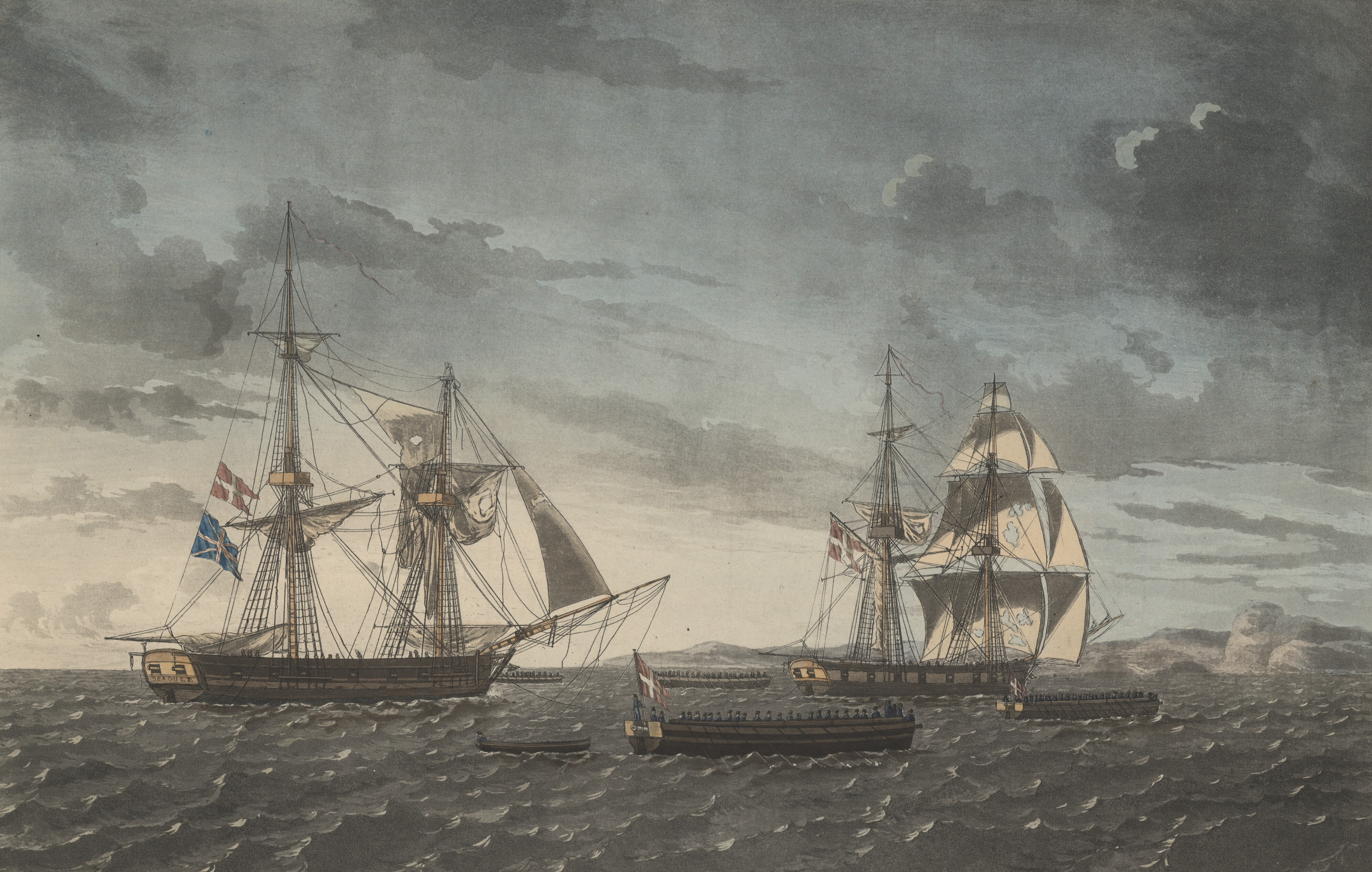
HMS Seagull after she was captured by HDMS Lougen on 19 June 1808

The Danes were also victorious on 19 June, when the brig HMS Seagull pursued and caught up with the Danish brig HDMS Lougen, which was armed with eighteen short 18-pounder guns and two long 6-pounder guns. About 20 minutes into the engagement six Danish gunboats arrived from behind some rocks and in two divisions of three each took up positions on Seagull's quarter and fired on her with their 24-pounder guns while Lougen fired on her larboard bow. Within half an hour the Danish fire had badly damaged Seagull's rigging and dismounted five of her guns. Eventually Seagull struck, having lost eight men killed and 20 wounded, including her captain, R.B. Cathcart. Seagull sank soon after the Danes captured her, drowning several of her captors who were aboard. The Danes later recovered Seagull and added her to their navy. The Danes also captured HMS Tigress. Sixteen Danish gunboats captured her off Langeland in the Great Belt on 2 August. In the engagement Tigress lost two men killed and eight wounded.

Immobilized by a dead calm, HMS Africa, under Captain John Barrett, barely survived an attack by 25 Danish gunboats and seven armed launches under the command of Commodore J.C. Krieger in an action in the Øresund on 20 October 1808. Africa lost nine men killed and 51 wounded; had night not descended the Danes might well have captured her. The British, however, were less fortunate on 5 December, when the bomb vessel HMS Proselyte was wrecked on Anholt Reef while caught in the ice. The reason that the vessel sank in that area was because the Danes had closed the lighthouse on the island of Anholt, in the Kattegat early during the war, and the Admiralty had ordered her to station herself off the island on 9 November to carry a light for the safety of passing convoys. All her crew was however saved.

=== 1809–10 ===
The British 64-gun third rate Standard, under Captain Aiskew Paffard Hollis, and the 18-pounder 36-gun frigate HMS Owen Glendower captured the island of Anholt on 18 May 1809. A party of seamen and marines under the command of Captain William Selby of Owen Glendower, with the assistance of Captain Edward Nicolls of the Standard's marines, landed. The Danish garrison of 170 men put up a sharp, but ineffectual resistance that killed one British marine and wounded two before the garrison then surrendered and the British took immediate possession of the island. The principal objective of the mission was to restore the lighthouse on Anholt to its pre-war state to facilitate the movement of British men of war and merchantmen navigating the dangerous seas there.

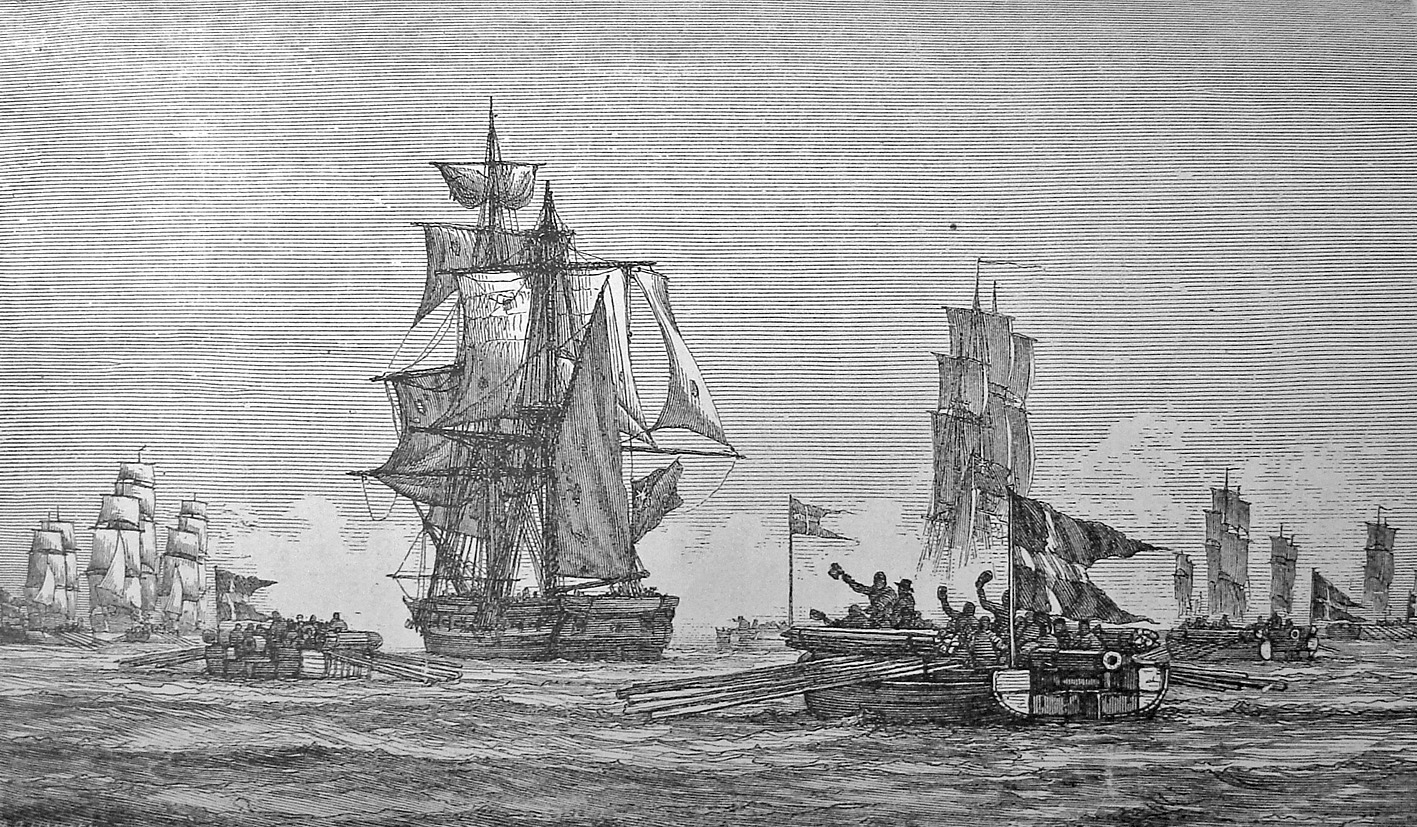
Danish gunboats seizing HMS Turbulent, 9 June 1808.

On 9 June a Danish and Norwegian flotilla of twenty-one gunboats and seven mortar boats attacked a British convoy of 70 merchant ships off the island of Saltholm in Øresund Strait near Copenhagen. The Dano-Norwegian flotilla was able to capture 12 or 13 merchant vessels, plus HMS Turbulent, one of the escorts. The Danes also captured HMS Allart during the Battle of Saltholm on 10 August. During the battle HMS Allart, a former Danish Navy brig, chased Lougen and Seagull into Fredriksvern only to find herself pursued by 15 Danish gunboats, arrayed in three divisions. After a three-hour chase the gunboats closed with Allart and an engagement began. After two hours Allart struck, having had her rigging shot away and having lost one man killed and three wounded.

On 12 August, Commander John Willoughby Marshall and HMS Lynx were in the company of the gun-brig HMS Monkey, Lieutenant Thomas Fitzgerald, when they discovered three Danish luggers off the Danish coast. The water was too shallow for Lynx, so Marshall sent Monkey and boats from Lynx in to cut them out. The largest of the luggers, which had four guns and four howitzers, opened fire on Monkey before all three luggers ran ashore once Monkey and the launch's 18-pounder carronade returned fire. The British refloated the luggers and brought them out the next day, having taken no casualties. In their haste to escape the vessel, the Danes failed to fire the fuse on a cask of gunpowder they had left by the fireplace on the largest lugger. Marshall thought the Danes' behaviour in leaving the explosive device disgraceful.

The Danish-Norwegian navy managed to capture another British vessel on 2 September, when a Danish gunboat flotilla from Fladstrand, North Jutland, under the command of Lieutenant Nicolai H. Tuxen, captured the gun-brig HMS Minx. The engagement cost Minx two dead and nine wounded. The British Royal Navy had stationed her off the Skaw Reef to show a warning light. HMS Sheldrake reported the loss to the Admiralty.

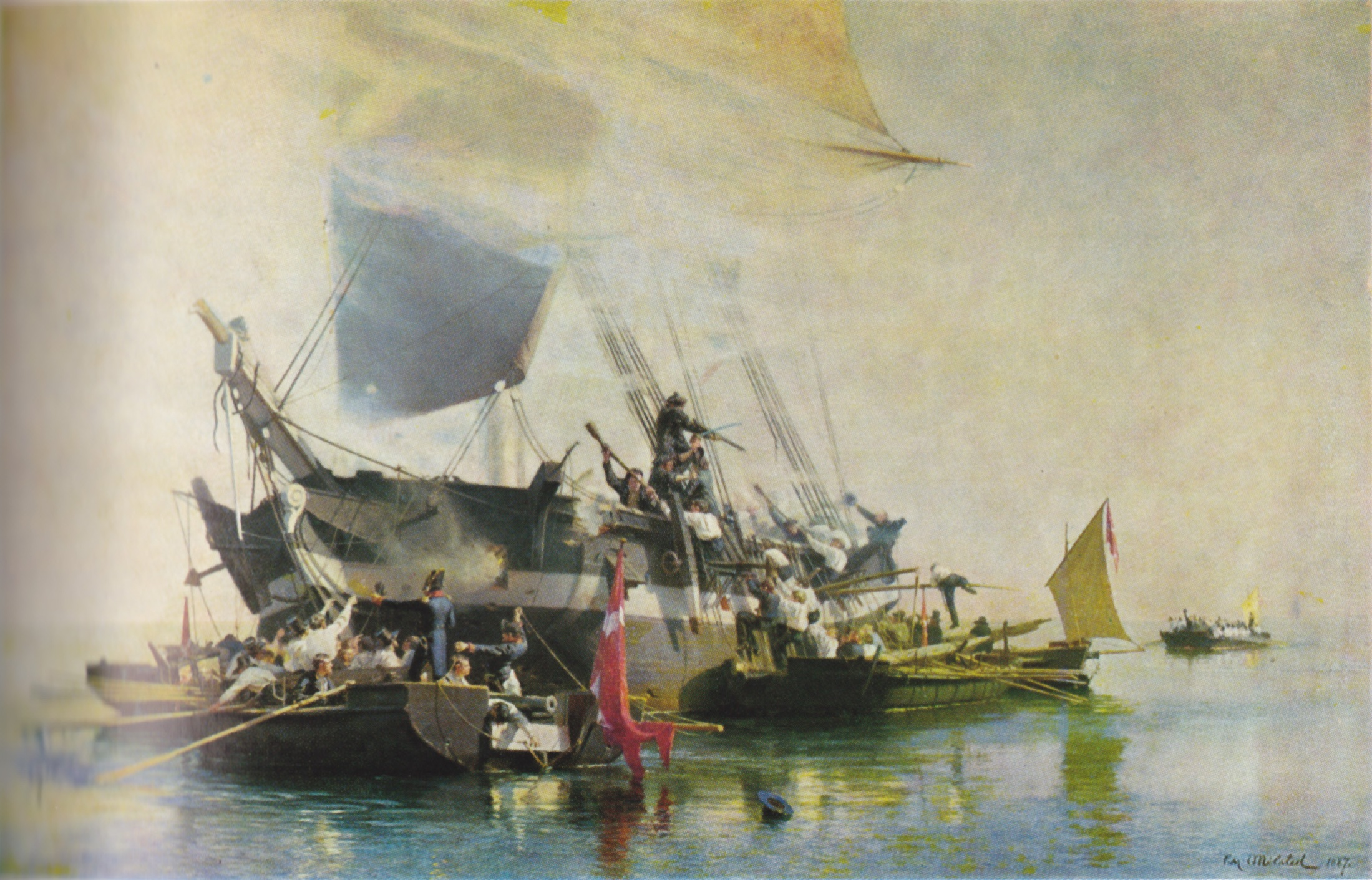
English Brig Attacked by Danish-Norwegian gunboat by Christian Mølsted

Early in 1810, the Danes ceased sending provisioning ships to Norway because of British naval activity in Øresund and withdrew the naval officers that were so involved to Zealand. Meanwhile, there were difficulties in transporting grain from Vordingborg, in the south of Denmark, past Møn to Copenhagen. This was overcome by using gunboats to convoy the merchant vessels, as the gunboats were much more maneuverable in the shallow coastal waters, and restricting the cargo vessels to those which could pass inside of Møn. Larger seagoing ships which would have to go outside, i.e. east of Møn, were too liable to be caught by the British. These actions, together with a good form of coastal signalling, resulted in a steady supply of grain to the Danish capital.

On 13 April 1810, four Danish gunboats, under the command of First Lieutenant Peter Nicolay Skibsted, captured the British gunboat Grinder off the Djursland peninsula near Grenå. Grinder was armed with one 24-pounder gun and one 24-pounder carronade. She was under the command of Master's Mate Thomas Hester and had over-wintered at Anholt. Of her crew of 34 men, two were killed and two wounded in the action.

On 23 May, seven Danish gunboats engaged the Cruizer-class brig-sloop Raleigh, Alban, and His Majesty's hired armed cutter Princess of Wales, off the Skaw. The engagement cost the Danes the loss of one gunboat, which blew up, and heavy damage to the rest.

The Battle of Silda was fought on 23 July near the Norwegian island of Silda. The British frigates HMS Belvidera and HMS Nemesis attacked the pilot's station on the island and defeated the three gun schooners Odin, Tor and Balder and the gun barge Cort Adeler, which were stationed there.

On 12 September, six Danish gunboats captured a becalmed Alban after a four-hour battle during which she lost her captain and one man killed and three men wounded. The Danes then took her into service as The Alban.

=== 1811–14 ===
Danish gunboats manned by nearly 1,000 men, including infantry forces attempted to recapture Anholt on 27 February 1811. The Battle of Anholt resulted in a Danish withdrawal to Jutland, with heavy losses. The Danes did however emerge victorious on 23 April when Swan encountered three Danish gunboats in Sunningesund. A shot from one of the gunboats damaged Swan and resulted in the wetting of her powder magazine, forcing her surrender. The Danes boarded her but were able to retrieve little before Swan sank off Uddevalla, on the Swedish coast north of Gothenburg. The fight cost Swan two men killed, as the same battle apparently also resulted in the damaging of the hired armed cutter Hero. (Note: Gosset has Hero being sunk, but does not report any court date. Other reports have Hero damaged, but continuing to serve until November 1811.) On 11 May, Rifleman recaptured Alban from the Danes. The capture occurred after a 12-hour chase near Shetland. At the time of her capture Alban was armed with 12 guns and had a crew of 58 men, all under the command of a lieutenant of the Danish navy. She was three days out of Farsund in Norway and had taken no prizes.

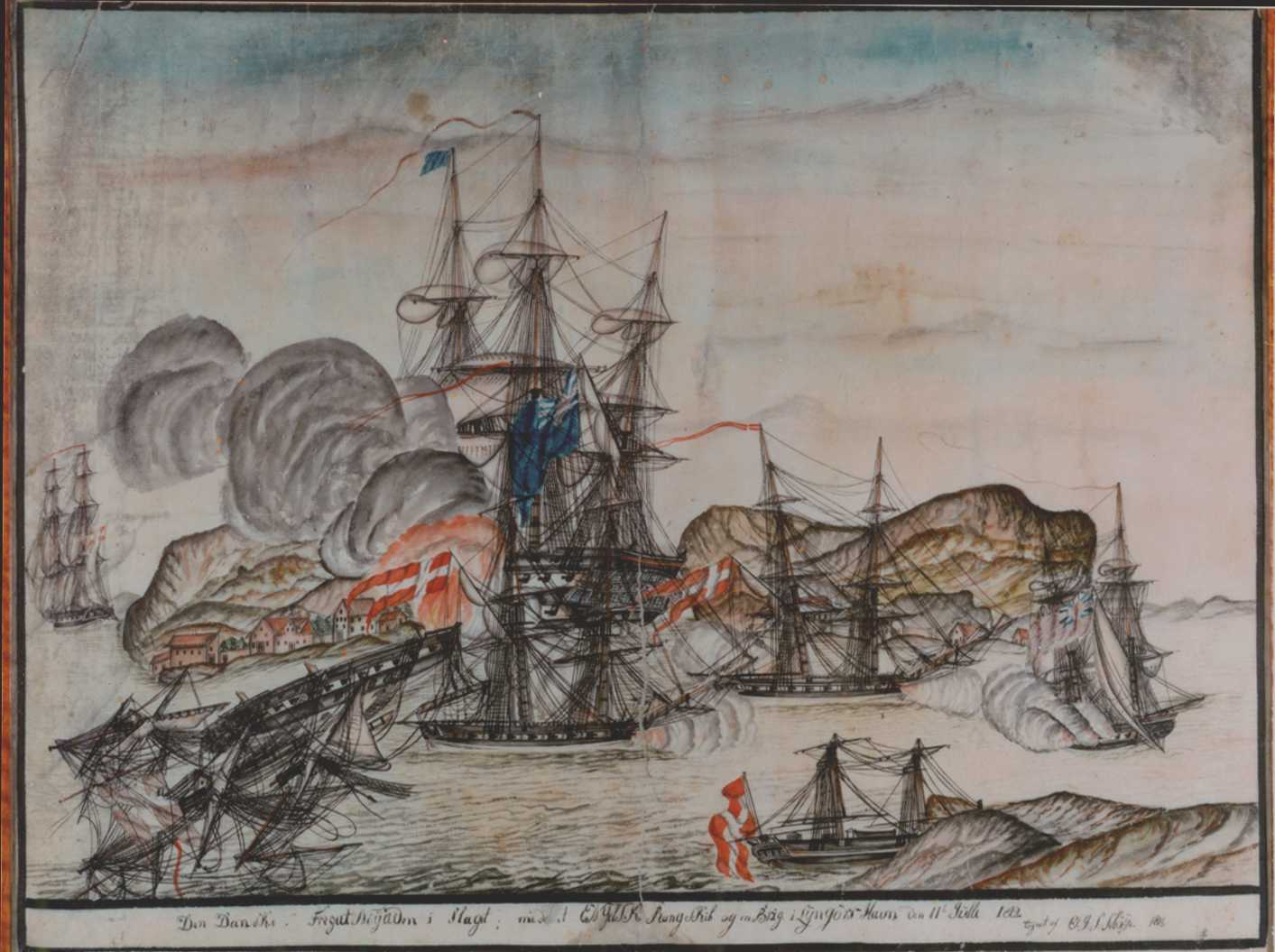
The Battle of Lyngør

On 31 July 1811, HMS Brev Drageren and Algerine were cruising together in Long Sound, Norway, when they encountered and engaged three Danish brigs: the 20-gun Langeland, the 18-gun Lügum, and the 16-gun Kiel. Outnumbered and outgunned, the British vessels withdrew. The next day Brev Drageren unsuccessfully re-engaged first one and then two of the brigs. In the inconclusive engagement each British vessel sustained one man killed, and Brev Drageren also had three wounded. On 17 August HMS Manly sailed from Sheerness with a convoy for the Baltic. On 2 September, while she was cruising off Arendal on the Norwegian coast in the company of Chanticleer, three Danish 18-gun-brigs (Alsen, Lolland, and Samsø) engaged them. Lolland engaged Manly while the other two chased Chanticleer but she maintained a course away from the action and made good her escape. In the engagement with Lolland, Manly had her spars and rigging cut to pieces. With only six guns left, and having lost one man killed and three wounded, Manly was forced to strike.

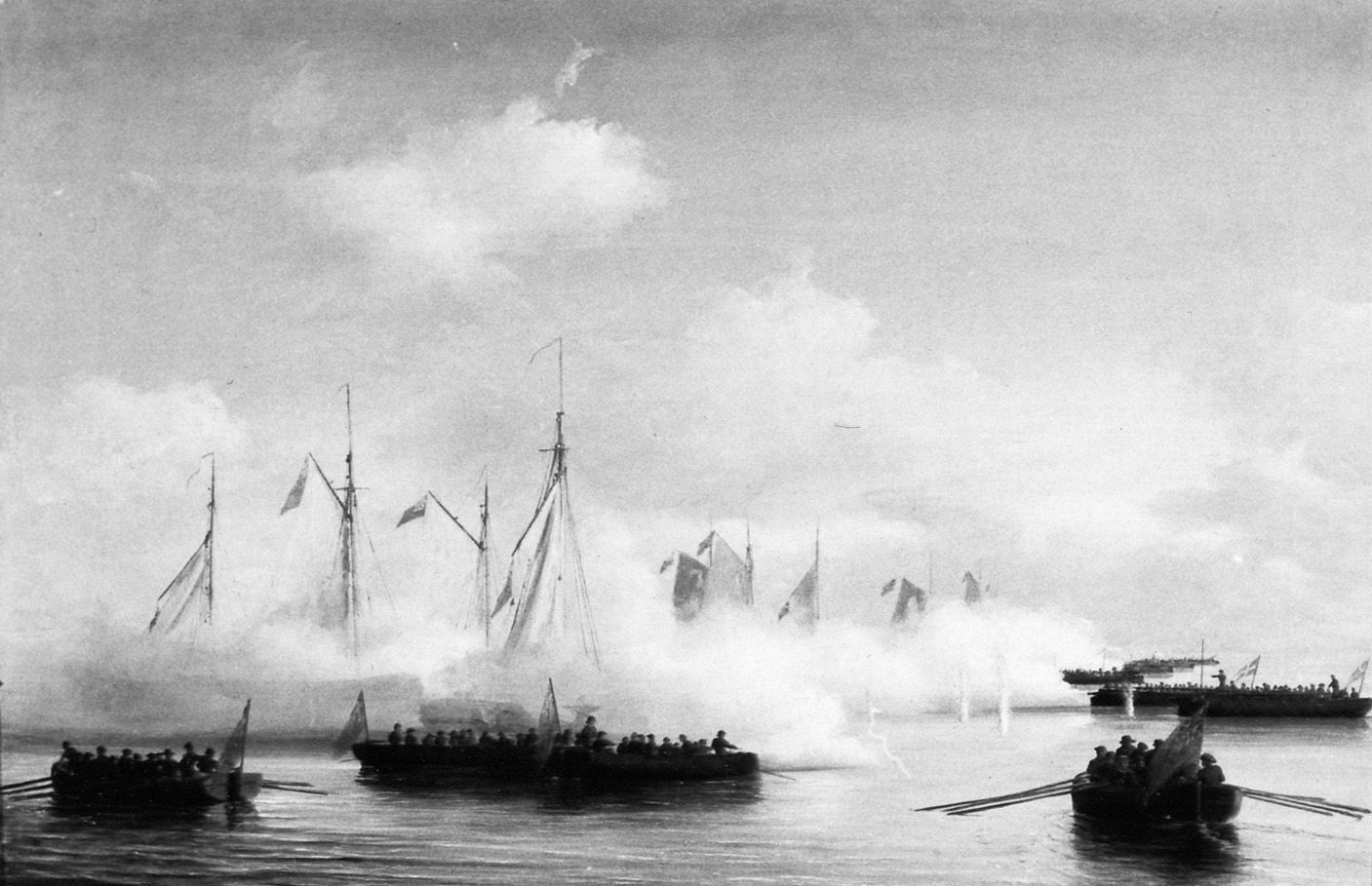
10 British gunboats and four barges being repelled by seven Danish gunboats off Büsum on 3 September 1813

The last major fight between Danish-Norwegian and British warships took place on 6 July 1812 during the Battle of Lyngør, when a small squadron of British warships met a small squadron of Norwegian warships at Lyngør on the Norwegian coast. The British withdrew after destroying the Norwegian frigate Najaden. On 2 August the same year, boats of HMS Horatio, which was under the command of Captain Lord George Stuart, captured two Danish vessels, under the command of Lieutenant Hans Buderhof, and their prize, an American vessel of about 400 tons burthen (bm). The two Danish vessels were schooner No. 114 (of six 6-pounders and 30 men), and cutter No. 97 (of four 6-pounders and 22 men). In the action the British lost nine men killed and 16 wounded, of whom two died of their wounds; the Danes lost ten men killed and 13 wounded.

== Peace ==
As a result of the Swedish invasion of Holstein in December 1813 during the War of the Sixth Coalition, Denmark-Norway was forced to seek peace, and the Treaty of Kiel ended the war on 14 January 1814. Denmark-Norway had to cede Heligoland to Britain and the Kingdom of Norway (except for Greenland, Iceland and the Faroe Islands) to the King of Sweden, while Denmark did get back the island of Anholt and was compensated for the loss of Norway with the Duchy of Saxe-Lauenburg. However, this treaty was not accepted by the Norwegian people, who refused to be simply a bargaining chip, and a war between Norway and Sweden broke out on 26 July.

== See also ==
- Denmark in the Napoleonic Era
- Norway in the Napoleonic Era
- Kingdom of Norway (1814)
- Norwegian War of Independence
- Battle of Copenhagen (1801)
- Battle of Copenhagen (1807)

== Citations ==
- Individual record cards in Danish for ships of the Danish Royal Navy can be no longer (Feb 2013) found on the internet at Orlogmuseet Skibregister. The Danish Naval Museum is building a new website at which details, drawings and models may be available. For individual ships already listed, including Næstved, see here.
