= Order of battle of the Royal Dano-Norwegian Navy in Norway (1808) =

The following is a list of the Royal Dano-Norwegian naval order of battle in Norway in 1808 (Note: As translated/copied from the reference Larsen N.A."and summarised by Viking1808 November 2016 to January 2017.) after the capture of the British brig Seagull on 19 June 1808.

Following the loss of the Danish-Norwegian fleet at the Battle of Copenhagen in 1807 and of the last ship-of-the line, Prinds Christian Frederick, at Zealand Point in March 1808, Denmark-Norway were forced to adopt the method of defence later known as the Gunboat War. Lacking the time and resources to build a new battle fleet, they concentrated on smaller craft capable of carrying heavy, long range cannon viz. gunboats that were effective in the calmer, narrower inshore waters, but could not challenge enemy warships in rougher seas. For the rougher waters of the Norwegian Sea from 1808 onward, a new class of gunship, the seaworthy 50-man pine-built Norske Kanonskonnert were to be built in Bergen and Trondheim. Ten such gunships were constructed before 1814, and more after Norway achieved independence from Denmark.

== Command structure ==
Adjutant General of the navy: Commander Lorenz Fisker

The station at Hvaløerne and Grændsen (Hvaler Islands and the border with Sweden at the mouth of the Oslofjord):

- First Division Kanonchalupper (Larger Gunboats) commanded by Kapteinløitnant S. Bille.
- Second Division Kanonchalupper commanded by Senior Lieutenant (Note: In translating ranks Premierløitnant = Senior Lieutenant; Sekondløitnant = Junior Lieutenant; Maanedsløitnant = Acting Lieutenant; Kadet-Maanedsløitnant = Midshipman-Acting Lieutenant) J. N. Müller.
- First Division Kanonjoller (Smaller gunboats) commanded by Senior Lieutenant G Hagerup
- Second Division Kanonjoller commanded by Junior Lieutenant J J Lund

The station at Frederiksværn (Western side of the Oslofjord, near Stavern):

- Commander: Senior Lieutenant Hensler.

The station at Langesund (Western side of the Oslofjord, opposite Hvaler):

- Commander: Senior Lieutenant H. D. B. Seidelin.

The station at Øster-Risøer (Western side of the Oslofjord, south of Langesund):

- Commander: Junior Lieutenant F. W. Løvenskiold.

The station at Arendal (Western side of the Oslofjord, south of Øster-Risøer):

- Commander: Senior Lieutenant G. G. Dietrichson.

The station at Christianssand (Kristiansand, near southern tip of Norway):

- Commander: Captain M. Bille.

The station at Mandal (At the southern tip of Norway):

- Commander: Senior Lieutenant P. C. Spørck.

The station at Stavanger:

- Commander: Junior Lieutenant J. C. Grove.

The station in Bergen:

- Commander: Senior Lieutenant Kammerjunker J. C. A. Bjelke.

The station in Trondhjem:

- Commander: Captain F. C. Motzfeldt.

== Vessels ==
- Lougen: brig armed with 18 × short 18-pounder and 2 × long 6-pounder cannon
  - Officers: Kapteinløitnant P. F. Wulff, Sekondløitnant Wiegelsen, Sekondløitnant Schmidten, and MaanedsløitnantLund.
- Seagull: brig armed with 16 × short 18-pounder and 2 × long 6-pounder cannon
  - Officers: Premierløitnant O. C. Budde, Sekondløitnant Havn, Maanedsløitnant Troy, and Maanedsløitnant Obelitz.
- Hemnæs: schooner brig armed with 12 × 24-pounder carronades and 2 × long 6-pounder cannon
  - Officers: Maanedsløitnant Wahrendorff, Maanedsløitnant R. Knap.
- Fortroendet: defence ship armed with 16 × short 18-pounder cannons and 2 × 24-pounder carronades
  - Officers: Premierløitnant Dorn, Kadet-Maanedsløitnant Findt, and Maanedsløitnant Harris.
- Friherrinde Fredrikke Lovise: defence ship armed similarly to Fortroendet above
  - Officers: Premierløitnant Conrad Grove, Kadet-Maanedsløitnant Hesselberg, and Maanedsløitnant Leth.
- Birgitha: defence ship armed with 14 × short 18-pounder and 2 × long 6-pounder cannons
  - Officers: Premierløitnant C. Rasch, Kadet-Maanedsløitnant Ryberg, and Maanedsløitnant Parnemann.
- Prinds Christian til Slesvig-Holsten: defence ship armed with 16 × short 18-pounder and 2 × long 6-pounder cannons
  - Officers: Premierløitnant Jochum Lund, Kadet-Maanedsløitnant N. Grove, and Maanedsløitnant Vauvert.

== Gunboats ==
Larger Gun Boats (named in list, by station) - Kanonchalupper usually armed with 2 × 24-pounder cannon and 4 × 4-pounder howitzers

- Arendal 2;
- Fredriksværn 5 (plus one under construction);
- Langesund 1;
- Christianssand 6 (plus two under construction);
- Hvaløerne 11;
- Mandal 1;
- Bergen 2;
- Trondhjem (4 under construction)

Smaller Gun Boats (named in list, by station) - Kanonjolle each with one 24 pound cannon

- Arendal 2;
- Frederiksværn 6 (two with two 4-pounder howitzers in addition);
- Langesund 4;
- Stavanger 2 (plus one very small gunboat armed with one 8-pounder cannon);
- Øster-Risøer 4;
- Christianssand 7;
- Hvaløerne 13;
- Mandal 2;
- Bergen 5 (plus three under construction);
- Trondhjem (4 under construction)

== Batteries ==
Fixed Coastal Batteries:

- Slesvigs Batteri on the eastern side of the entrance to Christiana (Oslo) fjord.
  14 × 18-pounder cannon.
  Lieutenant in the land forces v. Lemvig, in command.
- Vallø Saltverks defence works near Tønsberg on the western side of Oslo fjord
  10 × 24-pounder cannon, 3 × 18-pounder cannon, 4 × 6-pounder cannon, 2 × 4-pounder cannon
  Acting Lieutenant V. Lerche, in command.
- Svelvigens Batterier
  (probably near Svelvik, closer to Oslo)
  22 × 12-pounder cannon, 12 × 3- or 4-pounder cannon
  Kapteinløitnant van Deurs, in command.
- Sandvigens Batteri near Arendal
  12 × 12-pounder cannon
  Head of the Coastguard Division Lind, in command.
- Flekkerø Batteri on the approaches to Kristiansand
  4 × 24-pounder cannon. (Occupied and defended in the event of enemy action with manpower from the gunboat flotilla.)
- Also, much closer in to Kristiansand, Christiansholm Fortress which saw action in 1807 shortly after the Battle of Copenhagen, repelling a putative attack on HDMS Prinds Christian Frederik by HMS Spencer

Floating batteries

- Frederiksværn: one armed 10 × 24-pounder cannon, 2 × 18-pounder cannon, 2 × 12-pounder howitzers, 1 × 4-pounder howitzer
- Christianssand: Three armed variously: 8 × 24-pounder cannon; 6 × 24-pounder cannon; 6 × 18-pounder cannon).
