= HMS Nimble (1811) =

Cutter of the Royal Navy

History

United Kingdom
- Name: HMS Nimble
- Ordered: 21 January 1811
- Builder: Thomas Gely, Cowes
- Laid down: June 1811
- Launched: 17 December 1811
- Fate: Wrecked 6 October 1812

General characteristics
- Class & type: Nimble-class cutter
- Tons burthen: 1446/94 (bm)
- Length: Overall:63 ft 3 1/2 in (19.3 m); Keel:49 ft 2 5/8 in (15.0 m)
- Beam: 23 ft 5 1/2 in (7.2 m)
- Depth of hold: 10 ft 4 in (3.1 m)
- Complement: 50
- Armament: 10 × 12-pounder carronades

HMS Nimble was the name vessel of a two-vessel class of cutters built at Cowes in 1811 for the Royal Navy. Lieutenant John Reynolds commissioned her in 1812.

On 6 March 1812 she captured Danish sloop No.5.

On 25 May the Danish brig Anna Maria came into Hull. She and her cargo of hemp were a prize to Nimble. Nimble captured her on 12 April.

On 11 July she captured the Danish vessel Enigheden.

On 18 July Henry Weir of HMS Calypso reported that he had encountered the cutter Nimble, which had gone into Norwegian waters to reconnoiter after the Battle of Lyngør. Nimble had reported seeing four brigs at Christiansand: Allart, Seagull, Langeland, and Alsen.

Loss: Nimble was wrecked on a sunken rock a half-dozen miles from the Sälö Beacon, Sweden, during a violent storm in the Kattegat on 6 October 1812. At first light Swedish fishing boats came and rescued all the crew. Apparently, insufficient allowance had been made for the strong currents. The court martial reprimanded Lieutenant Reynolds for not having come on deck at 1:30 when warned of the nearness of land. The pilot also had failed to heed the warning and come on deck; he was reprimanded and ordered to forfeit three months pay.
