= HDMS Allart =

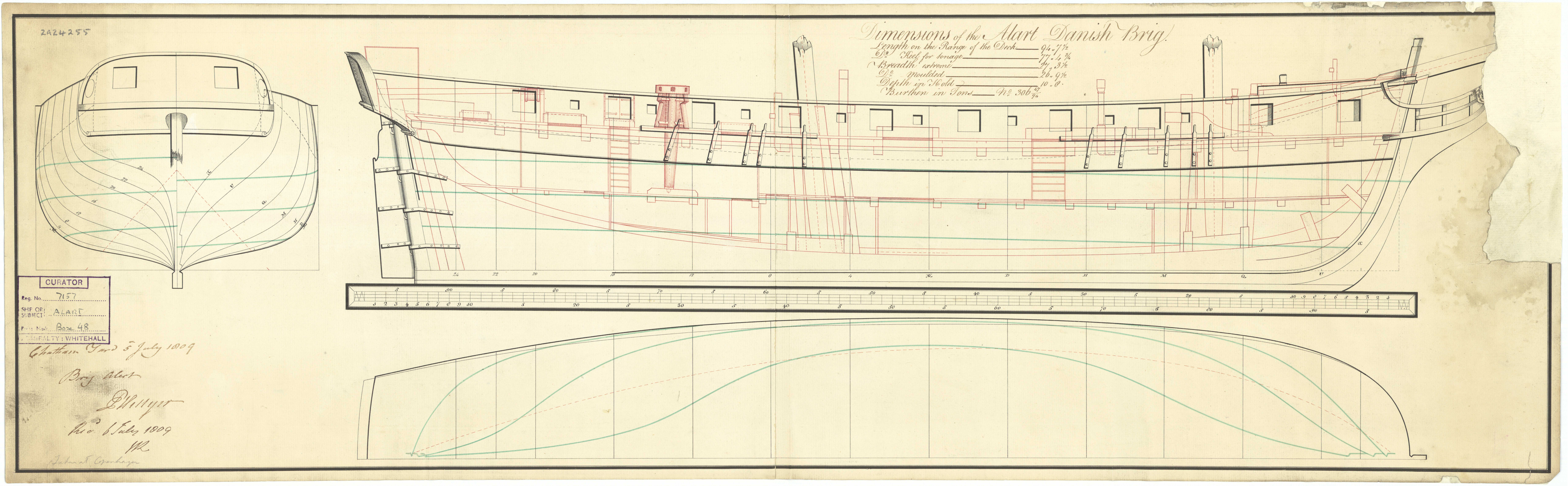
- Allart (captured 1807) (alternative spelling- Alart)

History

Denmark-Norway
- Name: HDMS Allart
- Builder: Stibolt, Bodenhoffs Plads, Copenhagen
- Launched: 6 June 1807
- Captured: Taken by British at Battle of Copenhagen (1807)

United Kingdom
- Name: HMS Allart
- Acquired: September 1807 by capture
- Captured: 10 August 1809

Denmark-Norway
- Name: HDMS Allart
- Acquired: 10 August 1809 by capture
- Fate: Transferred to Norway 1814

Norway
- Name: HNoMS Allart
- Acquired: 1814 (by transfer)
- Fate: Sold into merchant service 1825

General characteristics
- Type: Brig
- Displacement: 169 1/2 tons
- Tons burthen: 30647/94 (bm)
- Length: Danish:93'6"; British: Overall:94 ft 7 1/2 in (28.8 m); Keel:77 ft 4 3/4 in (23.6 m)
- Beam: Danish:26'; British:27 ft 3 1/2 in (8.3 m)
- Draught: 10' 3"(forward) & 11' 3" (aft) - Danish
- Depth of hold: 10 ft 8 in (3.3 m) (British)
- Sail plan: Brig
- Complement: Danish:85; British: 100
- Armament: Initially (all of iron): 2 × 6-pounder guns; 16 × 24-pounder; 1 × 12-pounder carronades; British: 16 × 24-pounder carronades; 2 × 6-pounder guns; Later: 18 × short 18-pounder guns; 2 × 6-pounder guns

HDMS Allart, a brig launched at Copenhagen in June 1807, was amongst the ships taken by the British after the second Battle of Copenhagen. In British service, she was recaptured by Danish-Norwegian gunboats after venturing too close inshore. Her subsequent service was in the Dano-Norwegian Navy's Norwegian Brig Division, which harried enemy frigates and convoys in Norwegian waters. In 1812, she was captained by Ulrich Anton Schønheyder. His father was after the mother's death married to Joachime Catharine Benzon (1757-1836). On the separation of Denmark from Norway in 1814, Allart transferred to the Norwegian navy, who sold her in 1825.

== Origin and capture ==
Allart was one of a second series of four brigs that the Dano-Norwegian navy built to a design by Ernst Wilhelm Stibolt, and highly similar to that of the four brigs of the Lougen class. The British seized three of each class after the surrender of the Dano-Norwegian fleet. (Note: The initial list of vessels captured at Copenhagen omits Allart and her class-mate, Delphinen.) The British took Allart into service as Allart, (or Alaart). (Note: There was an Admiralty plan in 1809 to give the captured Danish vessels more English names - Allart was to have received the name Cassandra - but the plan was rescinded. Allart's recapture would have made the plan moot in her case.)

== British service ==
Allart arrived at Chatham on 15 December 1807. She then spent the next six months until 16 May 1808 being fitted. Commander James Tillard commissioned her in February. On 27 July 1808 Alaart recaptured the sloop Goede Hoepe.

In 1808 Alaart was with Admiral Saumarez's fleet, which was blockading Rager Vik (Ragerswik or Rogerswick or Russian: Baltiyskiy) where the Russian fleet was sheltering after the British 74-gun third rates Implacable and Centaur had destroyed the Russian 74-gun Vsevolod. Saumarez wanted to attack the fleet and ordered Baltic and Erebus to be prepared as fireships. However, reconnaissance by Salsette, among other vessels, revealed that the Russians had stretched a chain across the entrance to the harbor, impeding an attack by fireships. Still, on 13 September the British made a half-hearted attempt, with Erebus leading, and Salsette, Magnet, Allart, and the hired armed cutter Swan providing cover. The attack failed, with the loss of one vessel, a Russian brig that the British had taken earlier. Saumarez then abandoned the plan.

On 9 April 1809 Alaart captured the Danish galiot Flyndern while Minx was in sight. Nine days later Minx captured the Danish galiot Anna Johanna Christina while Alaart was in sight.

At some point Alaart sent in her boats at Bornholm where they succeeded in destroying a large vessel under the guns of a Danish battery.

On 30 April Alaart was among the vessels in company or in sight when Tartar captured the Charlotte. In July 1809 Louis A Robinson, Master’s Mate of Alaart, was in a prize that she had taken when two armed Danish boats attacked simultaneously. Robinson succeeded in capturing one and repelling the other. Then on 9 August he was in charge of another prize when a Danish privateer lugger made three unsuccessful attempts to board his vessel.

== Recapture ==
On 10 August 1809, Allart, still under Commander James Tillard, chased the Dano-Norwegian warships Lougen and Seagull into Fredriksvern, only to find herself the quarry of 15 Danish gunboats, arrayed in three divisions. After a three-hour chase the gunboats closed with Allart and an engagement began. After an engagement that lasted two hours, Alaart struck, having had her rigging shot away and having lost one man killed and three wounded. The officer in command of the gunboat flotilla was Captain Søren Adolph Bille. (Note: The 36-year-old Søren Bille was a half-brother to rear admiral Michael Bille and a distant relation of admiral Steen Andersen Bille – see Family Tree)

== Dano-Norwegian service ==
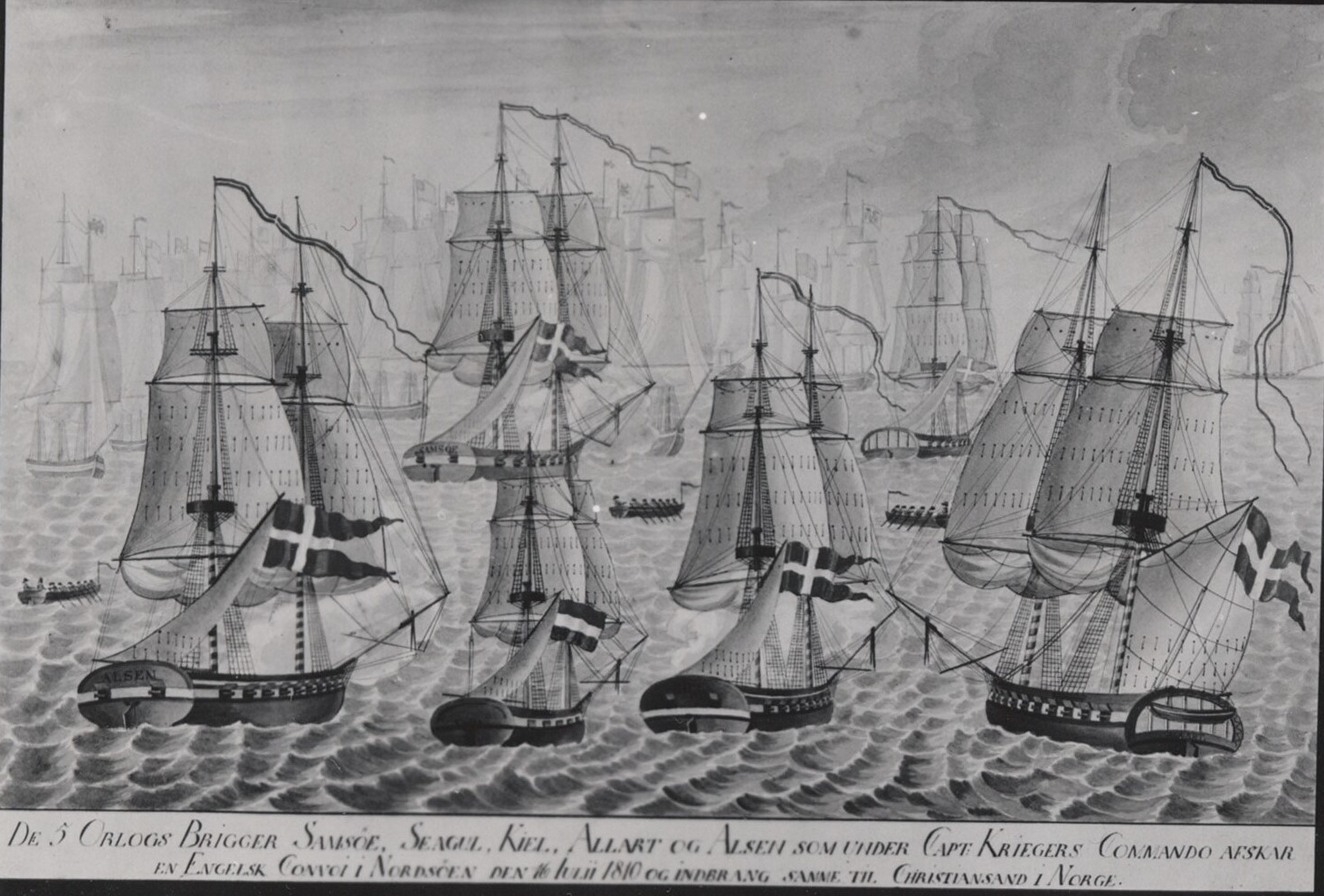
The Danish brigs Samsøe, Seagull, Kiel, Allart and Alsen attacking a British merchant convoy in the North Sea on 16 July 1810

On 1 May 1810, off southernmost Norway, the 36-gun fifth-rate frigate, HMS Tribune attempted an attack on Samsøe and Alsen, which retreated towards land and the protection of the Mandal division of gunboats and the other brigs Allart and Seagull. Once reunited as a brig squadron, the four Danish-Norwegian brigs sought to bring Tribune to action in a lively sea but the frigate maintained sufficient searoom. Action was eventually broken off with some damage to Tribune's sails and her boats.

On 12 May there was another inconclusive meeting, in the North Sea, of the four brigs with a British frigate, which retired with discretion after some sail and rigging damage in an 80-minute exchange of cannon fire. Allart was commanded by Premierløitnant G. Hagerup on this occasion.

On 18 July 1812, Henry Weir of HMS Calypso reported that he had encountered the cutter HMS Nimble, which had gone into Norwegian waters to reconnoiter after the Battle of Lyngør. Nimble had reported that seeing four brigs at Christiansand: Allart, Seagull, Langeland, and Alsen.

== Fate ==
Allart was in Norwegian waters in January 1814 when the Treaty of Kiel settled separation of Norway from Denmark, but it was not until 1816 that negotiations agreed that Allart was not Danish. (Note: See HDMS Lolland.) She was written off the Danish books on 12 November 1816. The Norwegian navy sold her in 1825 into merchant service.

== See also ==
- List of ships captured at Battle of Copenhagen
