= Coastal Militia (Denmark-Norway) =

- Kystmilitsen
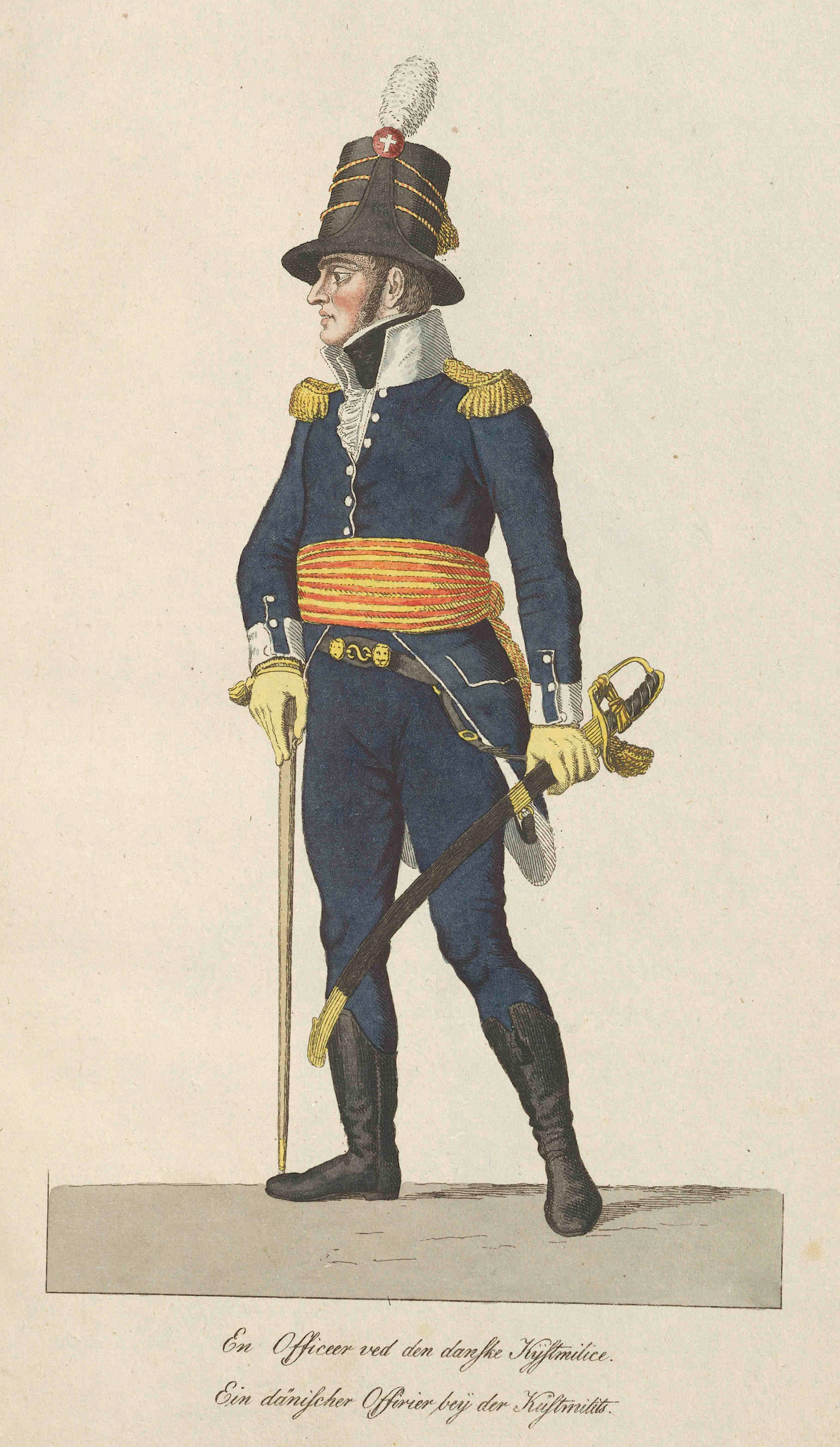
- Kystmilitsen Officer
- Active: 1801 - 1814
- Country: (Denmark–Norway) Denmark-Norway
- Branch: Coastal Defense
- Size: unknown
- Stationed: Around the coasts of Denmark and Norway
- Equipment: M1801 Kystmilitspike
- Engagements: Gunboat War

The Coastal Militia (Danish: Kystmilitsen; contemporary spelling: Kystmilicen) was a militia unit of Denmark–Norway during the Napoleonic Wars. Their primary role was to guard the coastline, protect local shipping, and defend against British naval raids and amphibious landings as the first line of defence.

== History ==
On June 19, 1801, following the Battle of Copenhagen the Landeværnet was established. On July 3, crown prince Frederik decreed, as regent for the schizophrenic king Christian VII, that the local Amtmænd should urge men in the ages 31–50, who were not already enrolled in the Landeværnet or a part of the regular army, to arm themselves. By November, a force of 16.920 volunteers had been established on the initiative of the General in northern Jutland. On the 27th, this was sanctioned by the Crown Prince.

In every coastal parish, a local commander was chosen after the wishes of the men, while the Amtmand remained the head of the militia in the entire Amt. They would be drilled for 2 hours every Sunday. The militia were also provided with cannons and munitions. Coastal batteries were erected around the coasts of Denmark, which the Coastal Militia was supposed to man in cooperation with the regular army. Yet despite their importance, many coastal defences were run-down or undermanned. Later ordinances would also establish a communication line between farmers up to 3 km inwards as to get the attention of the local kystmilits, as they would be more likely to respond faster than regular army units. Additionally, the minimum age requirement was lowered to 20. During wartime, an amt's kystmilits was to keep a third of their force on beach watch and to provide the rest the units of the neighbouring amts'.

In the period until 1808, kysmilits units were raised in other areas of Denmark and Norway. In 1807, the British landed on the island of Zealand and besieged Copenhagen, triggering yet another war with Britain. On the 26th of February 1808, the king would decree that the Kystmilitsen be raised throughout the country. It was now mandatory for all men aged 20 to 50 in the coastal amts to be part of the Kystmilitsen if they were not in any other military unit. In the ensuing Gunboat War, the kystmilitsen would frequently guard local coastal batteries, which the Danish gunboats could flee to if chased by British ships, forcing them to turn away under fire from its cannons.

== Uniform and equipment ==
The Befalingsmænd or the officers of the Kystmilicien. Their epaulettes differs from a regular officer which wear a different type of epaulettes. Most militia members wore standard civilian attire. Their sole military identifier was a distinctive red Kystmilitscockade (coastal militia cockade) featuring a white cross badge worn on the hat. Armaments varied heavily; some carried only pikes, while others were equipped with muskets, and carbines.
