= Bodenhoffs Plads =

Coordinates: 55.6763°N 12.5992°E

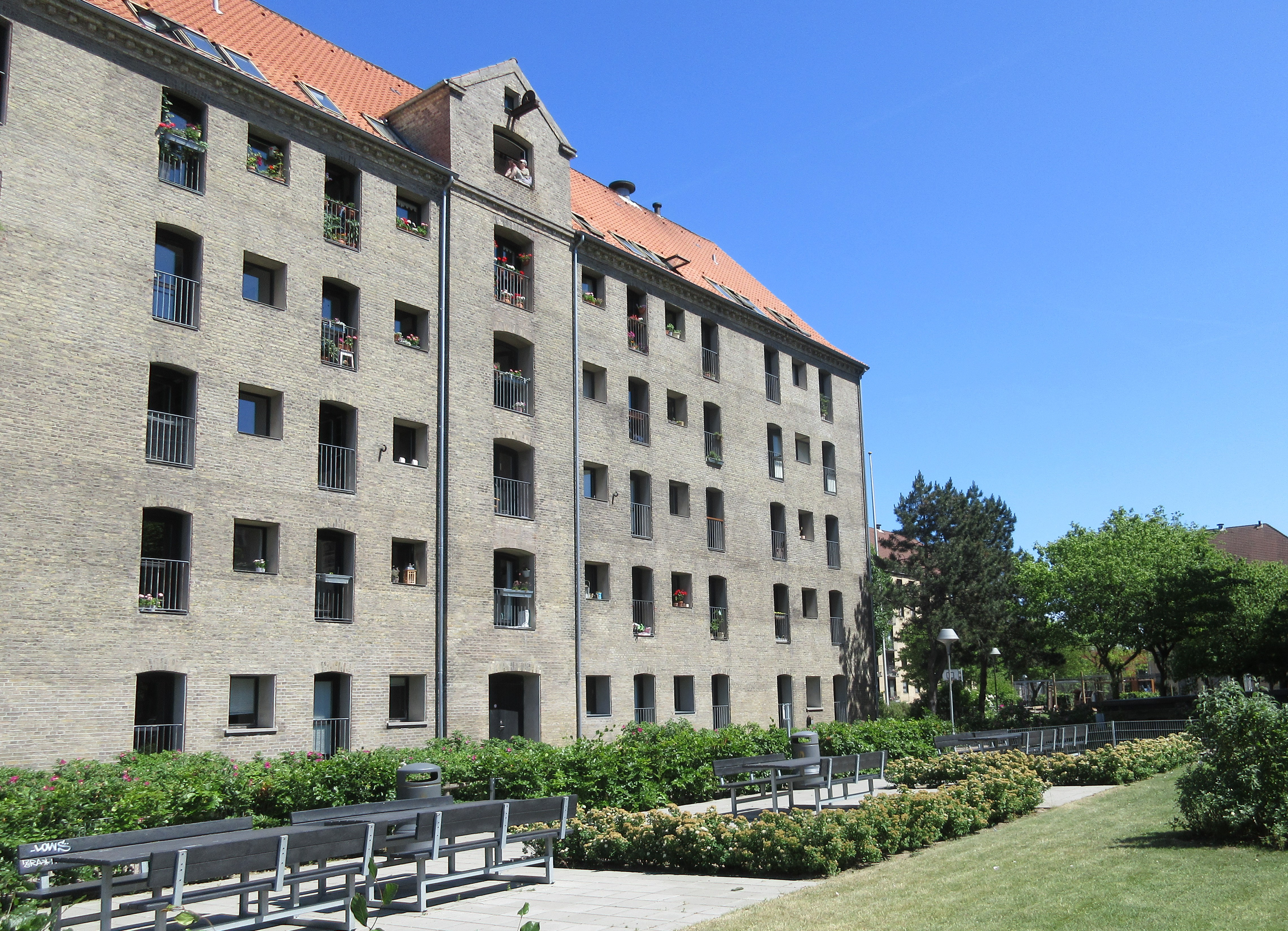
The converted warehouse at Bodenhodds Plads 1-5

Bodenhoffs Plads is an area located in the north-eastern part of Christianshavn, Copenhagen, Denmark. The site is separated from Grønlandske Handels Plads to the west by Christianshavns Kanal and by Trangraven from Holmen to the north. It is connected to both areas by the three-way footbridge Trangravsbroen.

== History ==
=== Andreas Bodenhoff ===
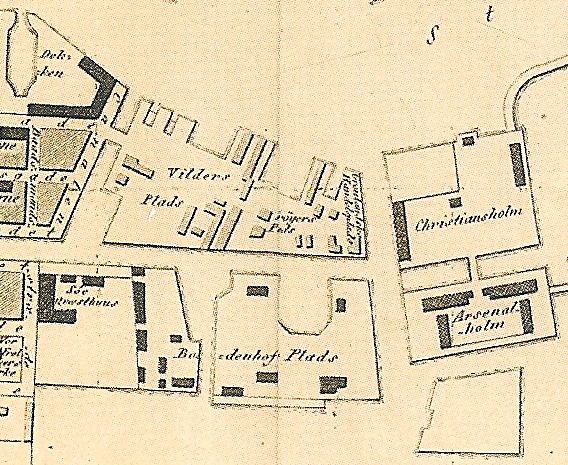
Bodenhoffs Plads (bottom centre) seen on a map detail

The area was reclaimed by Andreas Bodenhoff from 1766 onwards and became known as Bodenhoffs Plads after him. Bodenhoff was the largest supplier of timber for the state from 1652 until 1693. The site was conviently located close to the Royal Danish Dockyard.

Bodenhoffs Plads was originally separated from the rest of Christianshavn by a canal, just like Bjørnsholm, on the other side of Christianshavn Canal, which had been reclaimed some ten years prior by Andreas Bjørn. The site was initially used for storage of timber. Bodenhoff died in 1794.

In 1771, Bodenhoff established his own shipyard on the site. The first ship )120 læster) was launched on 14 December. It was given the name named Margaretha Maria after Bodenhoff's eldest daughter. By 1779, Bodenhoff had a fleet of 28 ships of which 17 ships traded abroad.

Bodenhoff's shipyard would later also work for the navy. The first naval ships constructed at Bodenhoffs Plads were Store Bælt (1782), Frederiksværn (1783) and Hvide Ørn (1784).

=== Kongens Plads, 1798–1832 ===
In 1798, Bodenhoffs Plads was sold to the Royal Danish Navy. The shipyard at Bodenhodds plads was subsequently used for the construction ships of the Royal Danish Navy. Ships constructed for the navy included Brevdrageren (1791), Allart (1807), Hvalrossen (1808) and Lolland (1810).

The site was part of a large property listed in the new cadastre of 1806 as No. 175 on Christianshavn Quarter. It reached all the way from Søkvæsthuset in the south to Bodenhoffs Plads in the north. It was also referred to as Kongens Plads.

=== Hambros Plads ===
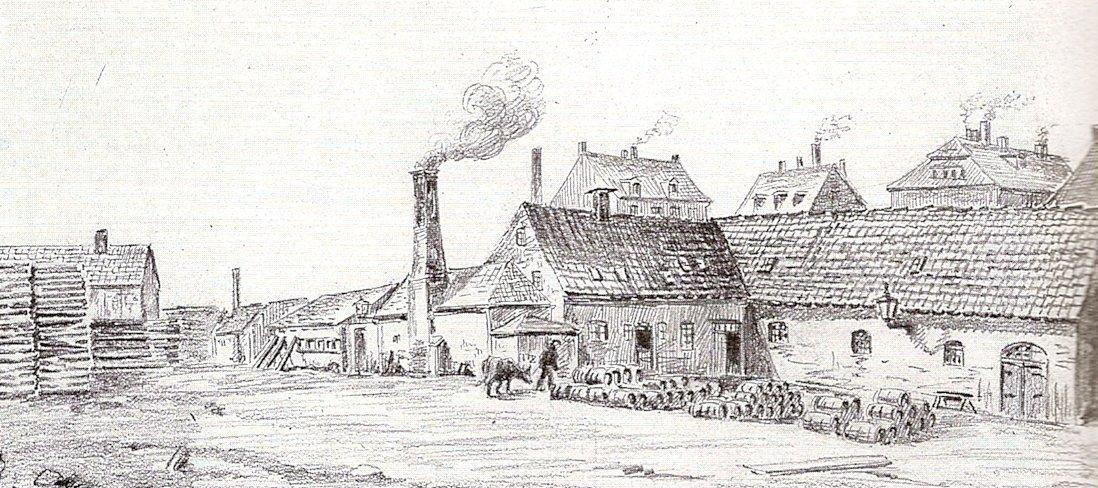
Hambros Plads

In 1832, No. 164 was divided into No. 175 A and No. 175 B.

Bodenhoffs Plads was as No. 175 B sold to Joseph Hambro and was from then on known as Hambros Plads. He established a rice mill and a pig farm at the site. The rice huller was from 1930 powered by Denmark's first steam engine. The chaft from the rice huller was used as feed for the pigs. He then expanded the complex with Denmark's first canned food factory which made it possible to sell the meat to the many ships in the area. He also established a bakery which sold bread to the ships.

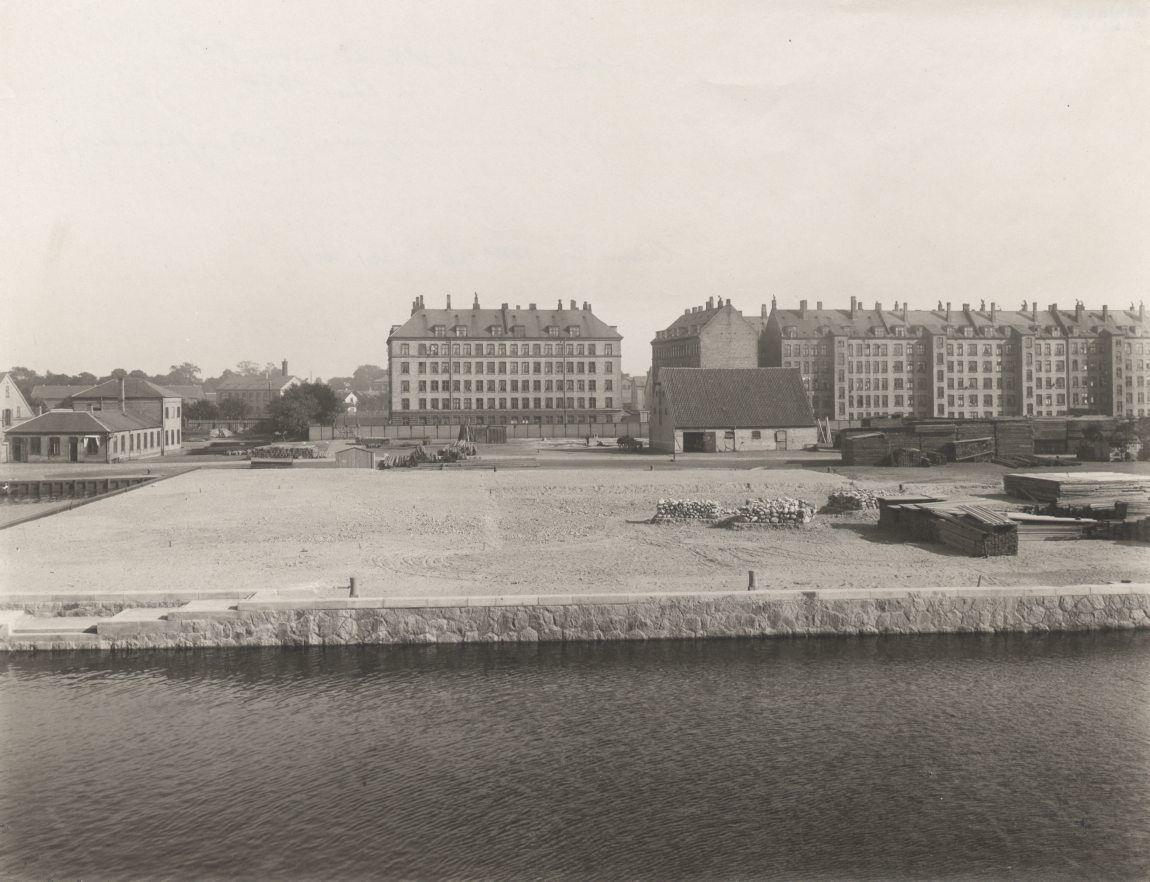
Bodenhoffs Plads seen from the other side of the canal in c. 1895

Hambro's partner, Andreas Nicolai Hansen, played a leading role in the operations of the site. In 1836, he established his own firm under the name A. B. Hansen & Co.. Joseph Hambro's son, Carl Joachim Hambro, moved to London where he founded Hambros Bank. In circa 1840, Joseph Hambro sold his share of Hambros Plads to Hansen. In the 1750s, Hansen took his two eldest sons, Alfred and Harald Hansen, as partners in the firm.

=== Resent history ===
The name was later changed back to Bodenhodds Plads. Most of the northern part of the area was cleared by Dansk Totalenterprise in the early 1970s.

== Buildings ==
No. 8 and 10 date from 1901 and were designed by Erik Schiødte and Rogert Møller. No. 12 is from 1904 and was designed by N.P. Larsen & G.Larsen.

The northern part of the area was cleared by Dansk Totalenterprise in the early 1970s, except for a large warehouse from Islandske Handel. The Islands Plads development (Bodenhoffs Plads 1-17/Prinsessegade 81–95) was built in 1975–78 for Lejerbo to design by BodThorvald Dreyer. The old warehouse (Plads 1–5) contains 40 apartments.
