= HDMS Langeland =

History

Denmark-Norway
- Name: Langeland
- Namesake: Langeland
- Builder: Stibolt, Dorf-Gården, Kiel
- Launched: 2 November 1808
- Commissioned: 1809
- Fate: Transferred to Norway 1814

Norway
- Name: Langeland
- Acquired: 1814 (by transfer)
- Fate: Sold 1827 into merchant service

General characteristics
- Type: Brig
- Displacement: 169 1/2 tons
- Length: 93 ft 6 in (28.50 m) (Danish)
- Beam: 26 ft (7.9 m) (Danish)
- Draught: 10 ft 3 in (3.12 m)(forward) & 11' 3" (aft) - Danish
- Sail plan: Brig
- Complement: 100
- Armament: Initially: 18 × 18-pounder guns; Later: 18 × short 18-pounder guns + 2 × 6-pounder guns

HDMS Langeland, launched in late 1808 and fitted out in 1809, was one of four brigs transferred to Norwegian ports from Denmark on 1 January 1810. From Norway she escorted Danish cargoes or targeted British merchant shipping. She took part in a successful cruise to the North Cape along with the brig Lougen in 1810 and was later taken into the fledgling Norwegian navy after the 1814 Treaty of Kiel. She was sold into merchant service in 1827.

== Danish service ==
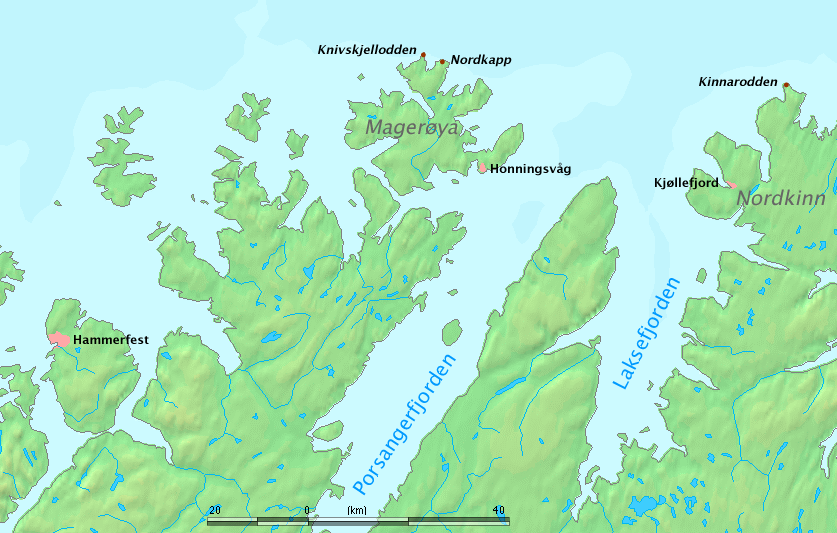
Northern Norway showing Hammerfest, North Cape and Nordkinn

During the summer of 1809, three British gun brigs - the Snake-class brig-sloop HMS Snake (18), brig HMS Nightingale (16), and gun-brig HMS Gallant (14), operated in the far northern waters of Norway. They briefly occupied - after one failed attempt – the small town and sheltered harbour of Hammerfest near North Cape. Senior Lieutenant Thomas Joachim Lütken was captain of the Langeland from 1809 to 1814.I 1810 four brigs were transferred to Norwegian ports. (Note: Fra Krigens Tid lists these as Samsøe, Captain Johannes Krieger; Alsen, Senior Lieutenant M. Lütken; Kiel, Senior Lieutenant Otto F. Rasch, and Langeland, Senior Lieutenant T. Lütken.)

In the spring of 1810 the two Danish-Norwegian brigs Lougen, under the command of Captain J. N. Müller and Langeland sailed from Fredericksværn and reached Hammerfest on the 28 June where they joined with three gun-schooners - Nornen, Valkyren and Axel Thorsen, each of which was armed with a 24-pounder gun fore and aft. The Dano-Norwegians hoped to find the expected British force in the waters of North Cape, for which there were few and poor charts, and no pilotage instructions. However, American merchant ships warned Nightingale and Gallant (Snake had already left), of the Danish presence and they left – apparently to Greenland to escort a convoy of British whalers. With the British gone, the coastal trade with Russia blossomed and a final convoy of the year was escorted into Trondheim, including 11 merchant ships. (Note: In 1811 protection of the north fell to the lesser armed ships. The Norwegian navy maintained a presence until 1816, with an emphasis on improving charts and pilot instructions for these waters.)

== Norwegian Service ==
The Treaty of Kiel in January 1814 separated Norway from Denmark, leaving Norway with a navy of seven brigs (one of which was laid up) and a number of smaller craft. A number of naval officers refused to accept service in the new Norwegian navy until released by the Danish king to whom they had sworn loyalty. Those who joined the Norwegian navy were eventually struck off the Danish lists. Many others obeyed Danish orders and returned to Denmark. Lütken, of the Langeland, was briefly arrested when he refused to hand over the ship to the newly constituted Norwegian State.

The Lolland, which was larger than the other brigs in the new Norwegian Navy, became the command ship of the Norwegian navy’s brig squadron, whose primary mission was to escort food convoys from Jutland, protecting them from Swedish depredations. However, after a short war, Norway and Sweden united, forming a union that lasted until 1905.

- Lolland (Captain Ole Christopher Budde);
- Seagull (Senior Lieutenant J. Lund);
- Allart (Senior Lieutenant S. Lous);
- Langeland (Junior Lieutenant Løvenskiold);
- Alsen (Junior Lieutenant Bendz); and
- Kiel (Junior Lieutenant Petersen).

== Fate ==
In 1827, Langeland was decommissioned and sold into the merchant navy.
