= Ernst Wilhelm Stibolt =

Danish naval officer and ship builder

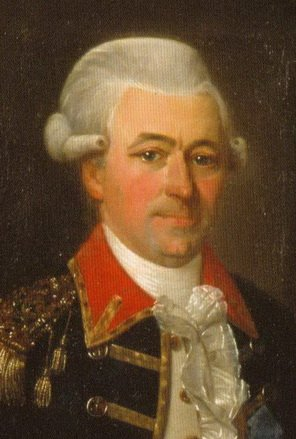

Fabriksmester of Orlægsværftet
- In office 31 July 1790 – 12 February 1796
- Monarch: Christian VII
- Preceded by: Henrik Gerner
- Succeeded by: Frantz Hohlenberg

Personal details
- Born: 14 February 1741 Christiansø, Denmark
- Died: 29 February 1796 (aged 55) Copenhagen, Denmark
- Spouse: Kirsten Güldencrone Kaas (m. 1791)

Ernst Wilhelm Stibolt (born 14 February 1741 – 29 February 1796) was a Danish naval officer and ship builder, who served in the French navy for four years and became a member of the Royal Danish Academy of Sciences and Letters.

== Family ==
E W Stibolt's grandfather, Hans Andersen Stibolt, was Commandant on Christiansø, Denmark's most easterly point, with the army rank of Lieutenant Colonel. He had roots to German nobility.
His father, (naval) Commander Caspar Henrik Stibolt, who became a naturalised Danish citizen in 1777, two years before his death, was also for many years Commandant of Christainsø. He was married twice, the second marriage (to Cathrina von Harrasoffski) giving issue to sixteen children of whom eight, including Ernst Wilhelm, became Danish naval officers. See Stibolt
In 1791 Ernst Wilhelm Stibolt married Kirsten Güldencrone Kaas, the daughter of rear admiral Ulrik Christian Kaas.

== Career ==
From a cadet in the Danish navy in 1760, Stibolt was promoted steadily to captain in 1781 and commander in 1790.

=== Early years ===
Immediately on receiving his first commission Stibolt chose to specialise in ship construction under the tutelage of master shipwright da:Frederik Michael Krabbe and was given a junior position in the Construction Commission, which included in its remit the education of young naval officers. In 1768, together with Henrik Gerner, he embarked on a study tour to England, France and Holland. (Note: Not only did he study ship building, but also water management techniques in Holland. Stibolt was instructed to recruit, if possible, a Dutch engineer with experience in development of docks, dykes, and dams.) He returned in November 1773 to become, in March 1774, a lecturer in ship construction at the naval cadet college, and a member of the Construction Commission. Also in 1774, Stibolt undertook a journey to Christiansø, Frederiksværn, and Trosvig (near Frederikstad on Oslo Fjord), with a view to planning improvements to those harbours. Shortly afterwards he produced the designs for two dredging barges, which were to work at Christiansand. In 1776 he became second-in-command of the ship-of-the-line Mars and a member of the Royal Danish Academy of Sciences and Letters

In the meantime, Gerner had been named the Danish navy's master shipbuilder, so there was no prospect for Stibolt for further promotion in the technical field. In 1778, therefore, he sought permission to go into the service of a foreign power, France, which at that time was engaged in hostilities with Britain during the American Revolutionary War (1775–1783).

=== French Service ===
In the period 1778 to 1782 Stibolt served in three French ships:

- {{ship}French ship|Neptune|1778|2}} (74) (ship-of-the-line)
- HMS Concorde1783 (2) (frigate), before her capture by the British Royal Navy
- Ville de Paris (ship-of-the-line}

Under the admirals Latouche Tréville and Count de Grasse he performed well, together with, among other Danes, Lorentz Fisker, witnessing various naval actions. Stibolt wrote numerous reports back to the Danish admiralty during his service on these ships. He met George Washington during the siege of Yorktown in 1781. On being recalled to Danish service in 1782 he was awarded a pension from the French, which caused much dissatisfaction amongst other Danish officers returning from French service, and was decorated with the Order Pour le merité militaire, which was questioned by some French officers on the grounds that Stibolt had not participated in any major battle. He also came with a glowing reference from Grasse, with whom he maintained a close friendship.

=== After 1782 ===
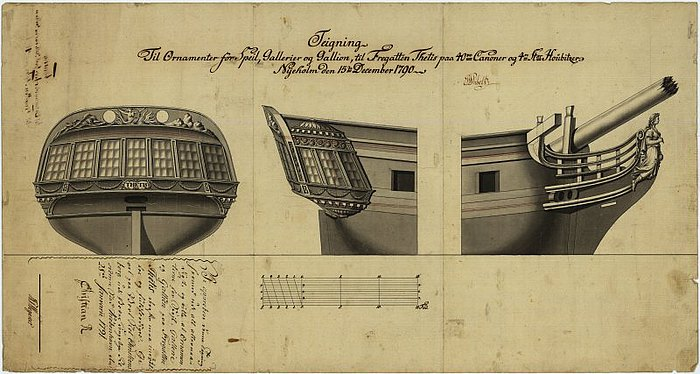
Drawing by Stibolt for the frigate Thetis, 1790

Back in Copenhagen, Stibolt was appointed General Adjutant to the King and produced further reports on the defence works on Christiansø. He was also involved with ship building (including the "unsinkable" defence frigate Hjælperen, which was to take part in the Battle of Copenhagen (1801), but his career was overshadowed by disputes with the master shipbuilder Henrik Gerner, who was considered the better designer. Later disputes with Gerner's pupil (and later master shipbuilder) Hohlenberg also affected Stibolt's health.

With the death of Henrik Gerner in 1787, Stibolt was appointed interim master shipbuilder to the Danish navy in 1788 – a position that was confirmed in 1790.
Some 39 ships of a variety of types plus 37 smaller boats are recorded, (Note: To access the list click orlogbasen then>database>AVANCEREDE> set Konstruktør to "Stibolt" >Søg!) as designed and built by Stibolt, including four ships-of-the-line five frigates and many lesser ships. More ships, especially brigs, were built to Stibolt's design long after his death. Of these, the following are notable:

- Lougen (1791) brig – the first Danish warship to be copper-sheathed
- Lougen (1805) brig

Several of Stibolt's ships were captured at the Battle of Copenhagen (1807)

- Ships-of-the-line: Danmark, Seieren, & Waldemar
- Frigates: Freia, Havfruen, Iris, & Triton
- Brigs: Glommen, Nidelven, & Sarpen, and later Allart (1807)

Long after Stibolt's death, one of his designs for a new ship-of-the-line was used. Laid down in the year after the Battle of Copenhagen (1807), launched in 1810 but not fully fitted out until 1813. This was appropriately named Phoenix.

== Death ==
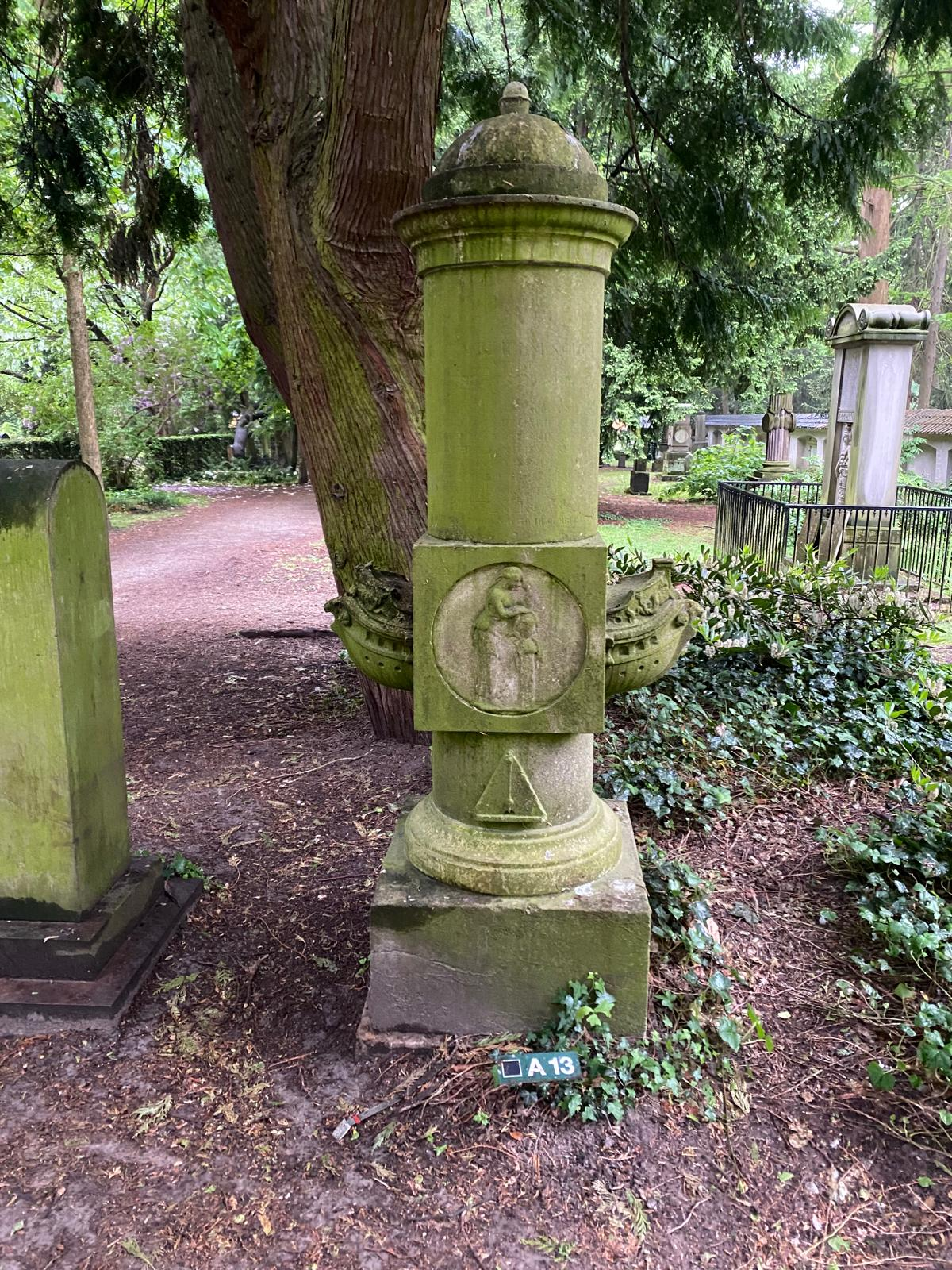
The tomb of Stibolt in the Assistens Cemetery

At the beginning of 1796, suffering from "weakness and a deep melancholy", Stibolt resigned his position, and shortly after on 29 February that year – committed suicide by jumping out of the window in his flat in Toldbodvejen (modern street name Esplanaden). He is buried in the Assistens Cemetery.
