= HDMS Friderichsværn =

Danish frigate captured by the Royal Navy

History

Denmark-Norway
- Name: HDMS Friderichsværn
- Namesake: Staverns Fortress, an early anchorage and shipyard on the Oslo Fjord
- Builder: Gerner, Nyeholm, Copenhagen
- Launched: 1783
- Commissioned: 1784
- Captured: August 1807

United Kingdom
- Name: HMS Frederickscoarn (Note: There is discussion on the Battle of Copenhagen (1807) talk page concerning this accidental renaming.)
- Acquired: 1807 by capture
- Fate: Sold 1814

General characteristics
- Tons burthen: 776 (bm)
- Length: British:130 ft 2 in (39.7 m) (overall); 107 ft 9 3/8 in (32.9 m) (keel)
- Beam: British:36 ft 9 3/8 in (11.2 m)
- Depth of hold: British:9 ft 10 in (3.0 m)
- Complement: Danish:226 (when taken)
- Armament: Danish (when taken): Upper deck:26 × 12-pounder guns; QD/Fc:6 × 6-pounder guns + 6 × 12-pounder carronades

HDMS Friderichsværn was a Danish frigate built at Nyeholm, Copenhagen, in 1783. The British Royal Navy captured her in 1807 and took her into service as HMS Frederickscoarn. It sold her in 1814.

== Construction and design ==
Friderichsværn was constructed at Bodenhoffs Plads from a design by Henrik Gerner. (Note: Technical drawings of the ornamentation of the gallery and windows are available on the Danish database - click "vis".) She was launched on 5 July 1783 and the construction was completed in July 1784.

== Danish service ==
Friderichsværn served her entire Danish career in home waters near Copenhagen. In 1798, under Captain Jost van Dockum, she acted as the cadet training vessel and from 1802 under four different captains as the guard ship in the sound off Copenhagen
Under Captain Henrik Sigismund Gerner Friderichsværn reported on 3 August 1807 that twelve British ships-of-the-line had arrived and anchored to the north of Kronborg. Further, on 7 August, forty transports with troops were identified and reported, then over the following week increasing numbers of transports and of greater and lesser warships. On 13 August, Captain Gerner attempted to follow orders and bring his ship into the Copenhagen naval base but contrary winds and tides forced him to sail northward. HMS Defence and HMS Comus followed Friderichsværn and on 15 August HMS Comus brought her to battle off Marstrand. Friderichsværn suffered 12 dead and twenty other casualties (of which five died later); HMS Comus had two men wounded.

The Battle of Copenhagen (1807) commenced a few days later.

== Capture and Service in the British Navy ==
On 13 August 1807, as the British fleet assembled outside Copenhagen, Friderichsværn was ordered to return to base, but the wind was from the south-east so the captain tried to reach the Kattegat and Norway. Two British Royal Navy ships chased her and the faster HMS Comus soon captured her.

In the action, the British suffered only one man wounded. The Danes lost 12 men killed and 20 wounded, some mortally. In 1847 the Admiralty awarded the Naval General Service Medal with clasp "Comus 15 Augt. 1807", to all surviving claimants from the action.

Friderichsværn entered British service as the British fifth rate frigate Frederickscoarn. She was commissioned under Commander John Martin Hanchet. She arrived at Chatham on 13 November 1807 and was laid up. Between March and June 1811 she underwent fitting at Chatham as a receiving ship. From 1812 to 1814 she was in ordinary at Chatham.

== Fate ==
Frederickscoarn was sold in December 1814 for £1220.
