= HMS Comus (1806) =

Frigate of the Royal Navy

History

United Kingdom
- Name: HMS Comus
- Ordered: 30 January 1805
- Builder: Custance & Co, Great Yarmouth
- Laid down: August 1805
- Launched: 28 August 1806
- Completed: By 19 November 1806
- Commissioned: October 1806
- Honours and awards: Naval General Service Medal with clasp: "Comus 15 Augt. 1807"
- Fate: Wrecked on 24 October 1816; Wreck abandoned on 4 November 1816

General characteristics
- Class & type: 22-gun Laurel-class sixth-rate post ship
- Tons burthen: 52236/94 (bm)
- Length: 120 ft 10 in (36.8 m) (overall); 98 ft 7 in (30.0 m) (keel)
- Beam: 31 ft 6 3/4 in (9.6 m)
- Depth of hold: 10 ft 3 in (3.1 m)
- Propulsion: Sails
- Sail plan: Full-rigged ship
- Complement: 155
- Armament: As built: Upper deck (UD): 22 × 9-pounder guns; QD: 6 × 24-pounder carronades; Fc: 2 × 6-pounder chase guns + 2 × 24-pounder carronades; Later rearmed: UD: 22 × 32-pounder carronades; QD: 6 × 18-pounder carronades; Fc: 2 × 6-pounder chase guns + 2 × 18-pounder carronades

HMS Comus was a 22-gun Laurel-class sixth-rate post ship of the Royal Navy. She was launched in 1806. In 1807 she took part in one notable single-ship action and was at the capture of Copenhagen. In 1815 she spent six months with the West Africa Squadron suppressing the slave trade during which time she captured ten slavers and freed 500-1,000 slaves. She was wrecked in 1816 with no loss of life.

== Canaries ==
She was commissioned in October 1806 under her first captain, Conway Shipley. The following year her boats executed cutting-out operations in the Canaries. On 15 March 1807 her boats, under the command of Lieutenant George Edward Watts, entered "Puerto de Haz" [sic], Grand Canaria, which was defended by the crossfire of three shore batteries. The British succeeded in bringing out six Spanish brigs (one armed with five guns), three with cargoes of salt pork, salt fish, or wine and fruit, and three in ballast. The only British casualty was a lieutenant, who was wounded. That month Comus also captured two brigs, St Philip, with salt fish, and Nostra Senora de los Remedies, with a mixed cargo of merchandise.

On 8 May Comus sent her boats into the harbour of Gran Canaria, which was defended by a strong fort and two shore batteries. There they cut out a large armed felucca, which was flying His Catholic Majesty's colours. The boarding party, under the command of Lieutenant Watts, cleared the felucca's deck of her crew and the boats started to pull her out (the Spaniards had taken the precaution of removing her rudder and sails and taking them on shore), when a tug-of-war developed as men on the quay pulled on a hawser. Eventually the boarding party cut the hawser and the boats succeeded in pulling the felucca out, an operation they conducted under fire. The felucca was the packet ship San Pedro de Apostol, which had been carrying bale goods from Cadiz to Buenos Ayres. On her way, San Pedro de Apostol had captured the Lord Keith, which had been sailing from London to Mogador.

The British lost one man killed and five men wounded, one of whom was Watts, who had been severely wounded. The Spanish casualties included her captain and some crew killed, and 21 men taken prisoner, of whom 19 were wounded. The Lloyd's Patriotic Fund awarded Watts a sword worth £50. The prize money was substantial too. (Note: The share of a petty officer was £28 7s 6d. That of a seaman was £7 6s 5d.)

In May, Comus captured the Spanish lugger St Francisco, with her cargo of wheat and salt. The other capture was the schooner Louisa, a completely new vessel sailing in ballast.

== Comus vs. HDMS Fridericksværn ==
Comus was under Captain Edward Heywood from July 1807, and in August she was with the expedition to Copenhagen. During this service she took part in a one-sided single-ship action with a Danish frigate, and accumulated substantial prize money during this period of her career.

On 12 August the 32-gun Danish frigate HDMS Fridericksværn (listed as Fredrickscoarn in British reports), sailed for Norway from Elsinor and Admiral Lord Gambier sent the 74-gun third rate Defence and Comus after her, even though war had not yet been declared. Comus was faster than Defence in the light winds and so outdistanced her.

On 14 August 1807 Comus sighted Frederiksværn and chased her, catching up off Marstrand a little before midnight on the 15th. Heywood ordered the Frederiksværn to halt and allow herself to be detained. War not having been declared, and Frederiksværn being a naval vessel, she ignored Heywood's instructions. Heywood ordered a musket fired, to which Frederiksværn replied with a shot from her stern guns. Comus followed with a broadside.

After an action of 45 minutes, Frederiksværn's rigging was disabled. Comus and Frederiksværn then came together, which enabled a boarding party from Comus to climb over Frederiksværn's bow and capture her.

The two vessels had been relatively evenly matched in firepower. Comus's broadside weighed 204 pounds, while Frederiksværn's broadside weighed 200 pounds. However, Frederiksværn had a crew of 226 men to Comus's 145 men. Still, the British had suffered only one man wounded. The Danes lost 12 men killed and 20 wounded, some mortally. The Royal Navy took her into service as Frederickscoarn. In 1847 the Admiralty awarded the Naval General Service Medal with clasp "Comus 15 Augt. 1807", to all surviving claimants from the action.

Defence and Comus then sailed in search of a Danish 74-gun reported to be returning to Copenhagen, but did not find her. (Note: This was HDMS Prinds Christian Frederik, which remained at Kristiansand, in Norway. The Royal Navy would capture her in the Battle of Zealand Point.) On 18 August Comus captured the Danish merchant vessel Haabet.

Comus went on to participate in the capitulation of Copenhagen on 7 September and to share in the prize money for that. (Note: The share of a petty officer was £22 11s. That of a seaman was £3 8s.) Comus also shared with Christian VII in the recapture on the same day of the Britannia. Three days later Comus shared with Spencer and Pelican in the capture of the Danish merchant vessel Fredeus Forsward. Later that month, on 9 September, Comus and Pelican captured the Danish merchant vessel Elizabeth vonder Pahlen, but had to share with Defence, which was in sight. Three days after that, on 2 October, Comus and Pelican captured the Danish merchant vessel Anna Catherina. (Note: A commissioned officer received £2 2s 11d in prize money, while a petty officer received 7s 11d and an able seaman 1s 6d.)

== Subsequent service ==
Captain Josceline Percy took command in November 1807, and sailed to Portugal later that month. There Comus participated in the occupation of Madeira by Sir Samuel Hood. Here her primary task was to reconnoiter the island. She returned to Hood's fleet on 23 December and the British took unopposed possession the next day.

Captain Matthew Smith took command in 1808, and Comus continued off the Portuguese coast and in the Mediterranean. On 5 February she captured sundry Danish vessels at St. Ubes (Setubal, Portugal). The vessels Comus captured were the Ovenum, Martha Beata, Aufgehende Sonne, Finegheden, Johannes, Soe Blomstedt, Speculation, Haabet, Fortuna, Bragernes and Magdalena. The initial distribution of prize money amounted to £12,000. Given the small size of her crew, this resulted in a notable amount even for an ordinary seaman. (Note: The first-class share was worth £2450 13s 0d. This compares favourably with the good service pension of £150 (presumably per annum) that Smith was awarded in 1839. A sixth-class share, that of an ordinary seaman, was worth £40 9s 4 1/2d. or about two-years wages. Unfortunately, there does not seem to be any published account of how the Danish vessels happened to be in a Portuguese port and how Comus came to capture them.)

On 27 February 1808 Comus captured the American brig Fame. (Note: The share of a petty officer was £4 18s 7 1/2d. That of an able seaman was £1 5s 6d.)

On 20 February 1811 Comus was part of a flotilla of British warships and Spanish transports under the command of Rear-Admiral Sir Richard Godwin Keats. The flotilla was waiting to land some British troops and 7,000 Spanish troops at Tariffa. The weather did not permit the landing so instead the British troops landed at Algeciras and marched to Tariffa, later being joined by the Spanish troops when the transports could sail.

On 10 May 1812, Smith, on behalf of the British government, signed a treaty of commerce with His Highness Sidi Jusef Caramanli, Bashaw, Bey, Governor and Captain General of the City and Kingdom of Tripoli in the West.

On 14 May 1813 Comus captured the American brig Jane Barnes.

In late March Comus was at Hellevoetsluis to transport French coins that Nathan Rothschild had collected. Rothschild had a contract to deliver £600,000 to the south of France by 14 March. By the time Comus and Thais were able to deliver to Bordeaux the £450,000 that Rothschild had gathered, Napoleon had abdicated.

Comus was under Captain John Tailour from November 1814, during which time she served in the West Africa Squadron. During her service with the Squadron, Comus captured eleven vessels, all of which the Vice admiralty court at Freetown condemned, though the London Commission later reversed four condemnations.

On 16 March 1815 Comus captured the Portuguese slave schooner Dos Amigos off Old Calabar River; she landed one slave. (Note: The first-class share for this vessel was £31 16s 4 3/4d; a sixth-class share was worth 6s 3d.)

Next, on 25 March, Comus was at Duke Town where she captured the Spanish schooners Nuestra Senora del Carmen (120 slaves) and Intrepida (or Intrepide; 245 slaves), and the brig Catalina (no slaves). Among the slaves Comus did free there were 54 boys and 47 girls. Catalina arrived at Portsmouth, in ballast, on 20 October.

Comus also captured two Portuguese vessels, Bon Sorte (61 slaves), and the schooner Estrella (41 slaves). The London Commission reversed the condemnation of Bon Sorte.

Next, Comus captured two Portuguese vessels. On 3 April she captured the brig Santa Anna (three slaves) at Old Calabar River. On 23 April Comus captured the schooner Maria Madelena (no slaves), off "Princes Island". The London Commission reversed the condemnation of Santa Anna.

Comus appears to have been the first warship to have sailed up the Calabar River as far as Duke Town. By one account her boats captured seven Portuguese and Spanish slavers carrying some 550 slaves. First though, they had to overcome the slavers' determined resistance, which resulted in some bloodshed. (Note: An obituary for Tailour states that in six months he captured ten slavers.)

In June Comus captured the Portuguese schooner Novo Fragantina (no slaves) at Anamabo. Then on 15 July at Cape Palmas Comus captured both the Portuguese brigantine Abismo and the Spanish schooner Palafox, neither of which was carrying slaves. The London Commission reversed the condemnation of both Portuguese vessels. (Note: The first-class share for this vessel was £256 12s 10 1/4d; a sixth-class share was worth £2 10s 11 1/2d.)

Captain Thomas Tucker had succeeded Tailour by 1816, and Captain James Gordon Bremer succeeded Tucker.

== Fate ==
Comus was wrecked at St Mary's Bay, off Cape Pine, Newfoundland on 24 October 1816. At around midnight she grounded and developed leaks. The crew abandoned her around 3am when she threatened to roll over on her side as the tide receded. Subsequent efforts to refloat her were unsuccessful. The wreck was abandoned on 4 November 1816. The subsequent court martial blamed the wrecking on a strong current that had driven her closer to shore than Bremer had realized. However, the court also warned Bremer and the master, Bateman Ainsworth, to be more careful in the future, finding that they had been overconfident in their navigation and had failed to take frequent depth soundings. The court added that Bremer, his officers and his crew were due the greatest praise "for their arduous exertions in their endeavours to save her, and also for their good and steady conduct throughout the business, both in the boats and on shore".
