= HDMS Lougen (1805) =

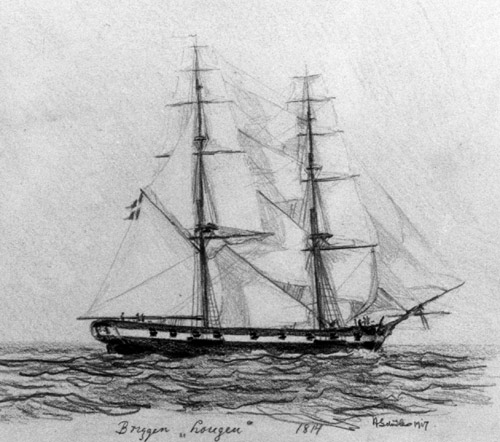
- 1814 drawing of Lougen

History

Denmark
- Name: Lougen
- Builder: Stibolt of Nyholm, Copenhagen
- Launched: 20 July 1805
- Fate: Transferred to Norway in 1814

Norway
- Name: Lougen
- Acquired: 1814
- Decommissioned: Sold to merchant service 1825
- Fate: Wrecked in 1881 at Bremerhaven

General characteristics
- Class & type: Brig-of-war
- Displacement: 310 tons
- Length: 94 ft 4 in (28.75 m) (gundeck); 77 ft (23 m) (keel) (Note: In Danish feet (slightly longer than British feet) she measured 93ft 6in in length by 10ft 6in in beam, with a depth in hold of 10ft 6in.)
- Beam: 27 ft 4 in (8.33 m)
- Depth of hold: 10 ft 3 in (3.12 m)
- Sail plan: Brig
- Complement: 85 men
- Armament: 18 × short 18-pounder guns + 2 × long 6-pounder guns in 1808

HDMS Lougen was a Danish naval brig launched in 1805. She saw service in the Danish navy and participated in two notable actions against the British Royal Navy during the Gunboat War. In 1814, as a result of the Treaty of Kiel, the Danes transferred her to the Norwegian navy. The Norwegians sold her to German merchants in the Scheld in 1825. She was finally shipwrecked near Bremerhaven in 1881.

== Danish Navy ==
=== Lougen vs. Childers ===
On 14 March 1808 Lougen found the British brig Childers engaged in escort duty in Norwegian waters. Lougen tried over the course of several hours to bring about an engagement, and eventually succeeded, but Childers escaped much damaged though her crew did suffer casualties.

=== Lougen vs. Seagull ===
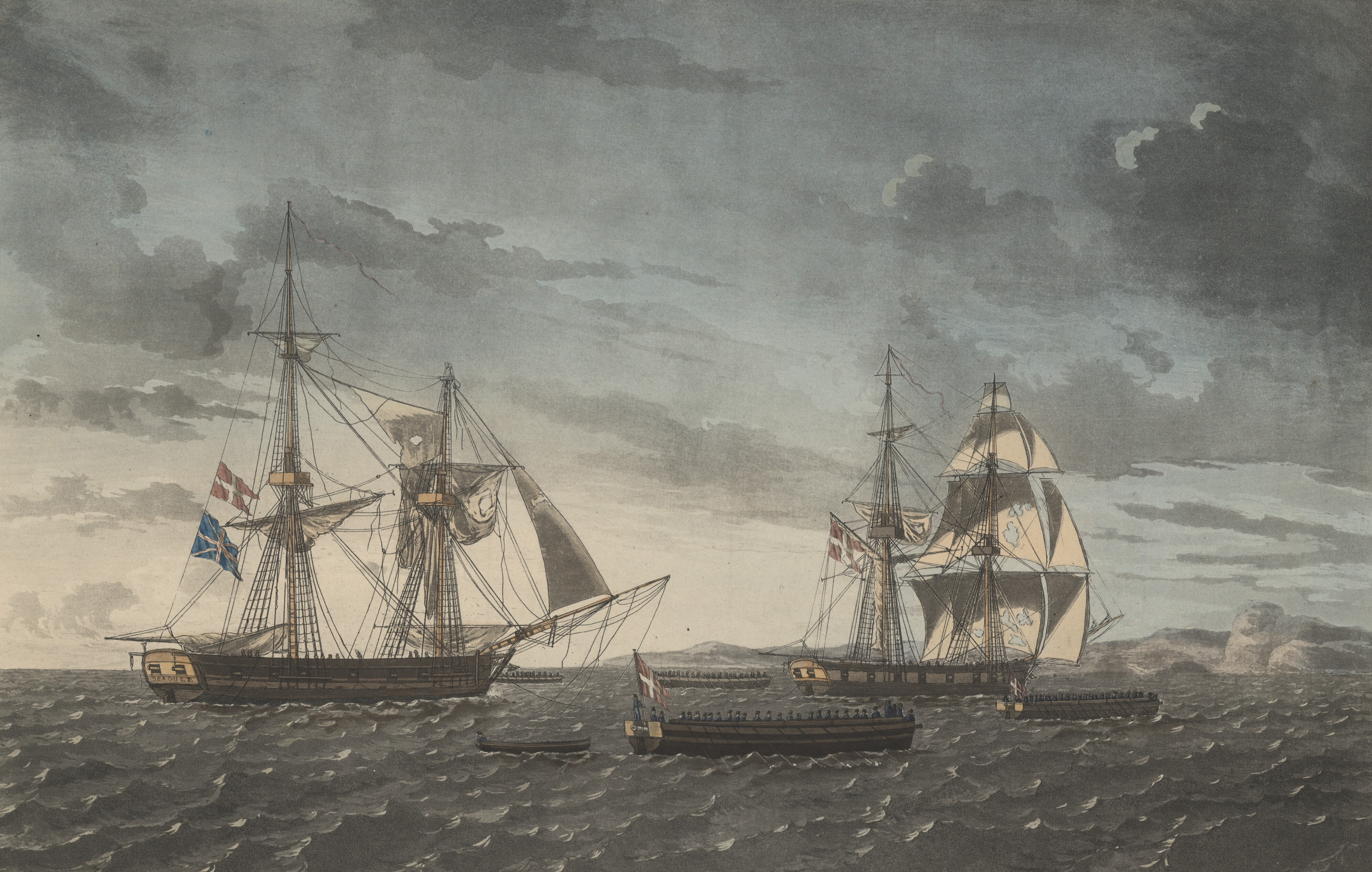
Lougen towing the captured HMS Seagull on 19 June 1808

On Sunday, 19 June 1808, off the Naze of Norway in the vicinity of the port of Kristiansand, Seagull encountered and chased Lougen. Lougen, under the command of First Lieutenant Peter Frederik Wulff, tried to maintain a distance from Seagull to take advantage of the range of her 18-pounders relative to the range of Seagull's 24-pounder carronades. The chase brought both vessels close in shore where the fresh breeze was lessening to a near calm. Seagull tried to get between Lougen and the shore to prevent her from reaching Kristiansand.

Unfortunately for Seagull, about 20 minutes into the engagement six Danish gunboats arrived from behind some rocks, and in two divisions of three each, took up positions on Seagull's quarter, where they fired on her with their 24-pounder guns while Lougen fired on her larboard bow. Within half an hour the Danish fire had badly damaged Seagull's rigging and dismounted five of her guns. Eventually Seagull's captain, Commander Robert B. Cathcart, who was himself severely wounded, struck, having lost eight men killed and 20 wounded. Lougen had only one man killed and a dozen men slightly wounded.

Shortly after Seagull had surrendered, and after her crew and wounded had been taken off, she sank. A number of the prize crew from the Lougen drowned as Seagull sank. The Danes later recovered Seagull and took her into their naval service.

=== In Northern Waters ===
Jochum Nicolay Müller, a native of Trondheim, took command of Lougen in 1809. During the summer of 1809, three British vessels – HMS Snake (18; Commander Thomas Young), HMS Nightingale (16), and HMS Gallant (14) – operated in the far northern waters of Norway, briefly occupying, after one failed attempt, the small town and sheltered harbour of Hammerfest near North Cape.

In the spring of 1810 the two Danish-Norwegian brigs Lougen and Langeland (under the newly promoted Captain Müller and Senior Lieutenant Thomas Lütken, respectively) left Fredericksværn and reached Hammerfest on 28 June. Three gun-schooners - Nornen, Valkyren, and Axel Thorsen - each with two 24-pounder guns, one fore and one aft – had joined them en route. This squadron sailed to find the British squadron in the waters of North Cape, for which, however, there were few and poor charts, and no pilotage instructions. The two remaining British ships, Nightingale and Gallant, had been warned of the Danes' approach and had left, apparently having sailed to Greenland to escort a convoy of British whalers. With the British gone, the Pomor trade with Russia boomed and the Danish vessels escorted a final convoy of the year into Trondheim, including 11 prize merchant ships. (Note: In 1811 protection of the north fell to the smaller ships; first the Dane-Norwegian navy and then the Norwegian navy maintained a naval presence in the area until 1816, but the primary mission became one of improving charts and pilot instructions for these waters.)

On 31 July 1811, Lougen, in company with the brigs Lolland and Kiel, encountered HMS Brev Drageren and HMS Algerine cruising together in Long Sound, Norway. (Note: James reports that the three Danish vessels were the 20-gun Langeland, the 18-gun Lügum, and the 16-gun Kiel. However, there are no Danish records of any vessel with the name Lügum, or anything like it, and one can infer from a biography of the captain of Langeland that she was not present at the action.) The Danes had 54 guns and 480 men, against the British 22 guns and 107 men. (Note: The Naval Chronicle gives the Danish strength as 60 guns (all long 18-pounders), and 550 men.) Outnumbered and outgunned, the British withdrew. The next day Brev Drageren unsuccessfully re-engaged first one and then two of the brigs. In the inconclusive engagement both British vessels lost one man killed, and Brev Drageren also had three men wounded. In the second day's fight, Algerine sent a boat and sweeps to Brev Drageren, which helped her escape the Danes, though not until after her crew had rowed for 30 hours. Lolland captured two mercantile galleasses that Brev Drageren had been escorting.

== Fate ==
After the Treaty of Kiel and Norway's separation from Denmark, Lougen was transferred to the Norwegian navy in 1814. In 1825 the Norwegians sold her into the merchant navy and she moved to the Scheldt. She was shipwrecked in 1881 at Bremerhaven.
