= HMS Seagull (1805) =

Brig-sloop of the Royal Navy

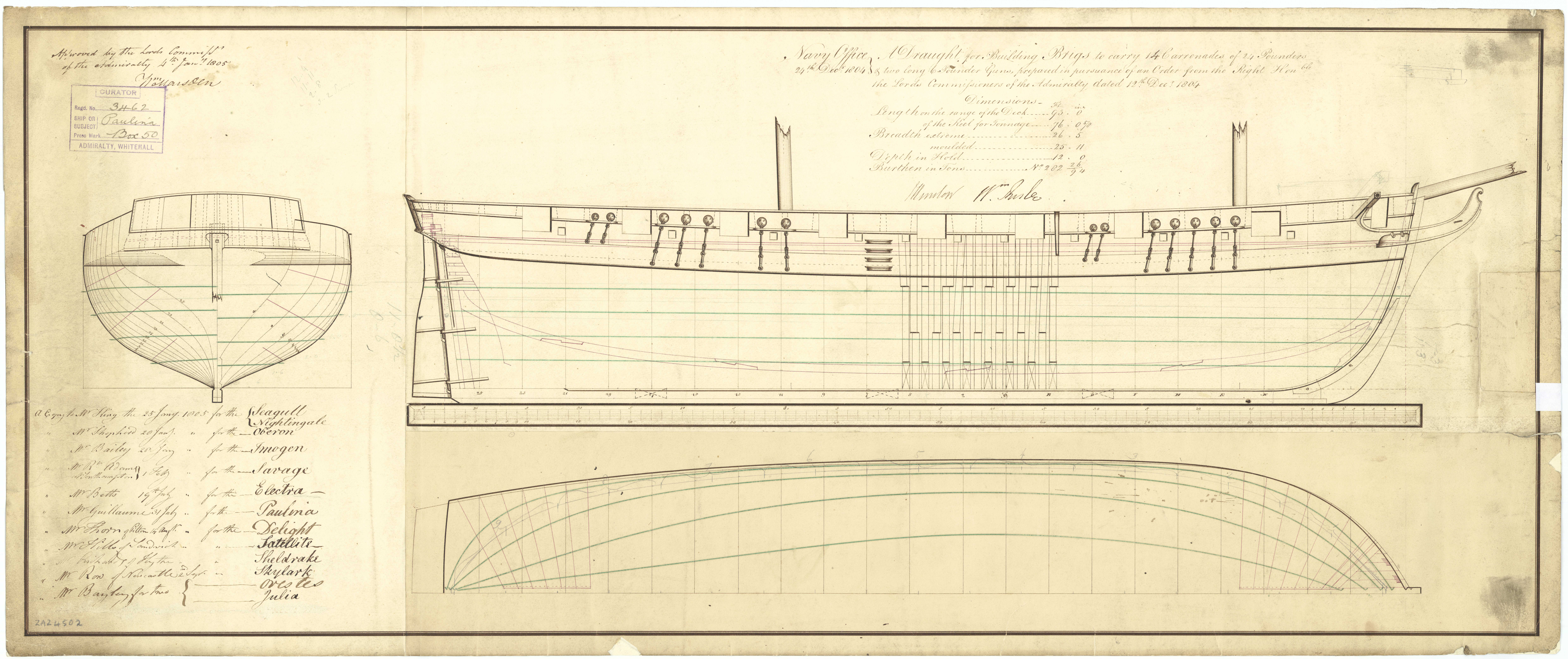
- Ship plan of Seagull

History

United Kingdom
- Name: HMS Seagull
- Ordered: 12 December 1804
- Builder: John King, Dover
- Laid down: January 1803
- Launched: 1 July 1805
- Captured: 19 June 1808

Denmark-Norway
- Name: Seagull
- Acquired: 19 June 1808 (by capture)
- Fate: Transferred to Norway 1814

Norway
- Name: Seagull
- Acquired: 1814 (by transfer)
- Decommissioned: 1817

General characteristics
- Class & type: Seagull-class brig-sloop
- Tons burthen: 284 86/94 (bm)
- Length: 93 ft 1 1/4 in (28.4 m) (overall); 76 ft 1 3/4 in (23.2 m) (keel)
- Beam: 26 ft 6 in (8.1 m)
- Depth of hold: 12 ft 0 in (3.7 m)
- Sail plan: Brig
- Complement: 95
- Armament: British service: 14 × 24-pounder carronades + 2 × 6-pounder bow guns; Danish service: 16 × short 18-pounder guns + 2 × 6-pounder bow guns

HMS Seagull was a 16-gun Seagull-class brig-sloop of the Royal Navy. She was launched on 1 July 1805 and saw active service in Danish waters until 19 June 1808 when Dano-Norwegian forces captured her. Though she sank shortly after being captured, the Danes raised her and refitted her for service in the Royal Dano-Norwegian Navy, which she served until the end of the English Wars in 1814. She then was transferred to the Royal Norwegian Navy before being decommissioned in 1817.

== British service (1805–1808) ==
Seagull was commissioned under Commander Robert Cathcart in August 1805.

O 10 April 1806 she sent a Prussian galiot into the Downs. She was active in 1807 in the North Sea and the Downs and received prize money for the following captures, either alone or in company with other British vessels.

- Venus (8 July); This was the Venus, of Pappenburg, which had been sailing from Christiana to France;
- Resolution (27 August);
- Aurora (27 August);
- Gabriel (27 August);
- Karen and Amalia (27 August);
- Emanuel (28 August);
- Dolphin (28 August);
- Haabet Ankes (28 August); and
- Fly (31 October).

In addition, she recaptured two ships:

- Jane (24 February); and
- the transport brig Elizabeth (15 November).

Three privateers had captured Elizabeth, Edwards, master, on 15 October. as Dove was coming from Copenhagen. Seagull brought her into Dover.

Lastly, Seagull's boats retrieved Dove, which they found drifting and derelict on 29 August 1807 off the coast of France. Dove, of Weymouth, had a cargo of stone. Seagull brought her into the Downs.

=== Capture ===
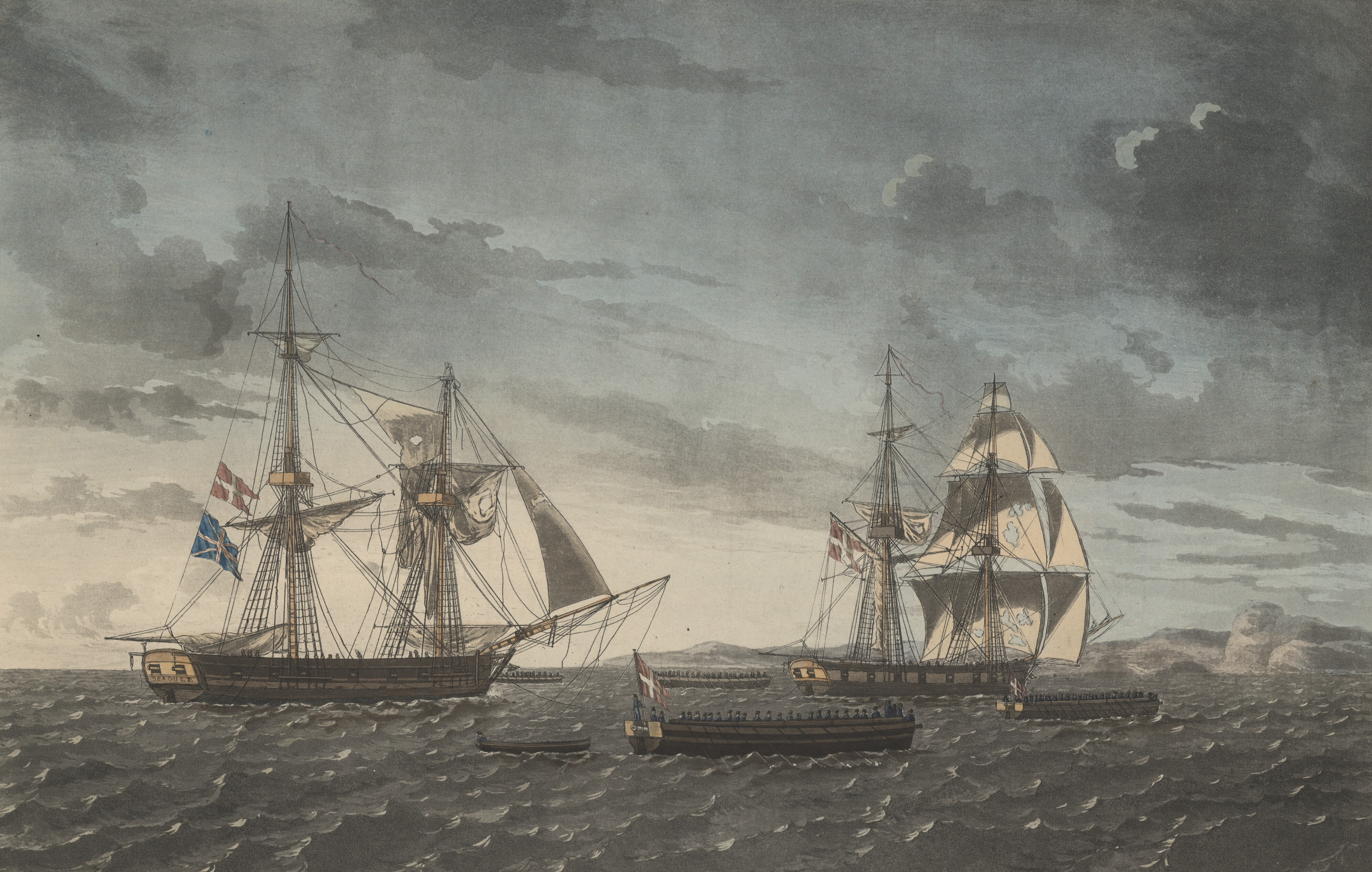
HDMS Lougen towing the captured Seagull on 19 June 1808

On 19 June 1808, off the Naze of Norway in the vicinity of the port of Kristiansand, Seagull chased the Dano-Norwegian brig Lougen, which was armed with eighteen short 18-pounder guns and two long 6-pounder guns. Lougen, under the command of 1st Lieutenant Peter Frederik Wulff, tried to maintain some distance between herself and Seagull to take advantage of the longer range of Lougen's 18-pounder guns relative to the range of Seagull's 24-pounder carronades.

The chase brought both vessels close in shore where the breeze was lessening to a near calm. Seagull tried to get between Lougen and the shore to prevent the Dane from reaching Kristiansand.

Unfortunately for Seagull, about 20 minutes into the engagement six Danish gunboats arrived from behind some rocks and in two divisions of three each took up positions on Seagull's quarter, where they fired on her with their 24-pounder guns while Lougen fired on her larboard bow. Within half an hour the Danish fire had badly damaged Seagull's rigging and dismounted five of her guns. Eventually Cathcart, who was himself severely wounded, struck, having lost eight men killed and 20 wounded. Vice-Admiral Thomas Wells, on reading the battle report, expressed his strong opinion that such gallantry should be made public. Lougen had only one man killed and a dozen men slightly wounded.

The Danes held Cathcart as a prisoner of war until October 1808. In November he, his officers and crew were tried aboard Gladiator for the loss of their ship. The court honourably acquitted them all and the senior officer of the board returned Cathcart's sword to him. Cathcart received promotion to post-captain and his first lieutenant, Villiers Francis Hatton, received promotion to commander. Cathcart's promotion was backdated to the date of the action. He received command of Ganymede and took the survivors from Seagull with him.

Shortly after the action the Danes promoted Wulff to lieutenant-commander and he was elevated to knight of Danneborg.

== Danish service (1808–1814) ==
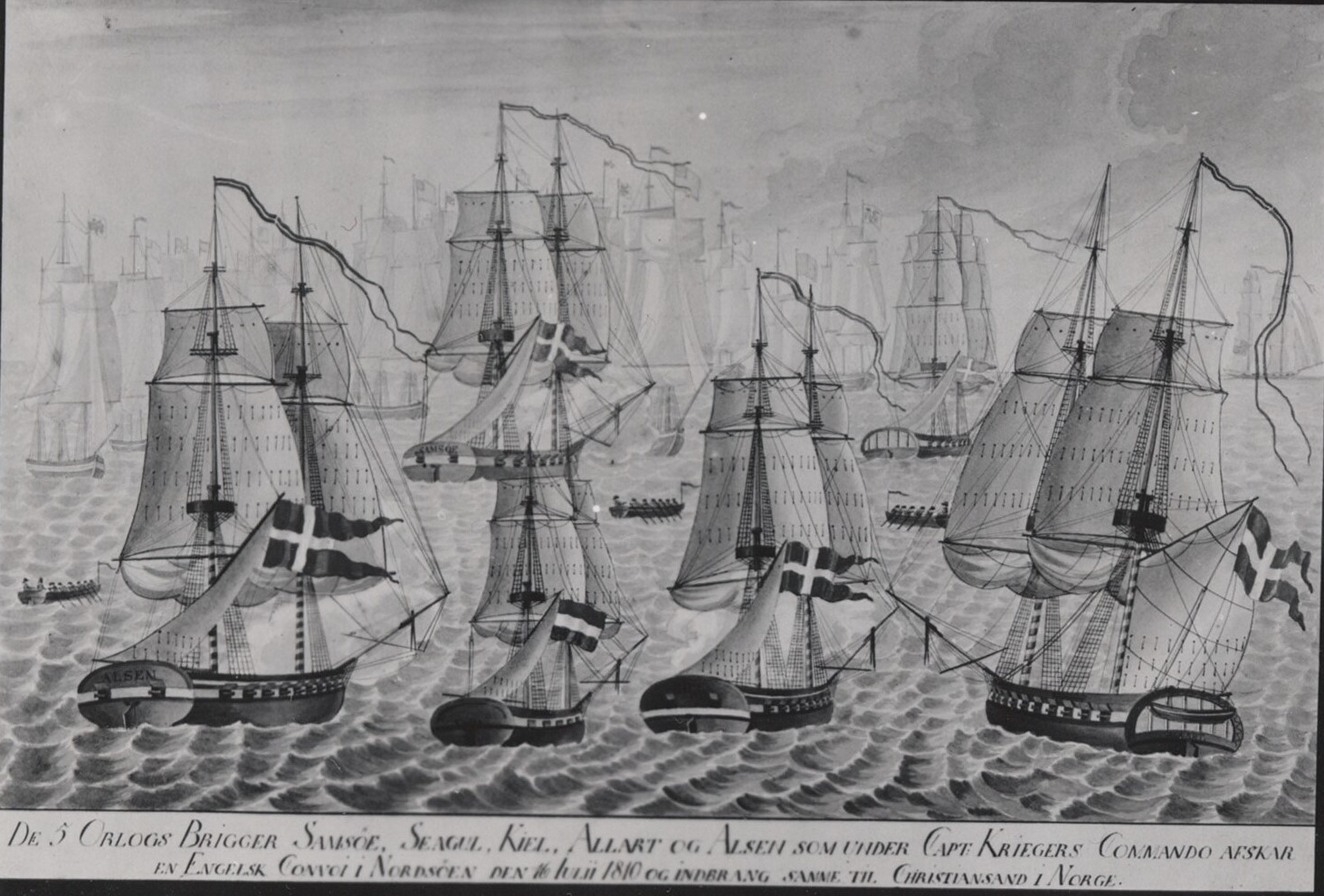
The Danish brigs Samsøe, Seagull, Kiel, Allart, and Alsen attacking a British convoy in the North Sea on 16 July 1810

The Danes removed the crew of Seagull, including the dead and wounded, and sent damage control parties aboard. However, Seagull had more than five feet of water in her hull and sank suddenly, drowning several Danes. Lieutenant Wigelsen, second in command of Lougen, took command of the prize and recorded in his personal diary:

I took command of the prize. She had taken a great many direct hits in the bows as well as the side. So many hits that the holes were large and irregular and could not be plugged by normal methods. When I came on board the water was already over the lower decks and was rising fast. I managed to get the ship into harbour, however, and run aground. A little past midnight, she capsized and I had to escape by swimming. Happily, we later managed to raise the brig and she was used to good effect in the war.

Still, Seagull had sunk in the relatively shallow waters of Fosseholmen Bay some five miles (8.0 km) southwest of Kristiansand, with her port bulwark remaining above the water. The Danes were able later to raise and refit her for service with the Dano-Norwegian Navy. She was commissioned under 1st. Lieutenant O. Kr. Budde. On 25 November 1808, this ship, now known simply in Danish records as Seagull, successfully fought and captured a Swedish gunboat, Gripen. Seagull was operating out of Kristiansand, and the capture was effected off Skagen. Gripen was armed with nine guns (four 3-pounders, four 12-pounders, and a 36-pounder howitzer), and had a crew of 40 men under the command of Lieutenant Molbergs Besaling. (Note: Gripen failed to sell as a gunboat at a later auction and was converted to a merchant vessel in 1809. Her name was changed to the Danish spelling Gribben.)

On 12 May 1810, Seagull participated in a skirmish against the British 36-gun Tribune off Mandahl (present day Mandal, Norway). In all, four Danish brigs and several gunboats attacked Tribune before retiring back to Mandahl. Tribune suffered nine men and boys killed, and 15 seamen and marines wounded. In the aftermath of the Battle of Lyngør, a British reconnaissance by the cutter HMS Nimble of Danish warships in the area reported the presence of Seagull, of 16 guns and 100 men, lying at Christiansand - but concluded that the Danes could effect nothing of importance that summer (of 1812). By 1813, Seagull was under the command of Kapteinløitnant C. Lütken. In late December Seagull, Lolland, and Samsøe sailed to Frederickshavn, Jutland to escort a convoy of vessels carrying much-needed grain to Norway. They succeeded in their mission, although they lost one of the grain ships to a Swedish privateer.

== Norwegian service (1814–1817) ==
At the end of the Anglo-Danish wars, Norway separated from Denmark. The Seagull, which was based in Kristiansand, became part of the Royal Norwegian Navy. She was decommissioned in 1817.
