= HDMS Lolland =

History

Denmark-Norway
- Name: Lolland or Laaland (Note: Laaland is an alternative spelling of Lolland)
- Namesake: Lolland
- Builder: Pihl, Bodenhoffs Plads (Copenhagen)
- Launched: 7 March 1810
- Fate: Transferred to Norway 1814

Norway
- Name: Lolland
- Acquired: 1814 (by transfer)
- Fate: Sold 1847

General characteristics
- Type: Brig
- Displacement: 231 1/4 tons
- Length: 98 ft 8 in (30.07 m) (Danish)
- Beam: 26 ft 6 in (8.08 m) (Danish)
- Draught: 11 ft 6 in (3.51 m)(forward) & 12' 4" (aft) - Danish
- Sail plan: Brig
- Complement: 99 (later 120 men)
- Armament: Initially: 18 × 18-pounder guns; Later: 8 × long 18-pounder + 8 × short 18-pounder + 2 × 6-pounder guns

HDMS Lolland (or Laaland) was launched in March 1810. She served in at least four major engagements during the Gunboat War before she was transferred to the Norwegian navy after the Treaty of Kiel brought about the separation of Norway from Denmark in 1814. Lolland continued to serve with the Norwegian Navy until sold in 1847.

== Dano-Norwegian navy ==
For three months from 9 June 1810, Lolland served as a training ship for naval cadets at Copenhagen naval base. At the time she was under the command of Senior Lieutenant (later Captain) Holger Johan Bahnsen. Also on board was Senior Lieutenant Georg Joachim Grodtschilling, a mathematics teacher at the naval academy. (Note: Georg Grodtschilling was killed aboard Najaden at the Battle of Lyngør in 1812.)

=== 1811 ===
On 6 March 1811, Lolland sailed to her new station as part of the naval defences of southern Norway, where she was the command ship for a division of brigs. The year would be a tumultuous one for Lolland as she would engage in three actions against British warships under her new captain, Hans Peter Holm.

By the 1 May 1811, Lolland had returned to the southern approaches to Egersund (SW Norway) with four other brigs, unknown to the British. The British sent four boats from HMS Belette, HMS Cherokee and HMS Clio, into the western end of the sound, expecting to capture some shipping or do other mischief. The circumstances of locality and wind did not permit the Danish brigs to enter the sound from the further end, but Holm sent the Danish ships’ boats under Lieutenant Niels Gerhardt Langemach to oppose the British. Some of the Danes landed to set an ambush from the cliff tops, whilst the armed boats were hidden behind a skerry. As the British rowed boldly in, they met unexpected fire from howitzers and muskets; they immediately withdrew, with the Danish boats in pursuit. The Danes captured one of the British boats and her crew of an officer and 17 men, who had come from Belette, and would have captured more but for the confusion that the explosion of a powder keg on one of the Danish boats caused. This enabled the remaining British boats to reach the protection of their squadron.

On 31 July 1811, Lolland, in company with the brigs Lougen and Kiel, encountered HMS Brev Drageren and HMS Algerine cruising together in Long Sound, Norway. (Note: James reports that the three Danish vessels were the 20-gun Langeland, the 18-gun Lügum, and the 16-gun Kiel. However, there are no Danish records of any vessel with the name Lügum, or anything like it, and one can infer from a biography of the captain of Langeland that she was not present at the action.) The Danes had 54 guns and 480 men, against the British 22 guns and 107 men. (Note: The Naval Chronicle gives the Danish strength as 60 guns (all long 18-pounders), and 550 men.) Outnumbered and outgunned, the British vessels took flight.

The next day Brev Drageren unsuccessfully re-engaged first one and then two of the brigs. In the inconclusive engagement each British vessel sustained one man killed, and Brev Drageren also had three wounded. In the second day’s fight, Algerine sent a boat and sweeps to Brev Drageren, which helped her escape the Danes, though not until after her crew had rowed for 30 hours. Lolland captured two cargo ships (galleases) that Brev Drageren had been escorting.

On 17 August 1811 HMS Manly sailed from Sheerness with a convoy for the Baltic under Lieutenant Richard William Simmonds. On 2 September 1811, off Randøerne, some 30 miles SE of Arendal on the Norwegian coast in company with HMS Chanticleer they encountered three Danish 18-gun-brigs: Lolland, Alsen (Senior Lieutenant M. Lütken), and Samsø (Senior Lieutenant Ridder F. Grodtschilling).

The Danish brigs were sailing westward along the coast when they sighted the two strange vessels, which by their night signals appeared to be enemy. The Danes set out in pursuit, with Samsø, which was closest, sailing for the nearer of the enemy vessels, Alsen and Lolland following. However, their quarry - the Chanticleer turned south-east, and Samsø and Alsen followed. Lolland then set off after the second ship, the Manly.

By 0340hrs Lolland had caught up with Manly. Combat began at 0445hrs and at 0540hrs Lolland succeeded in crossing behind her quarry, which then struck at 0555hrs. Lolland sent a prize crew over that brought back Lieutenant Simmonds, of Manly. In rough seas, neither Alsen nor Samsøe could catch HMS Chanticleer and so gave up the chase.

Lolland had lost one man killed but had had no wounded; neither of the other two Danish vessels had sustained any casualties. Lolland had slight damage to her rigging and sails, but none to her hull; the other two Danish vessels reported negligible damage. The Danes took Manly into service, retaining her name and armament. Later that year, Captain Anthonius Krieger replaced Holm as captain of Lolland.

=== 1812 ===
In 1812, the Danish-Norwegian naval forces based in Norway were utilizing a sheltered but weakly defended anchorage at Sandoya. The Dano-Norwegian force consisted of the frigate Najaden, three brigs - Lolland, Kiel (under the command of Otto Frederick Rasch), and Samsøe - as well as a number of gunboats. The British saw an opportunity to break the back of Dano-Norwegian seapower and sent the 64-gun third rate ship-of-the-line Dictator and three brigs, the 18-gun Cruizer-class brig-sloop Calypso, 14-gun brig-sloop Podargus and the 14-gun gun brig Flamer to seek out the Danes.

The encounter took place on 6 July 1812 at Lyngør.

The British sank Najaden and took Lolland and Kiel as prizes. However the British had to abandon their prizes after the two vessels grounded. The British did not set fire to either as they still had their crews and wounded aboard. The action cost the British nine men killed, 26 wounded, and two missing. Overall, the Danes acknowledged losing 300 men killed or wounded.

=== 1813 ===
In late December 1813 Lolland, The Seagull, and Samsøe sailed to Frederickshavn, Jutland to escort a convoy of some 45 vessels carrying much-needed grain to Norway. They succeeded in their mission, although they lost one of the grain ships to a Swedish privateer. During the mission, a storm forced Samsøe to seek shelter in Danish waters; as a result, at the separation of Norway from Denmark, Samsøe remained with the Danish navy. until 1819.

== Norwegian Navy ==
The separation in 1814 after the Treaty of Kiel of Norway from Denmark left Norway with a severely depleted cadre of naval officers and six active-duty brigs, of which Lolland was the largest. In May Budde took command of Lolland, which became the command ship of the Norwegian navy’s brig squadron. The brigs Lolland, Seagull, Alsen and Kiel had sailed to Frederickhavn to escort a large convoy of some 80 much-needed grain ships from Denmark to Norway. In the Skagerrak two Swedish frigates, the Eurydice (44) and the af Chapman (36), tried to capture the convoy and its escorts but the Eurydice was too far way to be effective. The four Norwegian brigs, under orders not to fire unless first fired on, boxed in the af Chapman until the convoy successfully reached Norwegian waters.

== Fate ==
Lolland received a major refit in 1831. She was sold in 1847.
