= HMS Podargus =

Brig-sloop of the Royal Navy

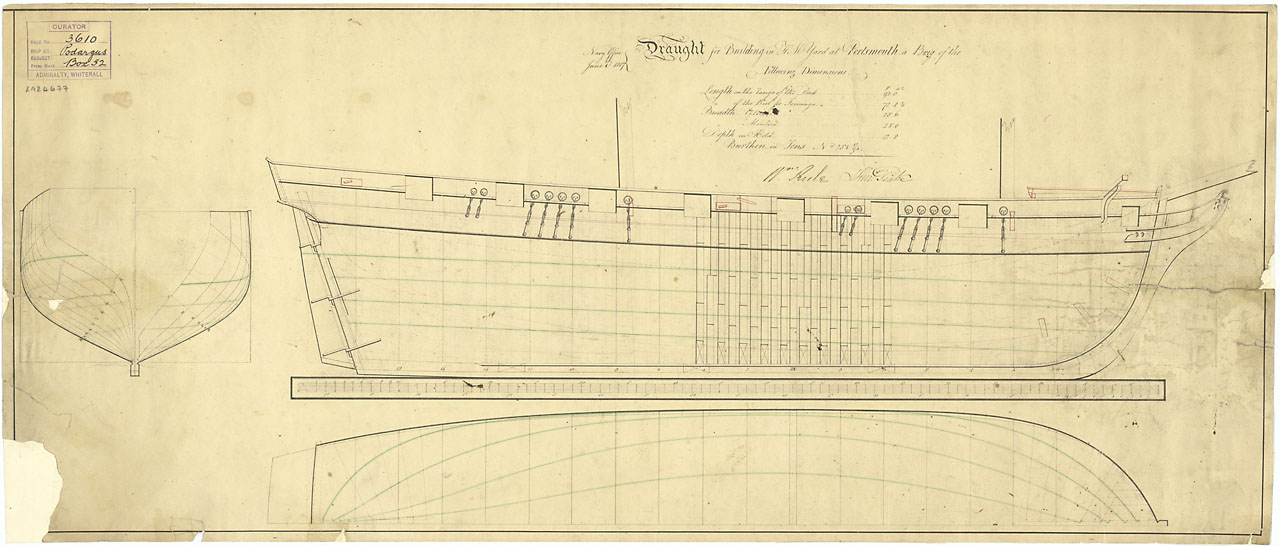
- Podargus

History

United Kingdom
- Name: HMS Podargus
- Ordered: 30 March 1807
- Builder: Portsmouth Dockyard (M/s Nicholas Diddams)
- Laid down: November 1807
- Launched: 26 May 1808
- Honours and awards: Naval General Service Medal with clasp "Off Mardoe 6 July 1812"
- Fate: Sold 1833 for breaking up

General characteristics
- Class & type: Crocus-class
- Type: Brig-sloop
- Tons burthen: 25177/94 (bm)
- Length: 92 ft 0 in (28.0 m) (gundeck); 72 ft 8 1/4 in (22.2 m) (keel)
- Beam: 25 ft 6 1/4 in (7.8 m)
- Depth of hold: 12 ft 8 in (3.9 m)
- Sail plan: Brig rigged
- Complement: 86
- Armament: 2 × 6-pounder bow chasers; 12 × 24-pounder carronades

HMS Podargus was a Crocus-class brig-sloop of the Royal Navy. She participated in one major battle during the Gunboat War between Britain and Denmark. After the war, she served at Saint Helena for five or six years. On her return to Britain in 1820, she was laid up; she was finally sold in 1833.

== Career ==
Commander William Hellard commissioned Podargus in September 1808 for the Downs. On 15 August 1809, Podargus's master and a master's mate arrived at the French prisoner-of-war prison at Verdun. The master's mate escaped in 1813, but it is not clear how the men came to be captured.

On 19 August 1809 Podargus captured the Fortuna. Three days later she recaptured the Margaretha. Alphea was in sight for the recapture of the Margretha. Podargus also carried Major General Broderick and his suite to Corunna.

Commander John Lloyd recommissioned Podargus in November 1810. On 2 December Podargus was on station off Boulogne when her crew retrieved an abandoned, swamped Dutch boat. The boat had to be over-turned to bring her on board Podargus, but even so, money was found aboard her, amounting to 13 gold guineas, four half-guineas, and some silver French coins. Then in October 1811 Commander John Bradley replaced Lloyd.

Commander William Robilliard commissioned Podargus in November 1811 for the Baltic. On 4 October 1812 Podargus captured the Danish sloop Speculation and shared the prize money with Persian, Erebus, Woodlark and Plover by agreement. (Note: a first-class share of the prize money was worth £5 15s 5d; a sixth-class share, that of an ordinary seaman, was worth 2s 4d.) Then on 17 October Persian and Erebus were again in company with Podargus when Podargus captured the Danish vessels Anna Maria, Twende Brodre, and two market-boats. Next month, on 11 November Podargus captured Syerstadt, with Persian and Erebus in company.

=== Napoleonic Wars ===
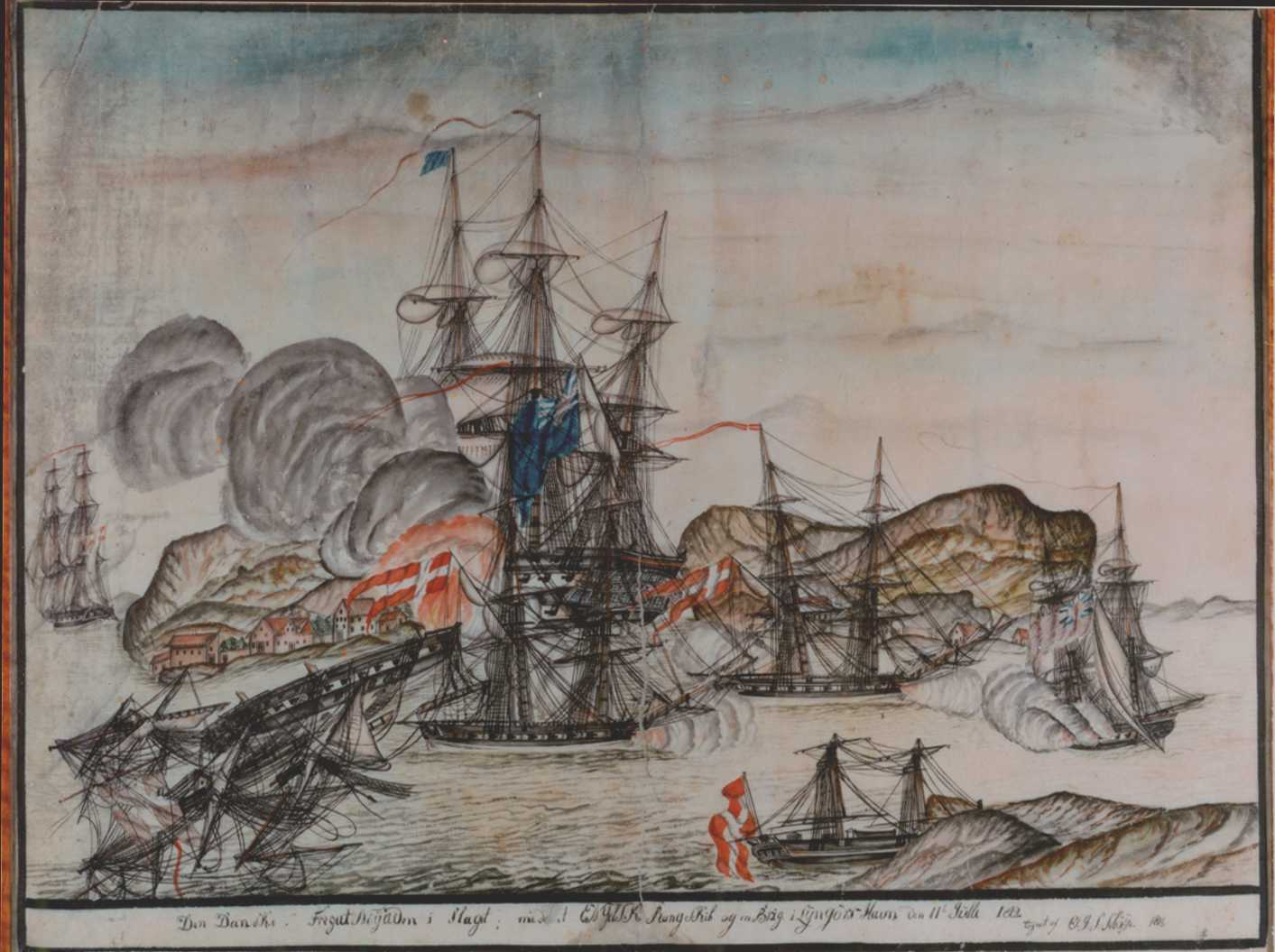
The Battle of Lyngør

In 1812, during the Gunboat War, the British saw an opportunity to enforce the blockade and break the back of Dano-Norwegian seapower. They therefore sent a small squadron consisting of the 64-gun Third Rate ship-of-the-line Dictator (Captain James Patteson Stewart), and three brigs, the 18-gun Cruizer class brig-sloop Calypso (Commander Weir), Podargus, and the 14-gun gun-brig Flamer (Lieutenant Thomas England), to seek out the Danes. On 6 July 1812, the squadron was off the island of Merdø on the coast of Norway, when the squadron sighted and chased a Danish squadron.

Robilliard and Podargus led the British attack because she had a man onboard who had sailed in those waters some time ago; nevertheless, she grounded. During the subsequent Battle of Lyngør Flamer stayed with her to protect her. However, Dictator and Calypso succeeded in destroying the new, 40-gun frigate HDMS Najaden and badly damaging the 18-gun brigs Laaland, Samsøe, and Kiel, as well as a number of gunboats. The British captured and tried to take out Laaland and Kiel but abandoned them when they grounded. The British did not set fire to either as the Norwegian vessels still had their crews and wounded aboard.

The action cost Dictator five killed and 24 wounded, Calypso three killed, one wounded and two missing, Podargus nine wounded, and Flamer one killed and one wounded. Najaden lost 133 dead and 82 wounded and the Danes acknowledged losing some 300 men killed and wounded overall.

Commander Weir received immediate promotion to post-captain; Robilliard received his promotion on 14 December; Dictator's first lieutenant, William Buchanan, received promotion to commander. In 1847 the surviving British participants were authorized to apply for the clasp "Off Mardoe 6 July 1812" to the Naval General Service Medal.

Several days later the British sent the cutter Nimble to reconnoiter the situation. Nimble reported seeing four vessels at Christiansand, two of 18 guns and two of 16 guns. Nimble also saw numerous gunboats about. The Battle of Lyngør effectively ended the Gunboat War.

Commander George Rennie replaced Robilliard in January 1813. Podargus then served under Viscount Keith in the Channel and in the Royal Navy's Bordeaux operations.

On 21 March 1814, Rear-admiral Penrose, in the 74-gun Egmont, anchored in the Gironde with a squadron that included Podargus. On 2 April the boats of Porcupine captured one gun-brig, six gun-boats, one armed schooner, three chasse-marées, and an imperial barge. They burned one gun-brig, two gun-boats, and one chasse-marée. The squadron shared the subsequent prize money. (Note: A first-class share was worth £54 18s 10d; a sixth-class share was worth 13s 7d.) Two days later, the 74-gun Centaur joined Egmont to prepare for to attack the French 74-gun Régulus, three brig-corvettes, other vessels lying near her, and the batteries that protected them. Before the British could launch their attack, the French burnt Régulus and the other vessels. (Note: A first-class share of the proceeds and head money was worth £69 6s 4 3/4d; a sixth-class share was worth 14s 5 3/4d.)

Between June and August 1814, Podargus was under the temporary command of Commander Houston Stewart. Commander James Wallis then recommissioned her. (Note: Wallis had been aboard Vincejo when the French captured her in 1804. He spent almost ten years in captivity before escaping from Verdun in 1813. The captain of Vincejo had died in captivity in 1804 under suspicious circumstances.)

On 9 July 1815, Podargus captured the French vessel Deux Amis.

== Post-war ==
Wallis sailed Podargus to St. Helena. Napoleon Bonaparte, though denying any involvement in Captain Wright's death, apparently was quite angry at Wallis being appointed to St Helena, viewing the appointment as a deliberate British provocation.

In April 1817, the transport brig Emu, belonging to the Cape Town Dockyard, was the first European vessel to enter the Knysna. She struck a rock, now known as Emu Rock, and was holed. Her crew ran Emu ashore to prevent her sinking. In late April Podargus arrived to render assistance. After surveying the area, Wallis sailed Podargus into the Knysna and retrieved Emu's cargo.

Commander Henry John Rous recommissioned Podargus at St Helena in November 1817.

In January 1819, while Podargus was still at St Helena, the London Gazette reported that Parliament had voted a grant to all those who had served under the command of Admiral Viscount Keith in 1812, between 1812 and 1814, and in the Gironde. Podargus was listed among the vessels that had served under Keith in 1813 and 1814. (Note: The money was paid in three tranches. For someone participating in the first through third tranches, a first-class share was worth £256 5s 9d; a sixth-class share was worth £4 6s 10d. For someone participating only in the second and third tranches a first-class share was worth £202 6s 8d; a sixth-class share was worth £5 0s 5d.) She had also served under Kieth in the Gironde. (Note: The sum of the two tranches of payment for that service was £272 8s 5d for a first-class share; the amount for a sixth-class share was £3 3s 5d.)

Lieutenant James Webb Cairnes was appointed to replace Rous in 1818, however, he did not take command until 1819. Cairnes had been first lieutenant of Conqueror. Rous was still in command of Podargus when he wrote a letter on 29 March 1819 to Admiral Robert Plampin, extolling the virtues of Hout Bay, 14 miles from Cape Town, as the site of a dockyard.

== Fate ==
By 1820 Podargus was back in Britain and laid up in ordinary at Portsmouth. The Admiralty offered her for sale on 7 August 1833, still at Portsmouth. She was sold on that day to Mr. John Small Sedger, Rotherhithe, for £510 for breaking up.
