= HMS Belette (1806) =

Brig-sloop of the Royal Navy

- Belette

History

United Kingdom
- Name: HMS Belette
- Ordered: 16 July 1803
- Builder: John King of Dover
- Launched: 21 March 1806
- Commissioned: April 1806
- Honours and awards: Naval General Service Medal with clasps: "Martinique"; "Guadaloupe"
- Fate: Wrecked 24 November 1812

General characteristics
- Type: Cruizer-class brig-sloop
- Tons burthen: 38426/94 (bm)
- Length: 100 ft 0 in (30.5 m) (gundeck); 77 ft 2 7/8 in (23.5 m) (keel)
- Beam: 30 ft 7 in (9.3 m)
- Depth of hold: 12 ft 9 in (3.9 m)
- Sail plan: Brig rigged
- Complement: 121
- Armament: 16 × 32-pounder carronades + 2 × 6-pounder bow guns

HMS Belette (or Bellette) was an 18-gun Cruizer-class brig-sloop, built by King at Dover and launched on 21 March 1806. During the Napoleonic Wars she served with some success in the Baltic and the Caribbean. Belette was lost in the Kattegat in 1812 when she hit a rock off Læsø.

== Baltic ==
Belette was commissioned in April 1806 under Commander Richard Piercy for the North Sea. Commander John Phillimore took command in September and sailed Belette in the English Channel and the Downs, taking part in Commodore Edward Owen's attack on Boulogne.

Belette was occupied in early 1807 with conveying supplies to the besieged town of Kolberg. In June 1807 Belette was off Suffolk when she tried to land a M. Bedezee, a Prussian envoy carrying some important despatches. The boat overturned a few hundred meters off shore and Bedezee drowned, as did a midshipman and three crewmen. A master's mate and a crewman were saved, but the despatches were lost.

Next, she was attached to Admiral James Gambier's fleet which returned to the Baltic to attack Copenhagen again in 1807. Phillimore distinguished himself during the battle, particularly in an engagement at the end of August, when Belette became becalmed off the Danish coast. Sixteen Danish gunboats attacked Belette, which sank three of them before boats from other British ships arrived and towed her clear. Gambier rewarded Phillimore for his courage by giving him the honour of carrying Gambier's despatches to the Admiralty. As a result, Phillimore received a promotion to post-captain on 13 October; however he remained with Belette.

The expedition to Copenhagen resulted in prize money for Bellette both for warships and merchant vessels. Belette was one of seven British warships sharing in the proceeds of the capture on 28 August of the Danish merchant vessel Sally. Then Belette is listed among the vessels sharing in the prize money for the ships and provisions that the British captured at Copenhagen. (Note: The prize money for an ordinary seaman was £3 8s 0d.) Bellette also shared with Gallant and a number of other warships in the captures of several merchant vessels: the Aurora (30 August), Paulina (30 August), Ceres (31 August), Odiford (4 September), and Benedicta (12 September). On 19 November Belette, with the gun-vessels Tigress and Safeguard in company, recaptured the ship Lively.

Belette brought the British ambassador, Lord Hutchinson back to Britain in February 1808. While sailing to Gothenburg she encountered a Danish Navy two-decker, but was able to escape by sailing into shallower waters.

== Caribbean ==
In February 1808 command passed to George Sanders who sailed her on the North Sea station. (Note: Sanders had commanded HMS Falcon in the Baltic the previous year. He then took her to the Leeward Islands, sailing on 3 May 1808.)

Belette captured a privateer on 2 July after a pursuit of 12 hours that ended some 70 miles SE of Barbados. The privateer was Jalouse, which was armed with four 12-pounder guns and had a crew of 75 men. Sanders described her as sailing remarkably fast and as having done "much Mischief to the Trade." Before running afoul of Belette, Jalouse had captured Mary and Lark, both of Halifax, and General Green, of Surinam, which last some other British warship had since recaptured. (Note: A first-class share of the prize money was worth £36 3s 11d; a sixth-class share, that of an ordinary seaman, was worth 15s 6 3/4d.)

Around this time Belette captured the privateer Franchise, of nine guns and 70 men. Belette captured Franchise windward of Barbados and carried her into Barbados.

In August Belette captured the French privateer Joséphine, which the Royal Navy took into service as Morne Fortunee. In British service she was armed with eight 18-pounder carronades and two 6-pounder guns, and had a crew of 55 men. (Note: Some accounts give the privateer's name as Morne Fortunee, and report that she originally carried 14 guns.)

Admiral Lord Collingwood received intelligence that the French corvette Rapide was on her way from Bayonne with dispatches and he asked Admiral Lord Alexander Cochrane to attempt to intercept her. On 8 August Belette captured Rapide, of one gun and 22 men, and took her into Barbados. However, Rapide's captain had managed to throw the dispatches overboard before Belette captured her. (Note: A first-class share of the prize money was worth £13 9s 0d; a sixth-class share was worth 5s 6 3/4d.) On 23 July duplicates of the dispatches and much besides were found concealed aboard the cartel Phoenix, which had sailed from Cayenne and had stopped in Barbados. She had aroused suspicion, leading Cochrane to having her searched. Because carrying these documents was a violation of the cartel (truce) flag, the British seized Phoenix and sent the seized documents in Subtle.

On 23 August Belette captured the French privateer schooner Confiance, of seven guns (though pierced for 16) and 70 men. She was three days out from Cayenne. (Note: A first-class share of the prize money was worth £38 7s 6 3/4d; a sixth-class share was worth 15s 10 1/2d.) The Royal Navy took Confiance into service as Skipjack.

On 5 December 1808 Belette captured the French letter of marque brig Revanche, of six 12-pounder guns and 44 men. Revanche was taking provisions from Bordeaux to Guadeloupe when she encountered Belette. Sanders described her as having been "a very successful Privateer all this War, and was intended for a Cruizer in those Seas." Belette sent Revanche into Antigua.

In February 1809, Belette participated in the combined naval and military assault and capture of the French-held island of Martinique. This qualified those of her crew still alive in 1847 for the Naval General Service Medal (NGSM) with clasp "Martinique". Belette was among the 42 warships that shared in the proceeds for the capture of Martinique. She then participated in the capture of Guadeloupe (January – February 1810), which earned for her crew the clasp "Guadaloupe" to the NGSM, as well as further prize money, which she shared with 49 other vessels. (Note: A first-class share of the prize money was worth £113 9s 1 3/4d; a sixth-class share, was worth £1 9s 5 1/2d.) Sanders received promotion to post-captain on 2 June 1809.The medal data indicates that David Sloane took command after Martinique and before Guadeloupe. He may, in fact, have sailed her back to the Leeward Islands from Britain.

== North Sea & Baltic ==
In 1811 Sloane took Belette back to home waters. Danish records suggest that by the summer of 1811 she was already in the North Sea.

Belette shared with Rose, Mercurius, and Reynard the proceeds for the capture on 18 December 1811 of Axel Thomsen and Cecelia Margaretha (or Sicillia Margaretha).

Unknown to the British, Danish Captain Hans Peter Holm had returned to Egersund (SW Norway) with Lolland and four other brigs. On 1 May 1811, the British sent four boats from Belette, Cherokee and Clio, into the western end of the sound, expecting to capture some shipping or do other mischief. The circumstances of locality and wind did not permit the Danish brigs to enter the sound from the further end, but Holm sent the Danish ships' boats under Lieutenant Niels Gerhardt Langemach up the sound to oppose the British. Some of the Danes landed to set an ambush from the cliff tops; the armed boats were hidden behind a skerry. As the British rowed boldly in, they met unexpected fire from howitzers and muskets; they immediately withdrew, with the Danish boats in pursuit. The Danes captured one of the British boats and her crew of an officer and 17 men, who had come from Belette. The Danes would have captured more but for the confusion that an explosion of a powder keg on one of the Danish boats caused. The confusion enabled the remaining British boats to reach the protection of their squadron.

By 1812 Belette was in the Baltic. On 24 May, Belette and Helder captured the Danish sloop St. Jorgen.

After the outbreak of the War of 1812, the British navy seized a number of American ships in British ports or that had otherwise not received the news. Belette was among the vessels sharing in the capture, on 12 August, of the Cuba, Caliban, Edward, Galen, Halcyon, and Cygnet. (Note: A first-class share was worth £360 2s 3d; a sixth-class share was worth £3 11s 7d.)

On 30 October, Belette was protecting the rear of a convoy when her acting master, Mr. James Turnbull, took her yawl and off Romsø captured a Danish rowboat armed with two 2-pounder guns and small arms. The Danes put up a short but spirited resistance before surrendering. Five men of the Danish crew of a lieutenant and 15 men were severely wounded. (Note: The letter in the London Gazette gave the name of Belette's captain as Swan. This is probably a mistake, or Swan was temporary.)

== Loss ==
On 24 November 1812 Belette, under Sloane, was in the Kattegat leading Russian ships through the south-west passage of Anholt towards Gothenburg when she went aground on a sunken rock called "John" (or "Fannot") off Læsø. She filled with water and broke in two. The shoals were shallow enough that her rigging remained above water. Her crew took to the rigging but during the night many died of exposure or fell into the sea when they lost their grip. Only six of her entire crew of 120 or so men and boys escaped death from exposure or drowning.
