= HMS Persian (1809) =

Brig-sloop of the Royal Navy

- Persian

History

United Kingdom
- Name: HMS Persian
- Builder: Daniel List, Cowes
- Launched: 1809
- Fate: Wrecked, 26 June 1813

General characteristics
- Class & type: Cruizer-class brig-sloop
- Tons burthen: 38851/94 bm
- Length: 100 ft 2 in (30.5 m) o/a; 78 ft 5 in (23.9 m) (keel)
- Beam: 30 ft 6 1/4 in (9.3 m)
- Depth of hold: 12 ft 9 in (3.9 m)
- Sail plan: Brig
- Complement: 121
- Armament: 16 × 32-pounder carronades; 2 × 6-pounder bow guns

HMS Persian was a Cruizer-class brig-sloop built by Daniel List and launched at Cowes in 1809. She captured two privateers before she wrecked in 1813.

== Career ==
She was commissioned under Commander Samuel Colquitt and spent her first year cruising in Channel. On 26 December 1809 she recaptured Thames. The next year, on 24 March, she sailed for the West Indies. Then on 1 October, she was in company with HMS Owen Glendower, when Owen Glendower captured Indomptable and recaptured Roden.

Colquitt received promotion to post captain on 21 October, the fifth anniversary of the Battle of Trafalgar. Her next captain was Commander Charles Bertram, who was appointed on 21 October.

On 5 April 1811, at 2pm, the signal station at Beachy Head signaled to Persian that a smuggling vessel was discharging her cargo nearby. Persian set out and after almost eight hours she saw a lugger heading for France. Persian fired two or three broadsides as she chased the lugger and an hour later the lugger struck. She was the privateer Ambuscade under the command of Nicholas Augustine Briganda and had been out from Dieppe for some 40 hours. She was armed with 14 guns and carried a crew of 36, though she normally carried 63 men. Persian sent Ambuscade into Portsmouth. (Note: Embuscade was a brand new ship when she was commissioned as a privateer in Dieppe in September 1808. She made two cruises with 89 to 100 men under the command of Antoine-Joseph Preira, aka "Balidar". She made a third cruise under a Captain Le Duc. Captain Rodrigues made two cruizes from August 1809 to February 1810. Her sixth and last cruise took place under the command of Captain Briganda from February 1811 to April 1811 when Persian captured her.)

On 13 February 1812 Persian, in company with Orestes, recaptured Arcadia. Arcadia, Smiley, master, had been sailing from Nova Scotia to the Clyde with a cargo of timber when the French 14-gun privateer Gozelle [sic] captured her. (Note: Gazelle was originally a 172-ton ("of load") merchant schooner from Saint-Malo built in 1808 for Blaise Fils. From October 1808 she sailed as a letter of marque. In October she sailed under the command of François-Jean Giron with 26 men and 4 guns; she sailed to Île de France and returned in January 1810. She underwent conversion to a brig in March. She then sailed under the command of Thomas Le Blanc with 22 men and 4 guns. She returned from Île de France in February 1811. she was recommissioned as a privateer in September 1811. She then cruised under the command of René Morin with 91 men and 14 guns.HMS Leonidas captured her off Saint-Malo on 16 February 1812. Captain A.J. Griffiths of Leonidas reported that Gazelle was armed with fourteen 9&12-pounder carronades and had been out 42 days from Saint-Malo.) After Persian recaptured Arcadia, Persian sent her into Dartmouth, where she arrived on 15 February in a very leaky state and with only the mate, of her original crew, aboard.

On 3 March 1812 Persian recaptured the American brig Hannah. Hannah, of New York, had sailed from Savannah, with a cargo of timber when a French privateer captured her. After recapturing Hannah, Persian then set out to try to find the privateer, but without success. The French privateer cutter had taken Hannah on 1 March, and Hannah arrived at Plymouth on 3 March, the same day that Persian had recaptured her.

On 27 March, Persian, based out of Jersey, sighted a lugger sailing west of her. Persian chased the lugger and fired several broadsides as she did so. After three hours the lugger struck and proved to be the French privateer Petit Jean. She had had to throw eight of her 16 guns overboard during a gale that also washed away eight of her crew of 56. She was under the command of François Clemence and had left her home port of Dieppe eight days before but had not captured any prizes. Persian sent Petit Jean into Guernsey, where she arrived the next day. (Note: Petit Jean was a lugger from Dieppe commissioned as a privateer in November 1811. She was on her first cruise when Persian captured her. She had a crew of 60 men.)

On 4 October HMS Podargus captured the Danish sloop Speculation and shared the prize money with Persian, Erebus, Woodlark, and Plover by agreement. Then on 17 October Persian and Erebus were again in company with Podargus when Podargus captured the Danish vessels Anna Maria, Twende Brodre, and two market-boats. Next month, on 11 November Podargus captured Syerstadt, with Persian and Erebus in company.

On 16 December Persian captured the Danish galliot Ebenetzer, with HMS Thracian in company. Erebus shared in the prize money by agreement with Persian.

== Loss ==
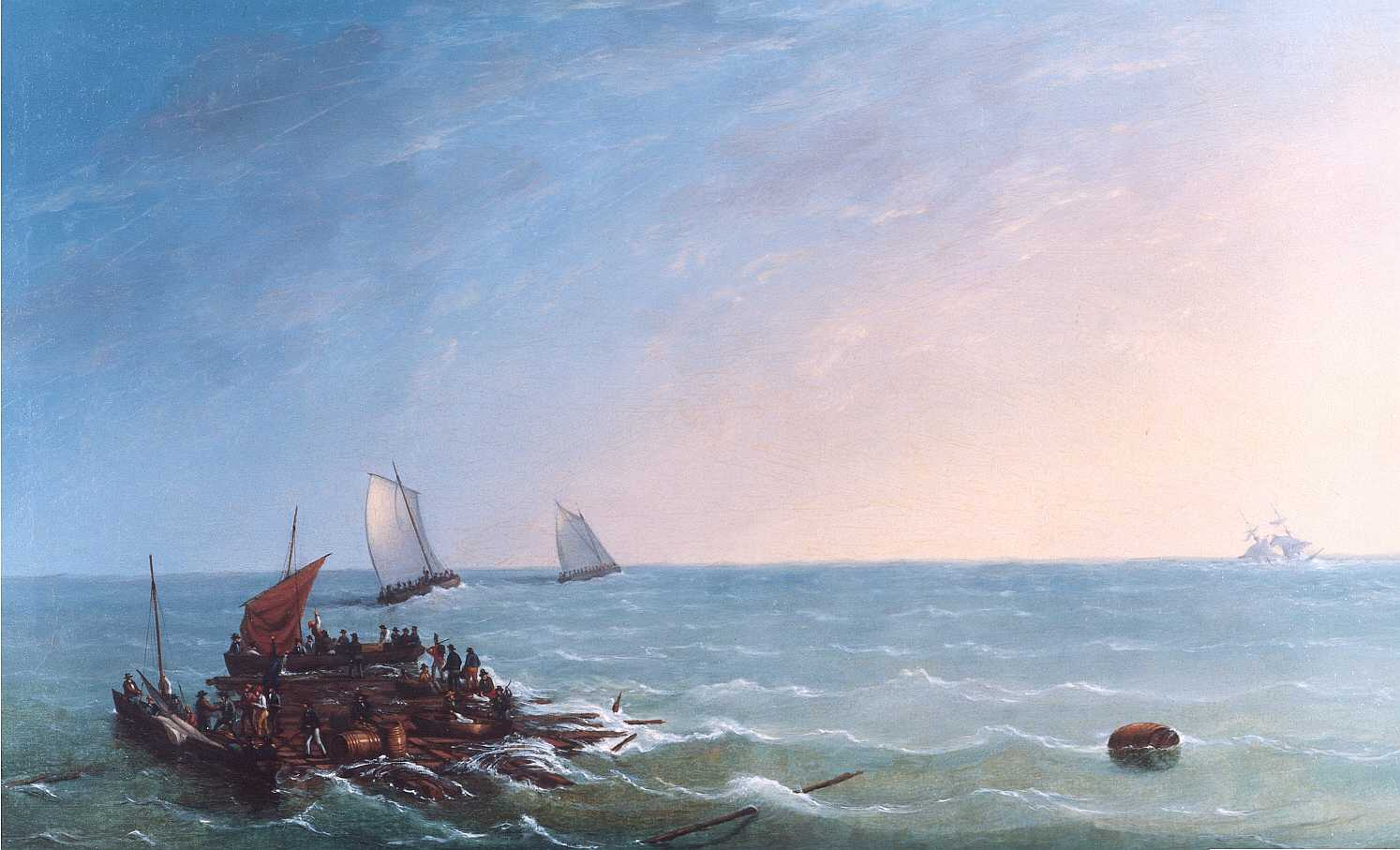
The Wreck of His Majesty's Sloop "Persian", Philip John Ouless, Jersey Heritage Trust

On 3 April 1813, Persian sailed for the West Indies, still under Bertram's command. On 16 June she was wrecked on the Silver Cays (or Keys) Bank, just north of the island of Hispaniola, after having set out from Port-au-Prince earlier that day. The Persian ran aground while pursuing the American privateer schooner Saucy Jack, captained by John P. Chazal out of Charleston, SC. Bertram tried to lighten Persian by throwing some guns and stores overboard with the result that she floated off, only to hit another reef. Eventually, despite the crew's exertions, she broke her back and foundered. On 27 June the crew crowded into her four boats (a makeshift raft broke apart) and on 28 June they came ashore between Cabo Frances (formerly called Cap Français) and Cabo Cabron in San Domingo. None of her crew of 126 men was lost. However, 11 seamen took advantage of the opportunity to desert the Navy.

Bertram and part of his crew arrived at Saint Thomas's on 23 July aboard the sloop Governor Hodgson, Darrell, master, which had been sailing from Porto Plate.

The court martial, under Captain Frederick Lewis Maitland, convened in Goliath at the Saints in October determined that the loss was the result of either a strong southerly current setting at a rate of 4 knots or that the Admiralty charts showed the shoals 20 miles too far to the south. The court praised the conduct of Bertram, his officers and his crew. Bertram received a promotion to post captain on 7 June 1814, but never served again.
