= Hans Peter Holm =

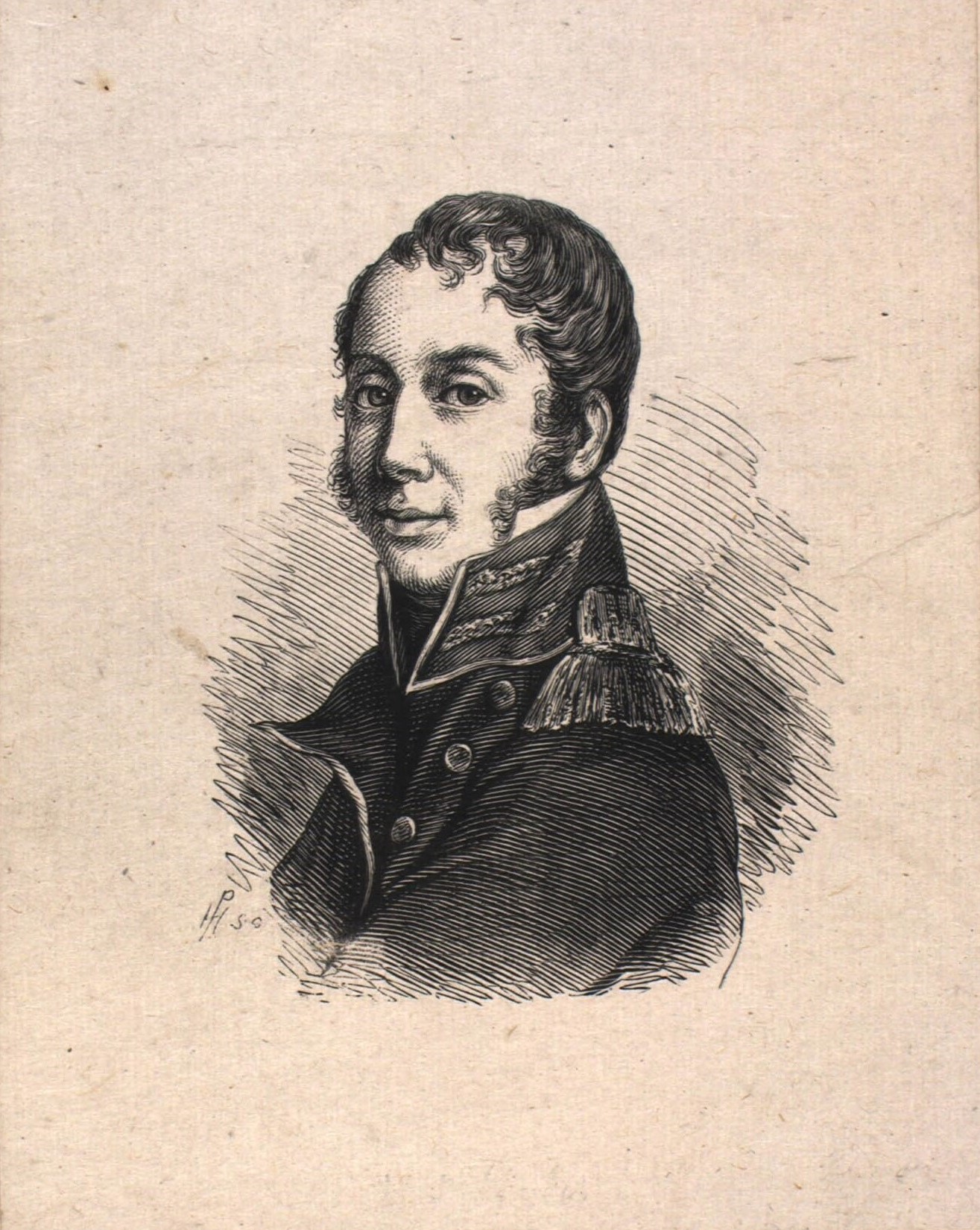
- Portrait of Holm
- Born: 17 June 1772; Søholm near Hillerød, Denmark
- Died: 26 October 1812 (aged 40); Langesundsfjord, Norway
- Burial place: Langesund, Norway
- Relatives: Peter Holm (father); Peter Christian Holm (son); Hans Peter Holm and Gustav Frederick Holm (grandsons)
- Military career
- Allegiance: Denmark–Norway
- Branch: Royal Dano-Norwegian Navy
- Service years: 1785–1812
- Rank: Captain
- Conflicts: Gunboat War; Battle of Lyngør; HMS Manly

Captain Hans Peter Holm (17 June 1772 – 26 October 1812) was a Royal Dano-Norwegian Navy officer who commanded several naval vessels during the Gunboat War. His most important action occurred in 1812 at the Battle of Lyngør when a British squadron, led by HMS Dictator, destroyed his vessel, HDMS Najaden. Holm sustained wounds in the battle but survived, only to drown in an accident shortly afterwards.

== Early life ==
Hans Peter Holm was born 17 June 1772 at Søholm, north of Copenhagen, to ship's master Peter Holm (1725–1786) and Christence Morslet (1744–1819). In 1807 he married Marie Heegaard (1791–1860), the daughter of a plantation owner in St Croix in the Danish West Indies. He died 26 October 1812 at Langesundsfjorden, Bamble, Telemark (SW of Oslo), and is buried in Langesund Church.

=== Naval career ===
At the age of 12, Holm accompanied his father, who was a ship's master in the Danish Asiatic Company, on a strenuous voyage to the East. Upon his return to Denmark in 1785 he enrolled as a cadet at the Naval Cadet Academy in Copenhagen, from which he graduated on 6 March 1789. As a junior lieutenant, he saw service in the Norske Løve, and in Havfruen with the home squadron. In 1793–94 he was serving on board the brig HDMS Lougen on its cruise to the Danish West Indies. After further spells in home waters on board HDMS Fredericksværn (then acting as a cadet training ship), and HDMS Cronborg, he was aboard HDMS Najaden in the Mediterranean under the leadership of Steen Andersen Bille during the Danish attack on Tripoli.

Holm received promotion to senior lieutenant on 3 November 1798. He then served as the recruiting officer at Arendal, southern Norway. Spells at sea followed, including serving on board HDMS Oldenburg on 15 November 1798 when a severe storm in Table Bay, South Africa, drove the vessel ashore. Holm served again in the Mediterranean in 1800–01 on the ship Sejeren.

=== Danish West Indies ===
Holm traveled to the Danish West Indies in 1802 to retake command of Lougen which had been surrendered to the British when they had occupied the islands in 1801. Lougen returned to Copenhagen on 7 September 1802. Almost immediately, Holm returned to the Danish West Indies for a period of some ten months, but was back in Denmark in June 1804. His next assignment was as a recruiting officer in Tønning, (Note: Tønning is now a German town in Schleswig-Holstein, with the German name of Tönning.) tasked with stopping foreign vessels hiring Danish seamen.

Soon, however, he was back in the Danish West Indies as chief pilot and harbour master on St Croix, which positions he retained during the British occupation of the island from December 1807, until the spring of 1809. During his time in the Danish West Indies, Holm was promoted to Commander (Kapt Lt) on 1 March 1805. He returned to Europe on an American brig in 1809. Holm then became second-in-command of the ship-of-the-line Pultusk, blockaded in the River Scheldt, until December 1810.

=== Norwegian service ===
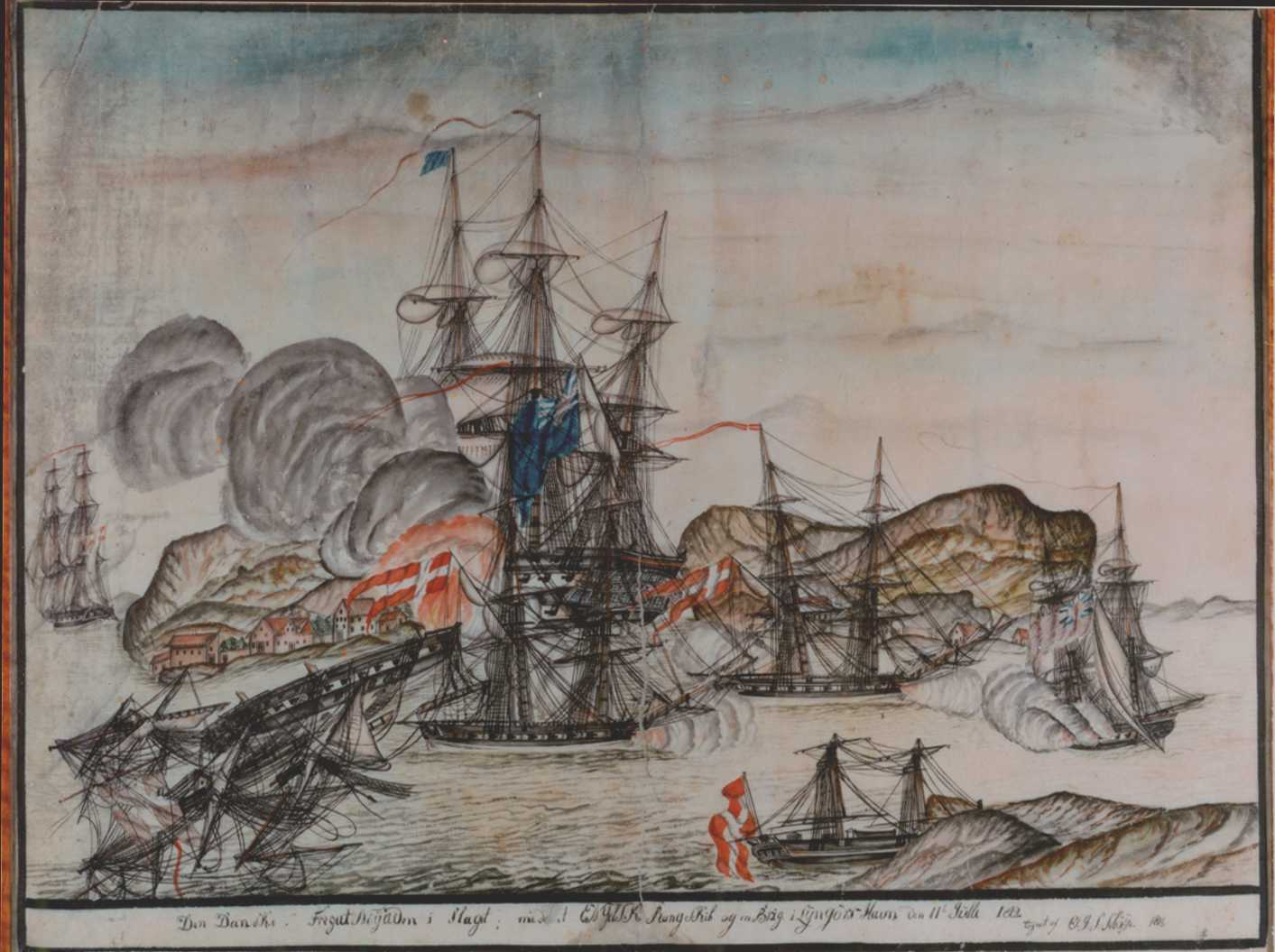
The Battle of Lyngør

After his promotion to full captain on 17 March 1811, Holm took command of the brig HDMS Lolland and was the senior officer of the squadron of similar warships stationed in Norway. In this position he planned and executed patrols along the western coast, which brought him recognition from King Frederick VI. On 1 May 1811 armed boats from Holm's squadron repelled a raid launched by boats from by three British warships off Egersund. The Danes were able to capture one of the raiding boats and her crew, which had come from HMS Belette.

On 3 August 1811 he was engaged in inconclusive engagement with the brig HMS Brev Drageren. While in command of Lolland, Holm captured the brig HMS Manly off Arendal on 2 September 1811. For his success, Holm was appointed captain of the newly built frigate HDMS Najaden in 1812, but difficulties encountered on her maiden voyage and in training up the new crew and coordinating her movements with the brigs meant that she was not fully combat ready until 1 June 1812.

On 2 July 1812 Holm took Najaden to sea from Stavern where some repairs were made so she could sail to Kristiansand, but contrary winds forced him to seek shelter in Sandoya. With a British ship-of-the-line hunting for him, he took Najaden into Lyngør harbour which was considered safe from larger warships, but this reckoning proved false and the Battle of Lyngør ensued on 6 July. The battle ended in a British victory and Najaden was sunk.

=== Death ===
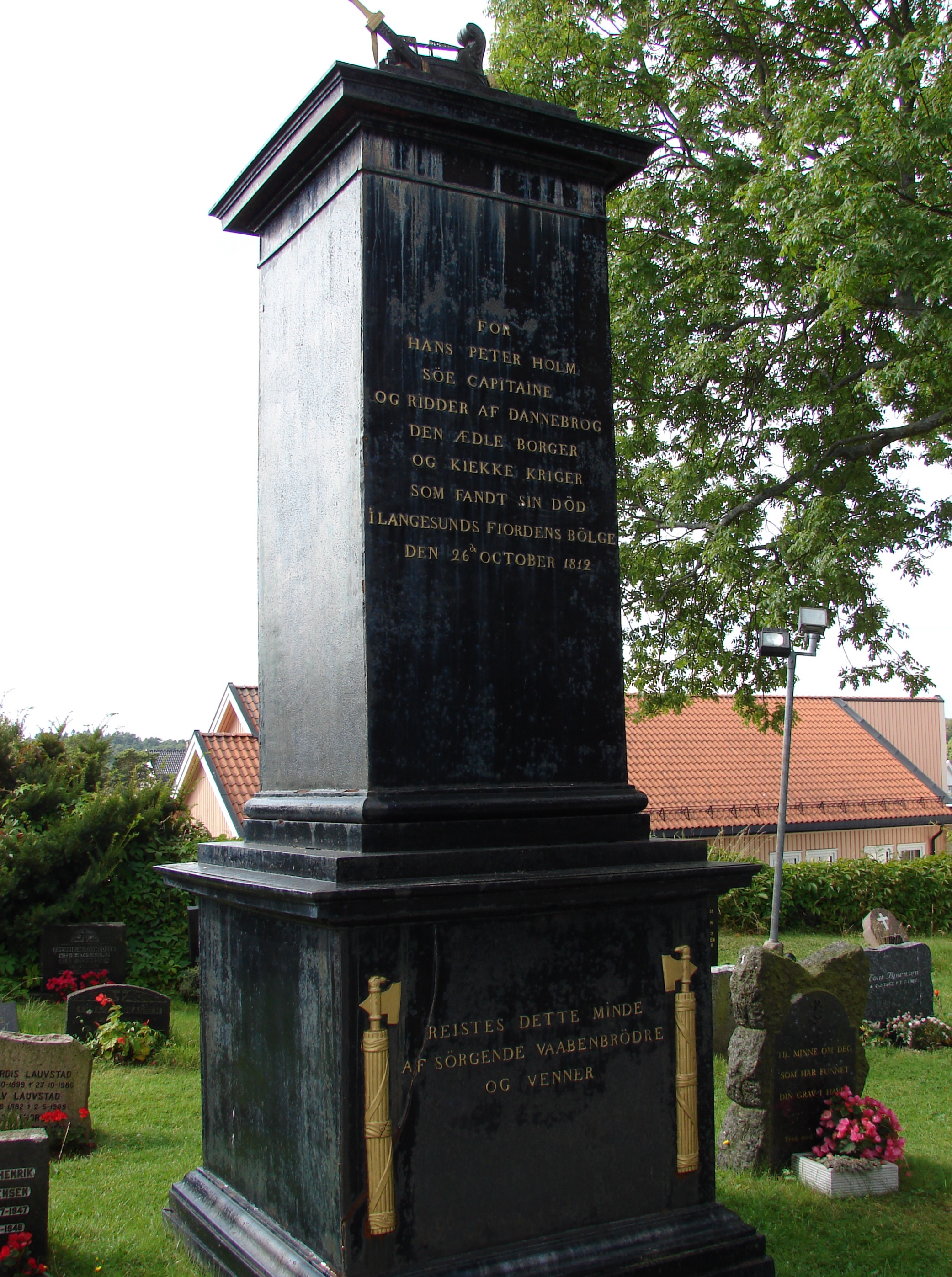
Memorial to Holm in Langesund Churchyard

Following the catastrophic loss of Najaden, Holm assumed command of a squadron of gunboats based in Sandøyasund. Orders to take over the command of a French ship-of-the-line, L'Albanais, were sent to him but never received as, on 26 October 1812, he was overcome in a storm in Langesundsfjord and drowned. A single iron column now stands to his memory in Langesund Churchyard, where he was buried with full military honours.

== Four generations ==
- Peter Holm Asiatic Company (Danish East India Company)
  - Hans Peter Holm (17 June 1772 to 26 October 1812). Son of Peter Holm and Christence Morslet (1744–1819). Married plantation owner's daughter Marie Heegaard (1791–1860).
    - Peter Christian Holm (25 December 1807 to 2 October 1864). Son of Hans Peter Holm. Commanded the frigate Jylland at the battle of Helgoland 9 May 1864. Buried and memorial at Holmens Kirke.
      - Hans Peter Holm (19 July 1847 to 28 January 1929). Son of Peter Christian Holm. Danish naval officer. Accomplished naval artist.
      - Gustav Frederick Holm (6 August 1849 to approx 1929). Son of Peter Christian Holm. Danish naval officer.

== Notes ==
Footnotes

== Bibliography ==
- Topsøe-Jensen, Theodor A.; Marquard, Emil (1935). Officerer i den dansk-norske Søetat 1660-1814 og den danske Søetat 1814-1932 [Officers of the Danish-Norwegian Naval Service]. Vol. I.
- Store Norske Leksikon, citing Norsk biografisk leksikon
