= HMS Dictator =

Ship of the line of the Royal Navy

- Plan showing the body plan, sheer lines with inboard detail, and longitudinal half-breadth for Dictator (1783). The plan may represent her as built in 1783.

History

Great Britain
- Name: HMS Dictator
- Ordered: 21 October 1778
- Builder: Batson, Limehouse
- Laid down: May 1780
- Launched: 6 January 1783
- Honours and awards: Naval General Service Medal with clasps: "Egypt"; "Off Mardoe 6 July 1812"
- Fate: Broken up in 1817

General characteristics
- Class & type: Inflexible-class ship of the line
- Tons burthen: 1379 (bm)
- Length: 159 ft (48 m) (gundeck)
- Beam: 44 ft 4 in (13.51 m)
- Depth of hold: 18 ft 10 in (5.74 m)
- Sail plan: Full-rigged ship
- Armament: Gundeck: 26 × 24-pounder guns; Upper gundeck: 26 × 18-pounder guns; QD: 10 × 4-pounder guns; Fc: 2 × 9-pounder guns

HMS Dictator was a 64-gun third-rate ship of the line of the Royal Navy, launched on 6 January 1783 at Limehouse. She was converted into a troopship in 1798, and broken up in 1817.

== French Revolutionary Wars ==
At the "Reduction of Trinidad" in 1797 Dictator participated in the later stages, not having arrived until 18 February, the prize money awarded reflecting this late arrival.

On 8 March 1801, whilst disembarking the army at the Battle of Aboukir during the French campaign in Egypt, one seaman was killed and a midshipman, Edward Robinson, fatally wounded.
Prize money for the capture of enemy ships was usually shared with other warships in the squadron between 1801 and 1806.

Because Dictator served in the navy's Egyptian campaign between 8 March 1801 and 2 September, her officers and crew qualified for the clasp "Egypt" to the Naval General Service Medal that the Admiralty issued in 1847 to all surviving claimants. (Note: A first-class share of the prize money awarded in April 1823 was worth £34 2s 4d; a fifth-class share, that of a seaman, was worth 3s 11½d. The amount was small as the total had to be shared between 79 vessels and the entire army contingent.)

== Napoleonic Wars ==
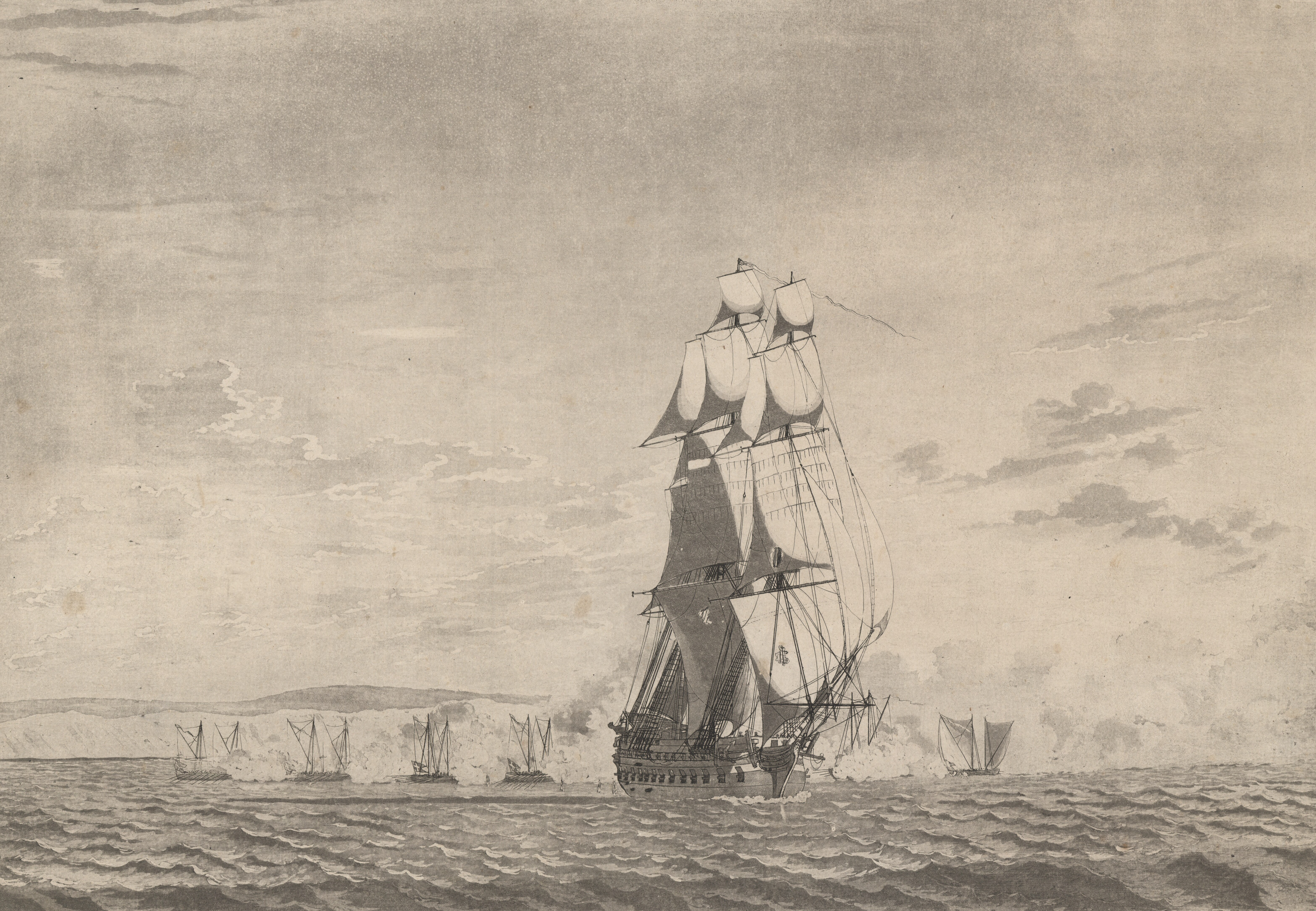
Six Danish gunboats attacking Dictator on 26 June 1808

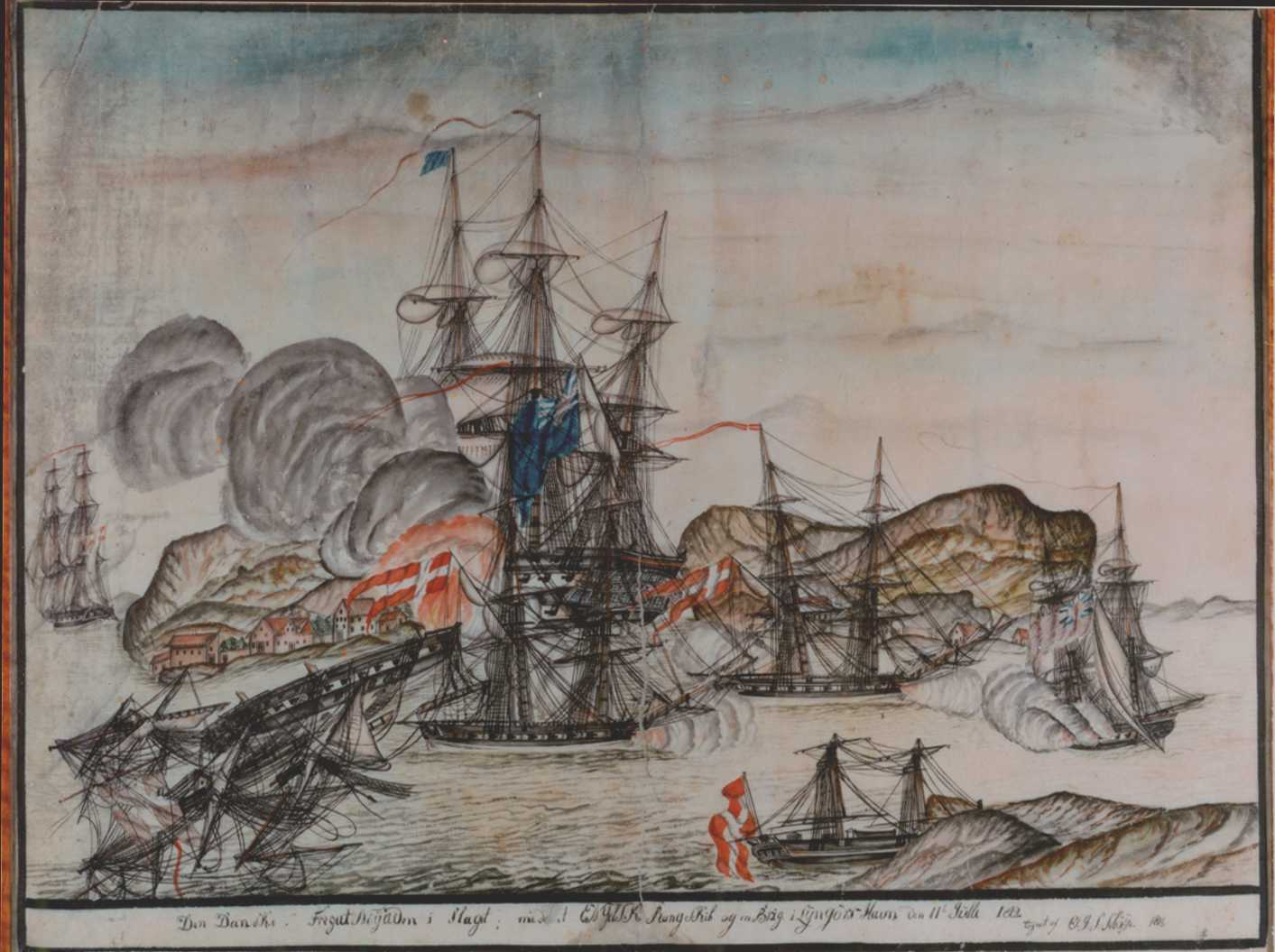
The Battle of Lyngør

In the late summer of 1807, Dictator was part of Admiral Gambier's fleet in the Øresund at the Battle of Copenhagen where she shared prize money with some 126 other British naval ships. She was again in Danish Waters the following year, in Admiral Hood's squadron of four ships-of-the-line together with some smaller vessels, tasked with maintaining the blockade between Jutland and Zealand. Her captain, Donald Campbell, ordered the sloop HMS Falcon to proceed on her successful patrols to Samsø, Tunø and Endelave.
In August 1809 Dictator was tasked with the occupation of the Pea Islands to the east of Bornholm but ran aground en route and had to be towed back to Karlskrona for repairs.

In early July 1810, during the Gunboat War with Denmark-Norway, Dictator, in company with Edgar and Alonzo, sighted three Danish gunboats commanded by Lieutenant Peter Nicolay Skibsted, who had captured Grinder in April of that year. The gunboats (Husaren, Løberen, and Flink) sought refuge in Grenå, on eastern Jutland, where a company of soldiers and their field guns could provide cover. However, the British mounted a cutting out expedition of some 200 men in ten ships' boats after midnight on 7 July, capturing the three gunboats. (Note: Skibsted spent a year as a prisoner of war in England. On his return to Denmark he underwent a court martial for the loss of his vessels and was found guilty.)

In 1812 Dictator led a small squadron consisting of three brigs, the 18-gun Cruizer-class brig-sloop Calypso, 14-gun brig-sloop Podargus and the 14-gun gun brig Flamer. On 7 July they encountered the Danish-Norwegian vessels Najaden, a frigate finished in 1811 in part with parts salvaged from a ship-of-the-line destroyed in earlier battles, and three brigs, Kiel, Lolland and Samsøe. Najaden was under the command of Danish naval officer Hans Peter Holm (1772–1812) In the subsequent Battle of Lyngør Dictator destroyed Najaden and the British took Laaland and Kiel as prizes but had to abandon them after the two vessels grounded. The action cost Dictator five killed and 24 wounded. In 1847 the surviving British participants were authorized to apply for the clasp "Off Mardoe 6 July 1812" to the Naval General Service Medal.

== War of 1812 ==
Under the rules of prize-money, the troopship Dictator shared in the proceeds of the capture of the American vessels in the Battle of Lake Borgne on 14 December 1814. (Note: 'Notice is hereby given to the officers and companies of His Majesty's ships Aetna, Alceste, Anaconda, Armide, Asia, Bedford, Belle Poule, Borer, Bucephalus, Calliope, Carron, Cydnus, Dictator, Diomede, Dover, Fox, Gorgon, Herald, Hydra, Meteor, Norge, Nymphe, Pigmy, Ramillies, Royal Oak, Seahorse, Shelburne, Sophie, Thames, Thistle, Tonnant, Trave, Volcano, and Weser, that they will be paid their respective proportions of prize money.') HMS Dictator was one of several troopships among Admiral Alexander Cochrane's fleet moored off New Orleans at the start of 1815.

The Dictator departed Bermuda on 23 April 1815. The Hydra and Dictator returned to Portsmouth on 12 May 1815.
