= HMS Woodlark (1808) =

Brig of the Royal Navy

History

United Kingdom
- Name: HMS Woodlark
- Namesake: Woodlark
- Ordered: 31 December 1807
- Builder: William Rowe, St Peter's Yard, Newcastle upon Tyne
- Laid down: March 1808
- Launched: 17 November 1808
- Commissioned: May 1809
- Fate: Sold

United Kingdom
- Name: Woodlark
- Acquired: 1818 by purchase
- Fate: Still sailing 1857

General characteristics
- Class & type: Cherokee-class brig-sloop
- Tons burthen: Originally: 23726/94, or 238 (bm); After 1838: 245, or 265, or 274 (bm)
- Length: Overall:90 ft 0 in (27.4 m); Keel:73 ft 6 3/4 in (22.4 m) (keel)
- Beam: 24 ft 7 1/2 in (7.5 m)
- Depth of hold: 10 ft 10 1/2 in (3.3 m)
- Propulsion: Sails
- Complement: 75
- Armament: 8 × 18-pounder carronades + 2 × 6-pounder bow chasers

HMS Woodlark was launched in 1808 and commissioned in 1809. The Royal Navy sold her in 1818. She then became a merchantman with her new owners retaining her name. From 1820/1821 she became a whaler, sailing out of Port Jackson. She was still sailing as late as the late 1850s.

== Royal Navy ==
Commander George E. Watts commissioned Woodlark at Spithead in May 1809 for the North Sea, and operated between 1810 and 1812 in the Baltic. On 27 November 1809 she captured the ship Percunas. On 15 January 1810 Zuneignen and Perkunas came into Hull. They had been sailing from Petersburg when Woodlark detained them.

About a year after being commissioned, on 20 May Woodlark captured Nicoline Elizabeth and Gode Haub. Nicolina Elizabeth and Good Hoop arrived at Hull on 6 June, as did Frow Inqueberg, a third prize to Woodlark. Three days later, on 23 May 1810, Woodlark recaptured Trende Sostre. On 27 May, Woodlark's boats destroyed the Danish privateer cutter Swan, which was lying under the protection of batteries and field pieces off Hadstrand (Højsande), Læsø. Swan was armed with eight 24-pounder carronades and had a crew of 35 men. Head money was paid on 9 February 1813.

On 23 June Woodlark recaptured the ship Success. Success, Zimmerman, master, had been sailing from Pillau when her captors brought her into Bornholm, where she was condemned and from whence Woodlark's boat cut her out. Success arrived at Hull on 27 July with all her cargo except for 26 lasts of wheat. On 29 January 1811 her officers and crew received £1000, representing a part-payment of the salvage money for her recapture.

On 2 July 1810 Woodlark captured the galiot Drei Gebruder. Four days later Woodlark detained the galliot St Neil. St Nil, Gotschalp, master, had been sailing from Petersburg when Woodlark captured her. St Nil arrived at Hull on 16 August,

Woodlark was in sight on 13 July when HMS Cruizer captured Jonge Johannes and on 15 July when Cruizer captured the hoy Elizabeth (or Jonge Elizabeth).

Several more captures followed. On 4 August Woodlark captured the galiot Anna Maria. Anna Maria, Halman, master, had been sailing from Petersburg. Her prize crew took her into Hull.

The detention of Zwey Geschwisters on 27 October resulted in prize money for her cargo of soap. Dorothea Louisa, Zirch, master, from Rostock and Die Schwester, Hakler, master, from Petersburg, arrived at Hull on 14 November.

Then on 17 April 1811 Woodlark captured the Danish brig Emilie and Louise, followed by the captures of Ebenetzer and Resolutionen on 7 May. Amelia Louisa, Hennie, master, had been sailing from Copenhagen when Woodlark detained her. Amelia Louisa arrived at Hull on 24 April. Ebenezer, from Olberg, arrived at Hull on 15 May. Resolution arrived at Hull on 16 May. On 17 May Anne Mare and Countess Ahlefreldto arrived at Hull. All were prizes to Woodlark.

Woodlark captured a Danish privateer, name unknown, on 23 May 1811. She also captured Warsam on 21 September, and the privateer Cylla on 24 December. The prize money for Warsam and the head money for the two privateers was paid on 9 February 1813.

On 30 April 1812, Woodlark captured Haabet.

Shortly after the outbreak of the War of 1812, on 12 August, Woodlark shared in the seizure of several American vessels: Cuba, Caliban, Edward, Galen, Halcyon, and Cygnet. (Note: Prize money was paid in November 1815. A first-class share was worth £360 2s 3d; a sixth-class share, that of an ordinary seaman, was worth £3 11s 7d.)

On 2 September Woodlark captured a Danish privateer of unknown name. (Note: A first-class share was worth £11 12s 1½d. A sixth-class share was worth 5s 3d. However, these shares were subject to some deductions for expenses connected with the condemnation of Haabet. The deductions for a first-class share were £9 13s 3d and for a sixth-class share 4s 4½d.)

On 4 October 1812, HMS Podargus captured the Danish sloop Speculation. Podargus shared the prize money with Woodlark, Erebus, Persian, and Plover by agreement. (Note: A first-class share was worth £5 15s 5d. A sixth-class share was worth 2s 4½d,)

In 1813 Commander George Anson Byron replaced Watts. In 1814 Commander Robert Balfour replaced Byron.

In June Commander William Cutfield assumed command.

On 25 February 1814 Lieutenant Cheyne and five seamen from Woodlark manned the first boat to be able to cross the bar at the Admiral Lord Keith's landing of troops at the Ardour river.

Woodlark left Plymouth on 6 March 1815, escorting a convoy from Plymouth to Bordeaux. The ketch Sophie, from the convoy, was run down off Plymouth.

Disposal: The "Principal Officers and Commissioners of His Majesty's Navy" offered the "Woodlark brig, of 237 tons," lying at Chatham, for sale on 30 January 1817. They finally succeeded in selling her a year later on 29 January 1818 for £700 to a Mr. Grant.

Post-scripts: In January 1819 the London Gazette reported that Parliament had voted a grant to all those who had served under the command of Admiral Viscount Keith in 1812, between 1812 and 1814, and in the Gironde. Woodlark was listed among the vessels that had served under Keith in 1813 and 1814. (Note: The money was paid in three tranches. For someone participating in the first through third tranches, a first-class share was worth £256 5s 9d; a sixth-class share was worth £4 6s 10d. For someone participating only in the second and third tranches a first-class share was worth £202 6s 8d; a sixth-class share was worth £5 0s 5d.)

In August 1822 the government announced that it would pay the balance of prize money due on sundry Danish vessels that Woodlark and Erebus had captured between 20 June 1813 and 24 July. However, the bankruptcy of the government's agent at Gothenburg had resulted in an amount too small to warrant a general disbursement. Instead, the government would turn the money for the subsidiary shares over to the Treasurer of the Greenwich Hospital, London, a home for retired Royal Navy sailors. (Note: A first-class share was worth £6 15s 7½d; a sixth-class share was worth 6d.)

== Merchantman and whaler ==
Woodlark first appeared in Lloyd's Register (LR) in 1818 with Middleton, master and owner, and trade London-Smyrna.

The table below has data from LR and the Register of Shipping (RS).

Year	Master	Owner	Trade	Source
1820	Middleton; Moore	Middleton	London–Malta	LR
1820	Middleton	Captain & Co.	London-Smyrna	RS
1821	Moore	Jones	London–New South Wales	RS

In March 1821, Woodlark, Moore, master, was at Bay of Islands, having killed two whales.

On 17 September 1821 Woodlark, Moore, master, sailed for New South Wales. On 18 May 1822, Woodlark, Moor, master, arrived at Sydney from the "fishery".

She apparently stayed at Port Jackson, sailing from there as a whaler. Thereafter both LR and RS carried what appears to have been stale data. LR did not reflect the transfer to New South Wales; RS caught that she had sailed to New South Wales, but not that she remained there.

Year	Master	Owner	Trade	Source & notes
1825	J.Moore	Middleton	London–Malta	LR
1825	Moore	Jones	London–New South Wales	RS
1829	J.Moore	Middleton	London–Malta	LR
1829	Moore	Jones	London–New South Wales	RS
1830	Moore	Jones	London–New South Wales	RS
1832	Moore	Jones	London–New South Wales	RS

Captain Joshua Moore sailed Woodlark from Port Jackson between 1820 and 1825. Captain Hodges sailed her in 1826, and Captain George Grimes in 1830 to 1832. Woodlark, Grimes, master, was reported to have been at Bay of Islands on 18 March 1830 with 1,100 barrels of whale oil. Cadmus, and a number of other whalers from London, Port Jackson, and the United States, were then also there. She was listed as belonging to Port Jackson in 1831, with Jones & Moore, owners, and as having taken 245 tons of whale oil in the 1831 whaling season to June 1831.

Captain Grimes continued to sail Woodlark on whaling voyages for a number of years after 1832.

Prior to November 1836 he reported the existence of an island that came to be known as Woodlark Island. He apparently had entered the discovery in Woodlark's log in 1832.

On 15 March 1837 Woodlark stopped at Walpole Island (New Caledonia), where Grimes discovered the skeletons of seven men. The skeletons were believed to be six or seven years old and some artefacts with them raised the possibility that skeletons may have been those of convicts that had escaped from Norfolk Island in a boat. Woodlark had been at sea for 15 months without dropping anchor. Mrs Grimes was aboard making this what was believed to be the longest voyage by a female on record. When Woodlark finally returned to Port Jackson after having been out 21 months, Grimes brought the skulls with him, which he handed over to the authorities.

In March–April 1838, after Woodlark had been at sea for some five months, she developed a leak. Grimes put in at Port Stephens where the leak was repaired. As she left, eight seamen demanded that she sail to Port Jackson and that they be discharged there. They stated that she was unseaworthy, that the repairs had not really solved the problem, and that they refused to perform their duties. Grimes had the mutinous seamen confined below deck and fed only bread and water. He sailed to Port Jackson where he had them charged.Woodlark went into dock to unload 350 barrels of oil and undergo further repairs.

On 11 March 1839 A fire in the Pacific Ocean (33°27′S 161°45′E) destroyed Despatch. All 29 people on board successfully abandoned ship, leaving in her jolly boat and longboat. The two boats separated and Governor Bourke rescued the eight people in the jolly boat. The other 21 people reached Lord Howe's Island in the long boat, where Woodlark, Grimes, master, rescued them. Grimes had earlier left a seaman at Howe's Island and had returned to retrieve him. All the survivors were brought to Newcastle, from where the steamer Tamar brought them to Sydney.

Woodlark continued to engage in whaling until on 3 September 1840 when her owners, Walker & Co., offered her for sale.

Woodlark, Abbot, master, Moore and Co., owners, then returned to whaling. Later, Smith became her master. Henry Moore died in 1844, insolvent. Woodlark and her cargo were auctioned on 10 March 1845. Woodlark was sold to Captain Hindson for £660. Woodlark continued to engage in whaling with Charles Smith, master.

In November 1845 Woodlark left nine men at Port Philip with the police. The nine sailors had refused to work after Smith had on 16 October refused to let them land on Treasury Island. When the case came to court the judge dismissed it.

In January 1851 Captain Sargeant replace Smith. Woodlark continued to engage in whaling. At around this time her owners became Flower, Salting, and Towns. By early 1857 her master was Captain Cook, though other masters may have sailed her before him but after Sargeant. In all, the vessel made 27 whaling voyages between 1820 and 1854.

Thereafter it is not clear how much longer she sailed.
