= HDMS Najaden (1811) =

Coordinates: 58.6333°N 9.1286°E

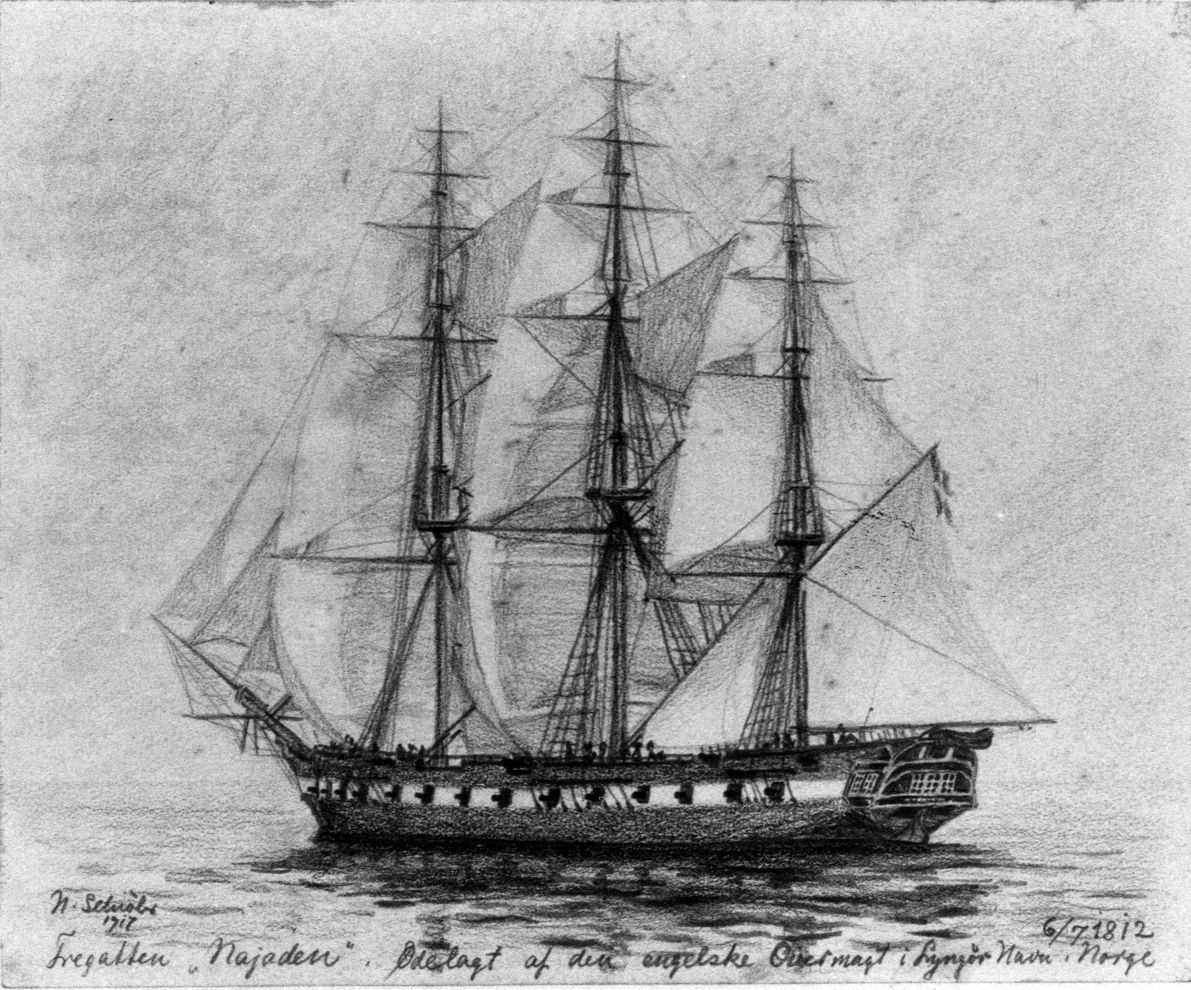

History

Denmark-Norway
- Builder: Hohlenberg at Nyholm, Copenhagen
- Laid down: August 1808
- Launched: 26 October 1811
- In service: 29 February 1812
- Fate: Destroyed in battle, 6 July 1812

General characteristics
- Class & type: Frigate
- Tons burthen: 1202
- Length: 143 ft 6 in (43.74 m)
- Beam: 36 ft 6 in (11.13 m)
- Draught: 15 ft 10 in (4.83 m) aft; 14 ft 10 in (4.52 m) fore
- Propulsion: sail
- Complement: 336 men
- Armament: 26 × 18-pounder guns + 6 × 18-pounder carronades + 4 × 6-pounder guns

HDMS Najaden was a frigate in the Royal Danish-Norwegian Navy. She was commissioned in 1811 and originally carried 36 guns, later being upgraded to 42. She served briefly during the Gunboat War only seeing action once, when on 6 July 1812 the British ship of the line HMS Dictator and the Cruizer-class brig-sloop HMS Calypso sank her during the Battle of Lyngør. The Battle of Lyngør effectively ended Denmark's involvement in the Napoleonic Wars.

== Origin ==
During their occupation of Copenhagen in 1807, British forces destroyed a partially built Dano-Norwegian ship of the line by hacking away the supports so that the ship fell on her port side, which crushed most of her timbers. The starboard side was essentially intact however, and the Dano-Norwegians used these timbers to build a new frigate – the Najaden. (Note: The name translates as "Water Nymph" - see mythology Naiad.)

== Career ==
During her entire short life, Najaden's captain was the Danish naval officer Hans Peter Holm. Her maiden voyage on 29 February 1812 (a leap year) had been delayed by one day because the ship grounded whilst leaving Copenhagen harbour. She then dragged an anchor on arrival in Brekkestø, Norway, which led to rudder damage on rocks, which further delayed her entry on active service. Still, on this short voyage the ship had achieved a good average speed of ten knots. Then yet more early storm damage curtailed training of the crew.

== Battle of Lyngør ==
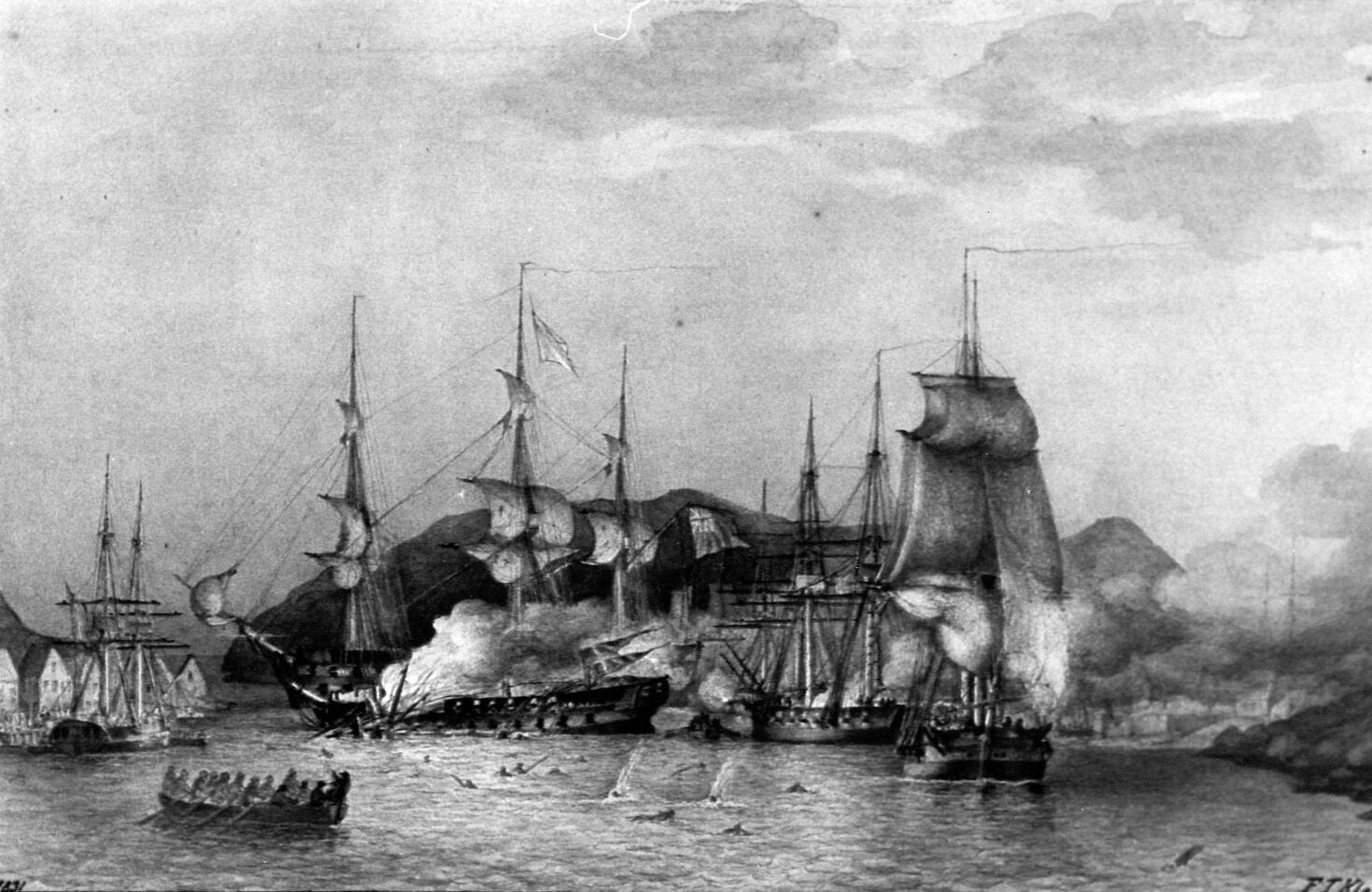
Najaden on fire with her mast broken in the Battle of Lyngør, 1812.

Najaden's captain, Hans Peter Holm, also commanded the squadron that consisted of the three brigs - Kiel, Lolland (or Laaland) and Samsøe. Eyeing an opportunity to enforce the blockade and break the back of Dano-Norwegian seapower, the British deployed the 64-gun third-rate ship-of-the-line Dictator and three brigs, the 18-gun Cruizer-class brig-sloop Calypso, 14-gun brig-sloop Podargus and the 14-gun gun-brig Flamer.

Within 45 minutes of the commencement of the action, Najaden had sunk, having suffered 133 dead and 82 wounded. Captain Holm survived, only to drown in an accident a few months later. The battle resumed as Norwegian gunboats found their way into Lyngør. At 2 a.m. on July 7, Dictator, which had grounded, pulled herself off and departed from the battleifeld. The British took Lolland and Kiel as prizes but had to abandon them after the two vessels grounded. The British did not set fire to either as they still had their crews and wounded aboard. The action cost Dictator five killed and 24 wounded, Calypso three killed, one wounded and two missing, and Flamer one killed and one wounded. Overall, the Danish recorded their losses as 300 men killed or wounded.
