= Lyngør =

Village in Tvedestrand Municipality, Norway

- Village
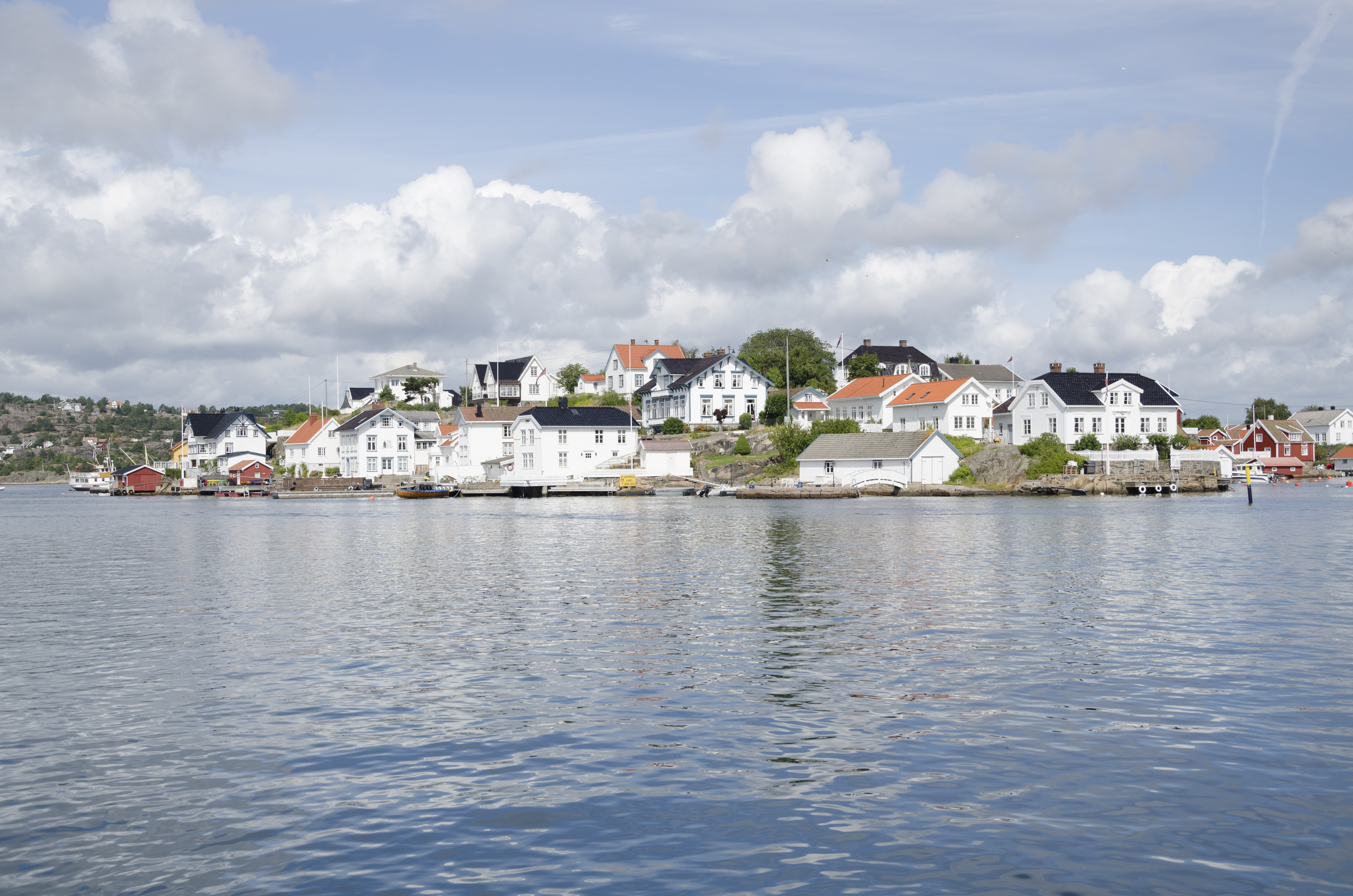
- View of the village
- Interactive map of Lyngør
- Coordinates: 58.6326°N 09.1297°E
- Country: Norway
- Region: Southern Norway
- County: Agder
- District: Østre Agder
- Municipality: Tvedestrand Municipality
- Elevation: 10 m (33 ft)
- Time zone: UTC+01:00 (CET)
  - Summer (DST): UTC+02:00 (CEST)
- Post Code: 4910 Lyngør

Lyngør is a village area on a group of small islands in Tvedestrand Municipality in Agder county, off the southeast coast of Norway. The village is about 12 kilometres (7.5 mi) northeast of Tvedestrand and approximately 12 kilometres (7.5 mi) southwest of the town of Risør. The village is located on several islands located very close together and separated by small straits that are less than 100 metres (330 ft) wide. The village is located on the islands of Holmen, Odden, Lyngøya, and Steinsøya. The Lyngør Lighthouse lies at the northeast edge of the village area.

== History ==
Previously, the village was a popular home for sea captains since it is only accessible by boat and it has no cars. The village is well-known for its scenic harbour and wooden houses. It is recognized as one of the best-preserved communities in Europe. Most of the buildings are now summer homes, but there are still about 75 permanent, year-round residents (in 2017). A popular destination in the summer months, it has more recently struggled to maintain a stable permanent population since it has no road connections to the mainland. The community has a sail-making factory, a few restaurants that are open during the tourist season, and a general store.

The strait that goes through Lyngør was the site of the Battle of Lyngør, which was fought on 6 July 1812 during the Gunboat War. In the battle, a Royal Navy squadron destroyed the frigate HDMS Najaden, whose wreck was discovered in the strait in 1957.

== Media gallery ==
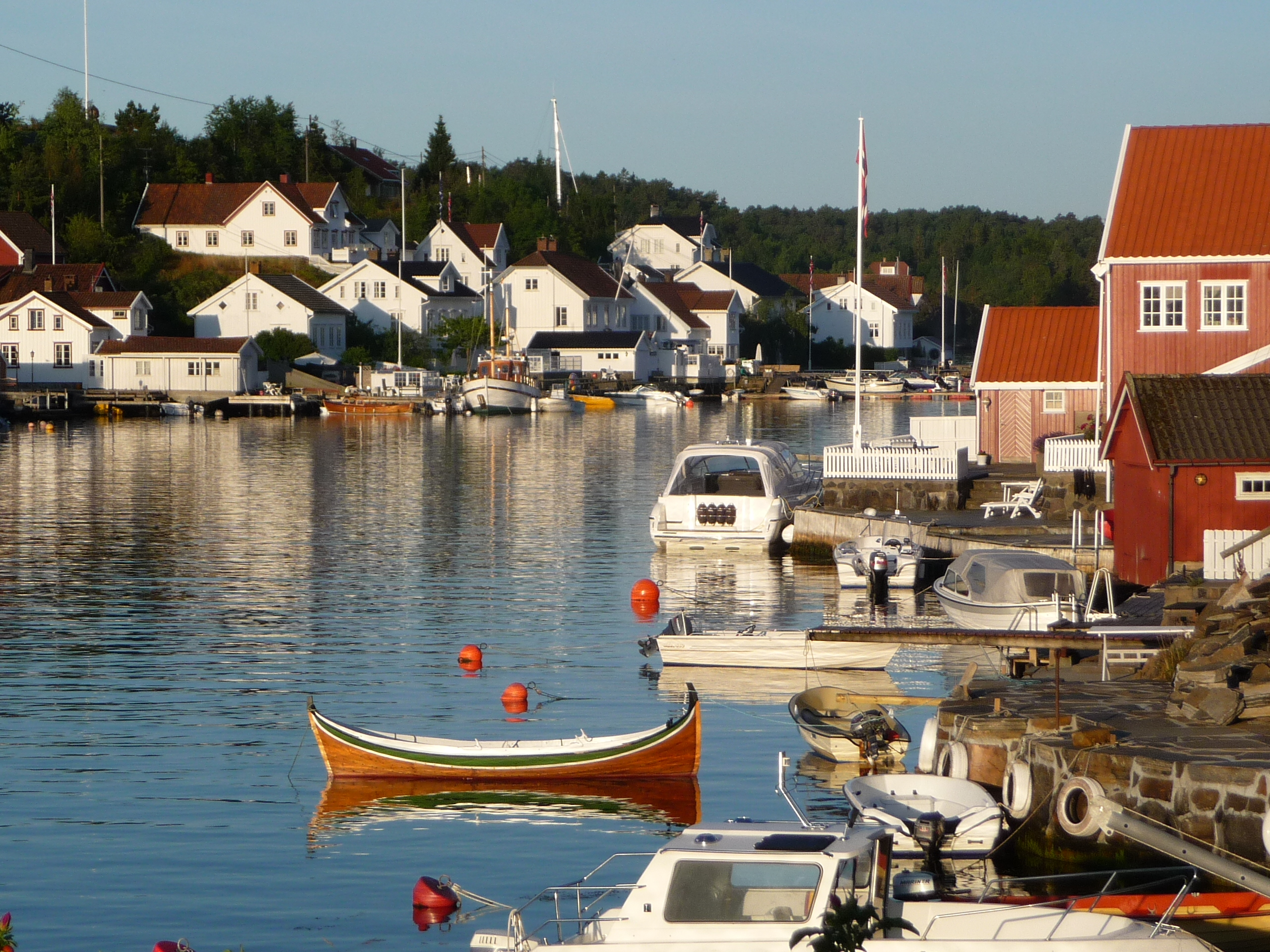

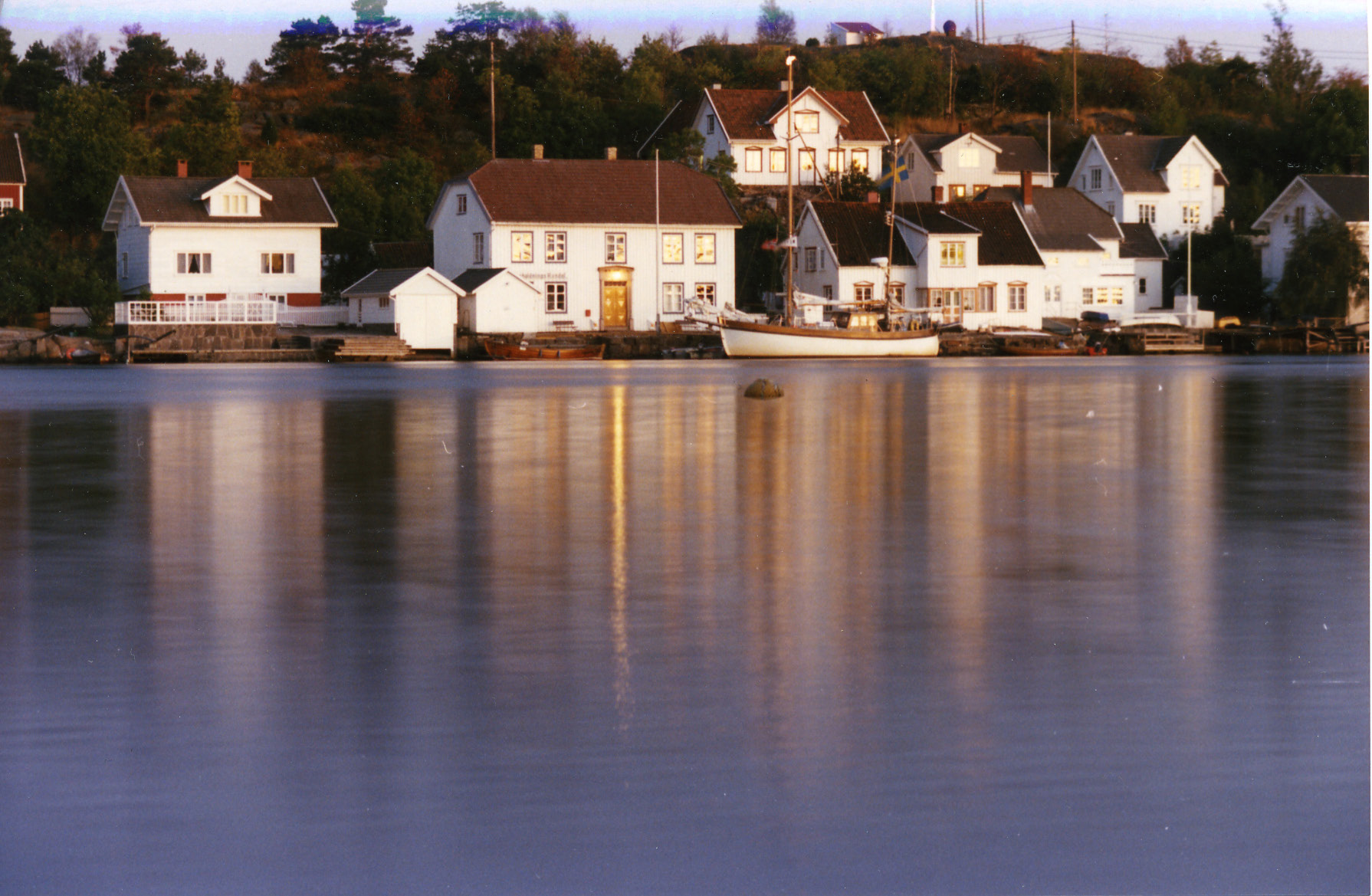

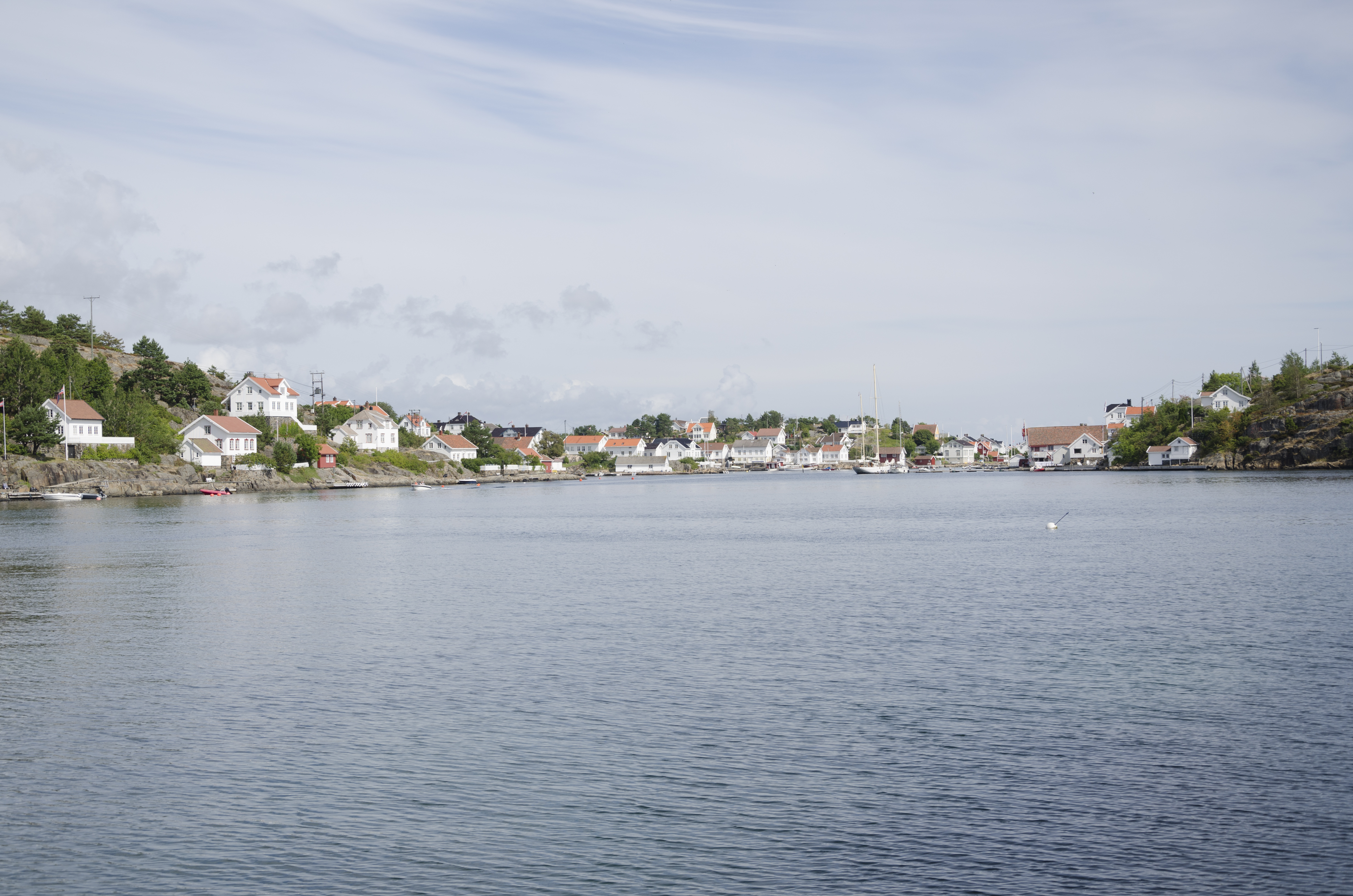

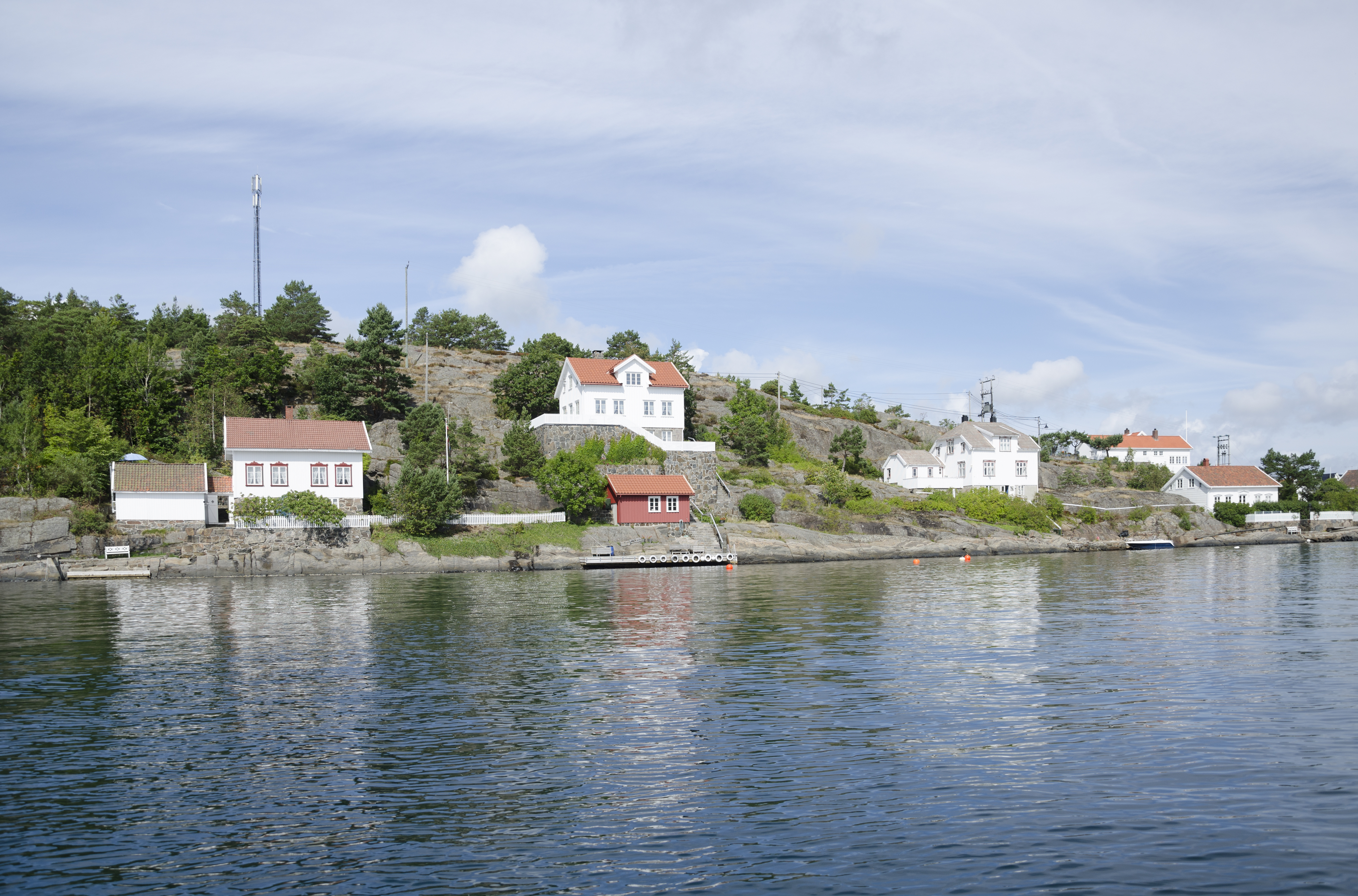

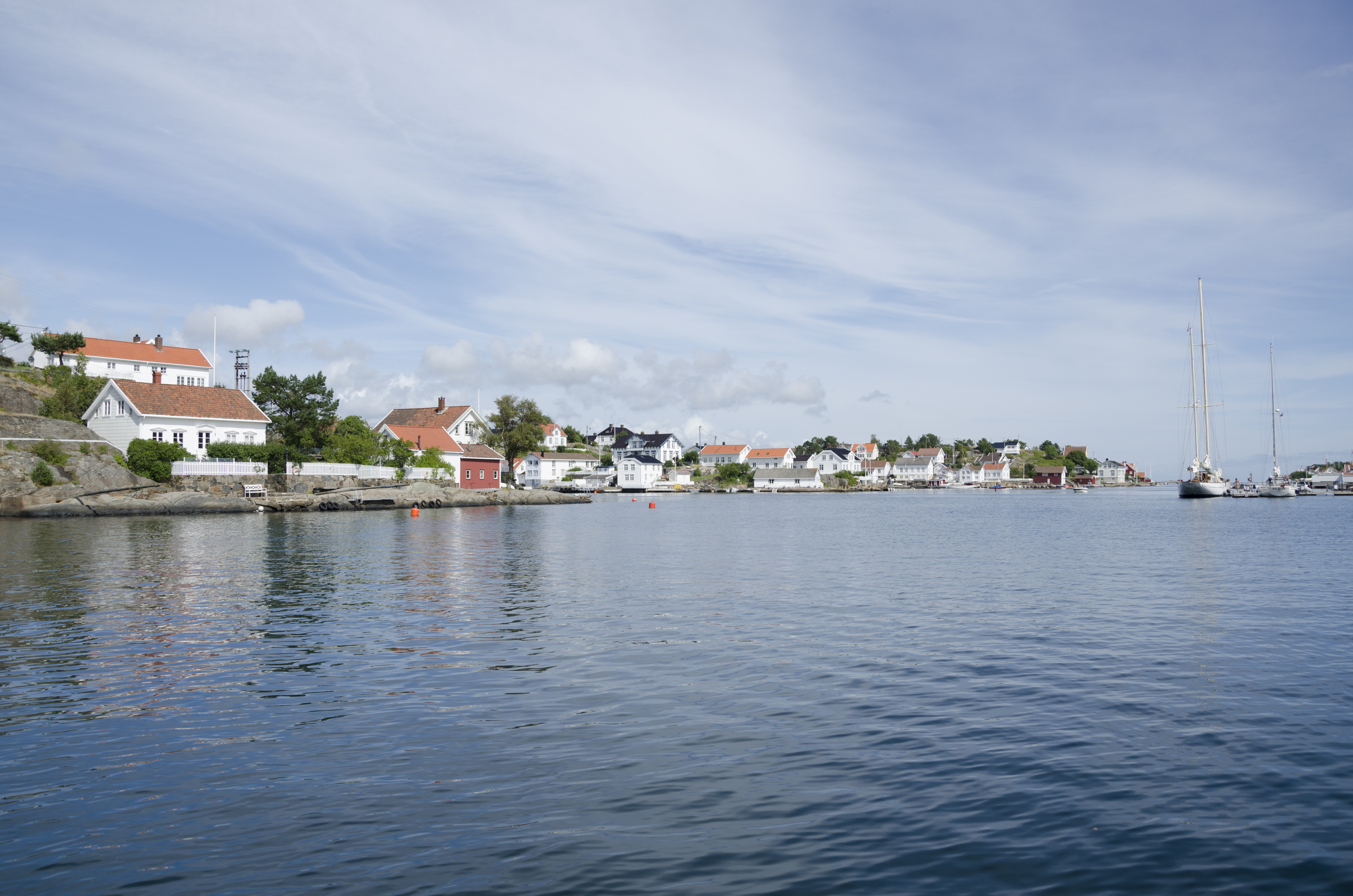

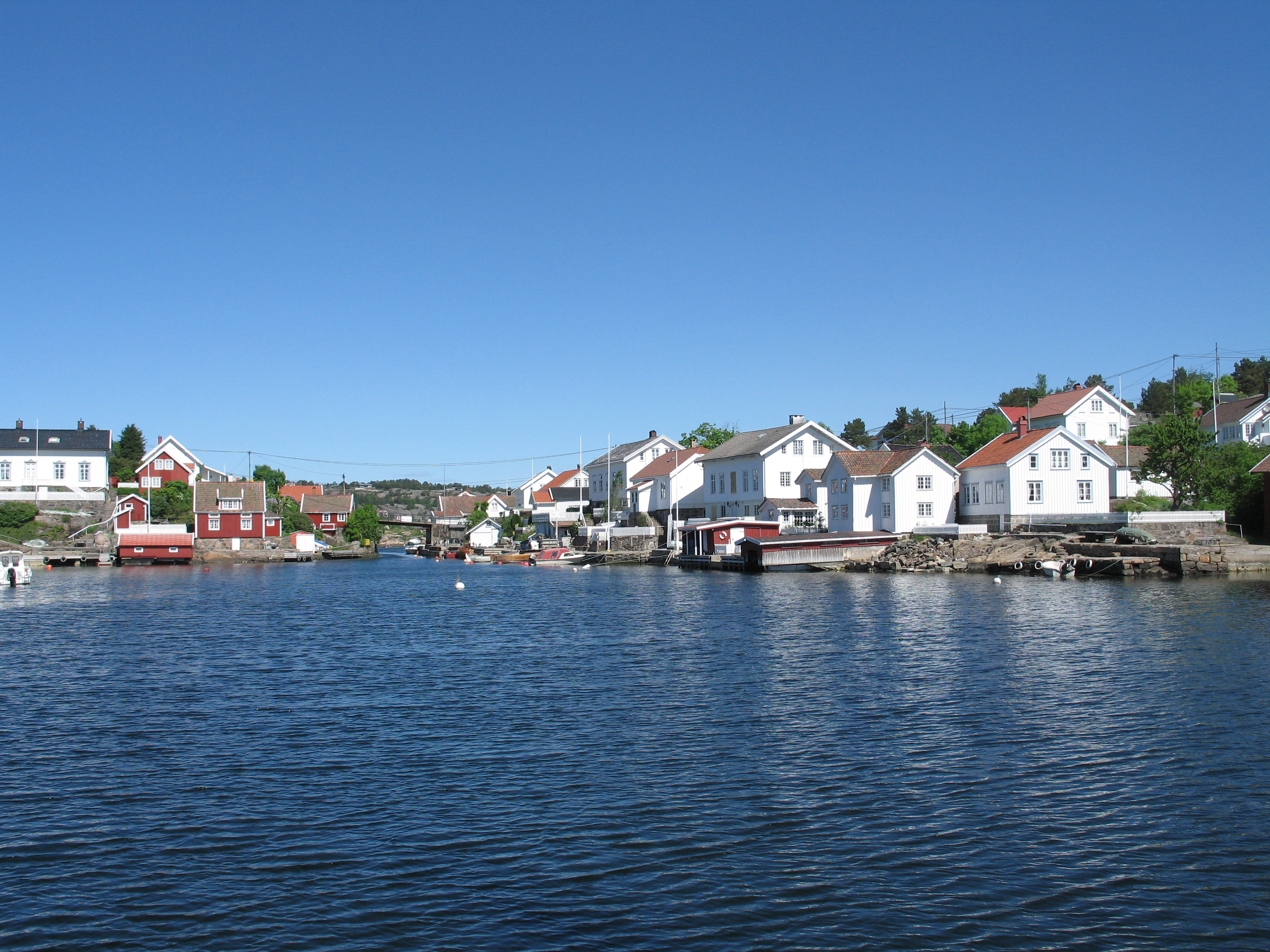

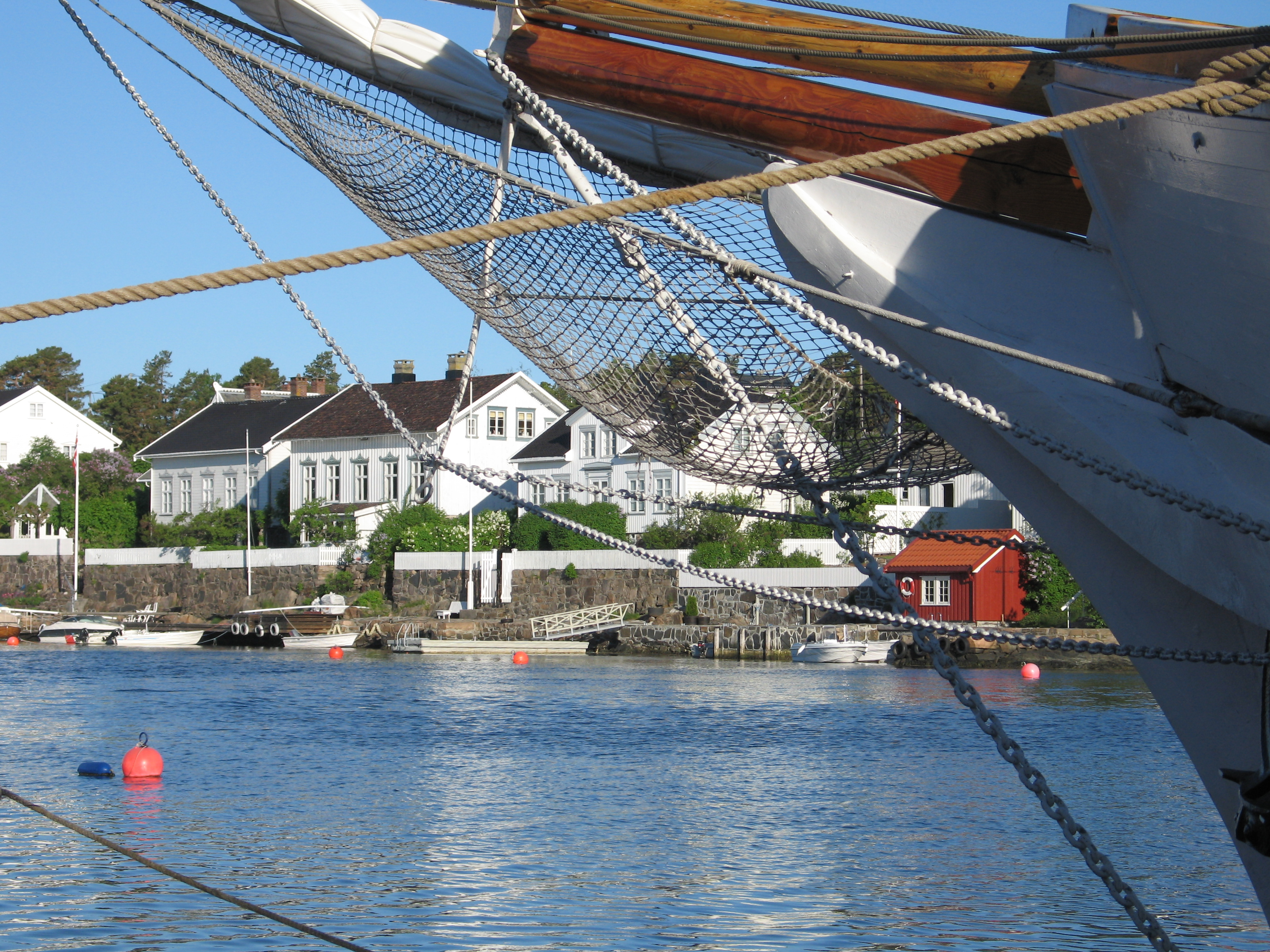

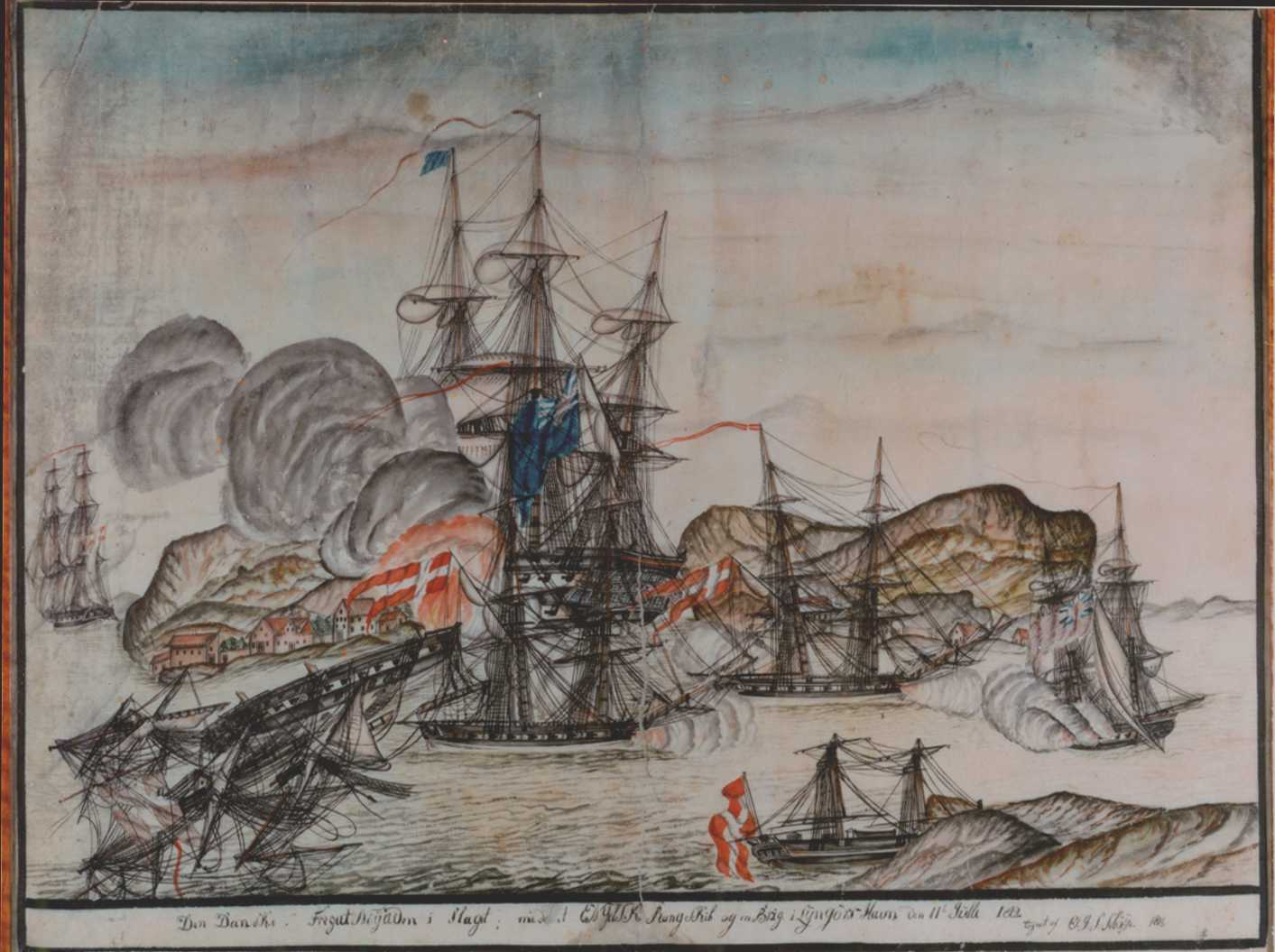
Battle of Lyngør (painting)

== Climate ==
Climate data for Lyngør Lighthouse 1991-2020 (4 m)
Month	Jan	Feb	Mar	Apr	May	Jun	Jul	Aug	Sep	Oct	Nov	Dec	Year
Mean daily maximum °C (°F)	3.4 (38.1)	3.1 (37.6)	5.5 (41.9)	9.1 (48.4)	13.9 (57.0)	17.7 (63.9)	20 (68)	19.6 (67.3)	16.1 (61.0)	11.2 (52.2)	7.1 (44.8)	4.2 (39.6)	10.9 (51.7)
Daily mean °C (°F)	1.2 (34.2)	0.7 (33.3)	2.6 (36.7)	6.1 (43.0)	10.8 (51.4)	14.7 (58.5)	17 (63)	16.8 (62.2)	13.5 (56.3)	8.9 (48.0)	5.1 (41.2)	2.1 (35.8)	8.3 (47.0)
Mean daily minimum °C (°F)	−0.7 (30.7)	−1.3 (29.7)	0.4 (32.7)	3.8 (38.8)	8.3 (46.9)	12.1 (53.8)	14.4 (57.9)	14.3 (57.7)	11.2 (52.2)	6.9 (44.4)	3.2 (37.8)	0.2 (32.4)	6.1 (42.9)
Average precipitation mm (inches)	86 (3.4)	61 (2.4)	59 (2.3)	52 (2.0)	67 (2.6)	67 (2.6)	81 (3.2)	108 (4.3)	102 (4.0)	130 (5.1)	114 (4.5)	91 (3.6)	1,018 (40)
Source 1: Yr (precipitation)
Source 2: NOAA - WMO averages 91-2020 Norway
