= Battle of Lyngør =

1812 battle of the Gunboat War

Coordinates: 58°38′N 9°08′E

- Part of the Gunboat War
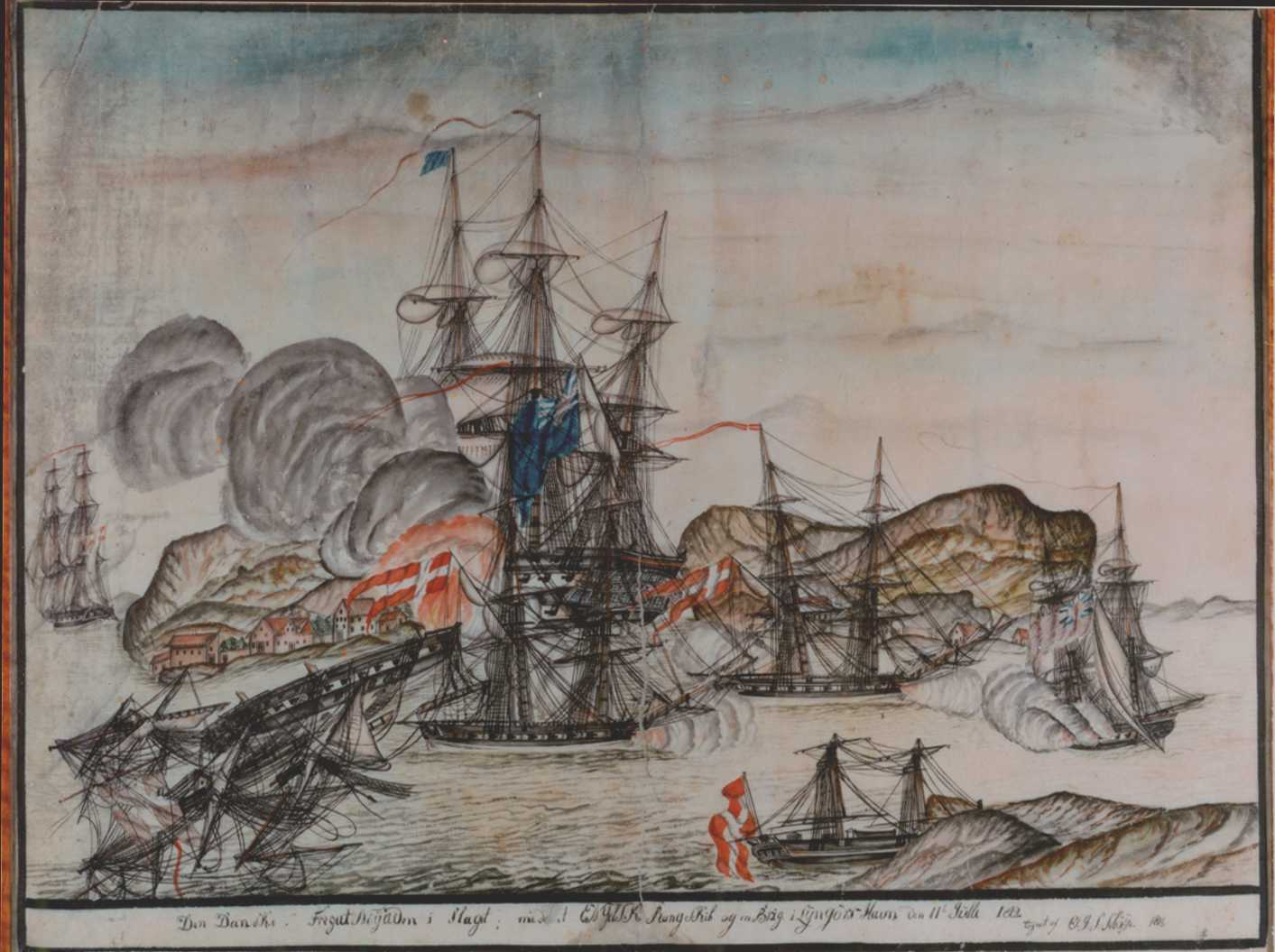
- 1816 illustration of the battle
| Date | 6 July 1812 |
| Location | Off Lyngør, Skagerrak |
| Result | British victory |

Belligerents
| United Kingdom | Denmark–Norway |

Commanders and leaders
| James Stewart | Hans Peter Holm (WIA) |

Strength
| 1 ship of the line 3 brig-sloops | 1 frigate 3 brigs |

Casualties and losses
| 9 killed 26 wounded 2 missing | 133 killed 88 wounded 1 frigate destroyed |

The Battle of Lyngør was fought on 6 July 1812 between the British and Dano-Norwegian navies as part of the Gunboat War. A British squadron of one ship of the line and three brig-sloops under James Stewart located the Dano-Norwegian frigate Najaden sheltering off Lyngør, and engaged and destroyed her in a fierce engagement; Najaden's captain Hans Peter Holm was wounded but survived, but 133 of his crew were killed and a further 87 wounded. The British in contrast suffered only 9 killed and 26 wounded, and the battle led to the destruction of Denmark–Norway's last major warship.

== Background ==
Denmark–Norway's attempt to remain neutral in the struggle between France and the United Kingdom and their respective allies came to an end after the United Kingdom's pre-emptive naval actions of 1807, in which most of the Danish navy was captured, the British operating under the possibility that Denmark–Norway was planning to join the Napoleonic Wars on the side of France. The British imposed a blockade on supply lines between Norway and Denmark in the Skagerrak sound, except for Norwegian ships transporting lumber bound for Britain. The resulting blockade isolated Norway from both Denmark and from the market and economically impacted Norway. Most exports were stopped, as well as grain imports from Denmark. The blockade resulted in an economic crisis for Denmark–Norway.

The Norwegians preferred to limit military operations to coastal defence. Nevertheless, what was left of the Dano–Norwegian fleet after the Battle of Copenhagen was committed to trying to break the blockade. After years of skirmishes, the Dano–Norwegian fleet was reduced to one major ship, the frigate Najaden, which they had finished constructing in 1811 with material salvaged from a ship-of-the-line destroyed in earlier battles. Najaden was under the command of Danish naval officer Hans Peter Holm. Three brigs – Kiel (under the command of Otto Frederick Rasch), Lolland, and Samsøe – accompanied Najaden.

The British saw an opportunity to end the blockade and finish what remained of Dano-Norwegian seapower. They therefore sent the 64-gun third rate ship-of-the-line Dictator and three brigs, the 18-gun Cruizer-class brig-sloop Calypso, 14-gun brig-sloop Podargus and the 14-gun brig Flamer to seek out the last remnants of the Dano-Norwegian fleet. Captain James Stewart's plan was to chase down Najaden and sink it, thereby giving Britain total control over the trade routes across the Skagerrak between Norway and Denmark, and effectively ending Danish involvement in the Napoleonic Wars. In a pitched battle, his ship-of-the-line would easily defeat the frigate. As a consequence, Stewart, a Scotsman known in the Royal Navy as "Mad Jim", was looking for a naval confrontation. Captain Holm's plan was to avoid engaging the British ships. He relied on his superior knowledge of the local waters to attempt to evade Stewart's pursuit. The group of Dano-Norwegian naval forces based in Norway was utilizing a sheltered but weakly defended anchorage on the coast of Norway as a base of operations. If attacked by a superior naval force, the Dano-Norwegian warships would be trapped, cornered in a geographic death trap in the skerries from which there was no apparent escape, except through the one entrance, which was inadequately protected by Dano-Norwegian coastal batteries.

== Battle ==
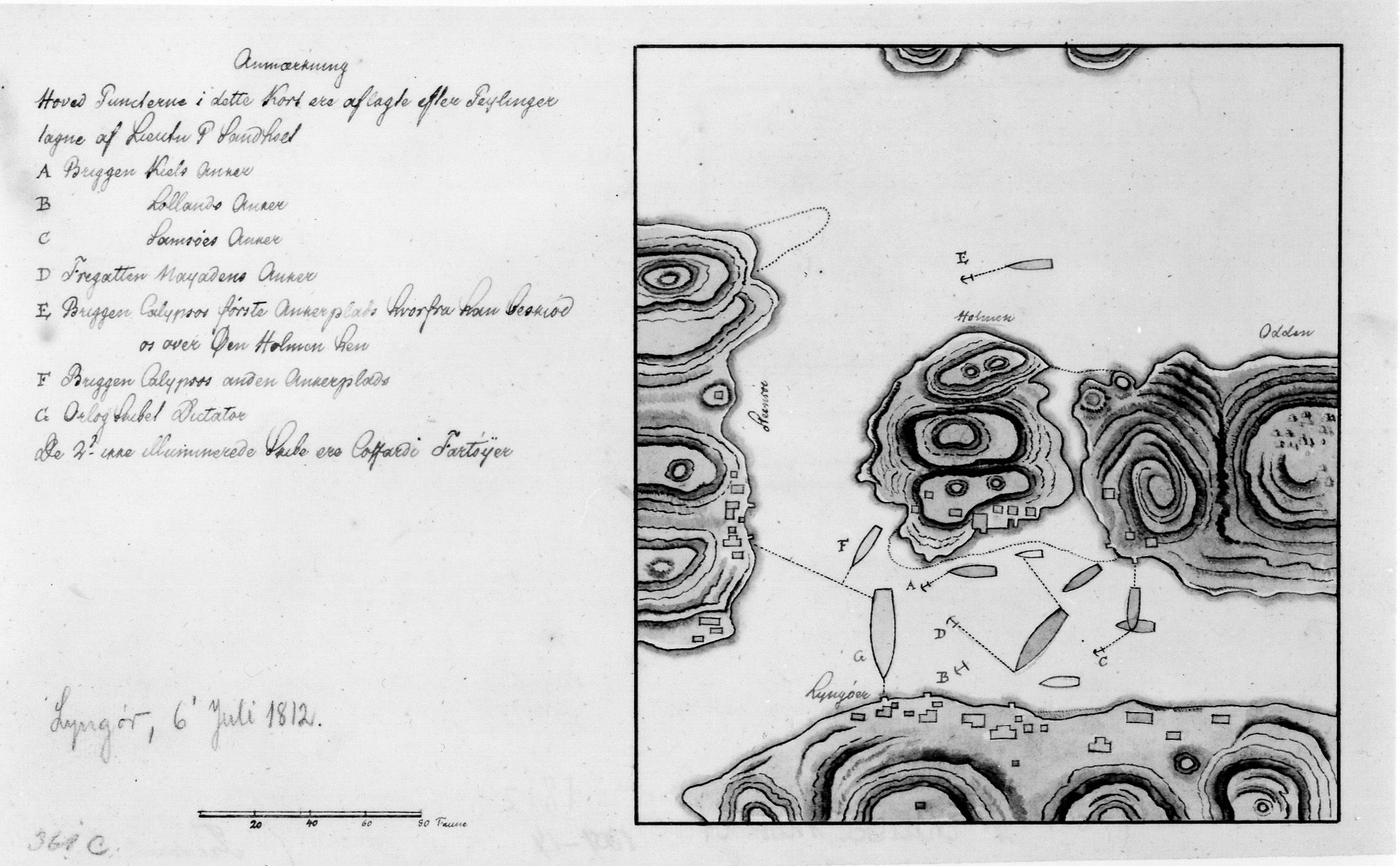
Plan of the battle created on the day it took place on the basis of the observations of lieutenant P. Sandholt.

Najaden had anchored near the island of Sandøya near Tvedestrand, where the captain felt secure. His premise was that no British ship would risk running ashore in the unfamiliar and craggy archipelago. He accepted an invitation to dine with the captain of the Samsøe and even went ashore on the island after his meal. From the hills above, he saw that the British ships were inside the archipelago and headed in his direction.

Rushing back to his ships, he ordered the ships along an inner route north-east, toward Lyngør. Podargus was in the van of the British squadron, apparently with a pilot on board who was familiar with the waters. Still, she ran aground at Buskjærsteinen and Stewart ordered Flamer to stay behind and assist the stricken brig. Several smaller Dano-Norwegian boats immediately attacked Podargus and Flamer. Among them were Lieutenant Parnemann with the armed launch Kiøge Bugt and gunboat No.3 under the command of Lieutenant Ring. Four additional gunboats from the Arendal Division, commanded by Captain-Lieutenant Dietrichson, subsequently reinforced them. Lastly, the battery at Digernes (on the seaward side of Borøya island, which is three miles southwest of Lyngør), also fired on the two British brigs. Although Podargus and Flamer sustained damage, they were eventually able to rejoin Dictator after the main battle was over.

Najaden went into the narrow sound of Lyngør where she anchored between Holmen and Odden, detaching most of her supporting vessels to fight Podargus and Flamer. Captain Holm assumed that the Dictator could not follow down the narrow sound, and assumed that the attack would come from smaller vessels and over Holmen, and set his broadside towards Holmen. However, Stewart sailed into the sound, dropped an anchor behind him, and ran ashore with his broadside perpendicular to the sound. Using his anchor line for leverage, he positioned Dictator to set its broadside against Najaden at a range of 35–40 metres. Unable to turn, Najaden had its broadside pointing away from the opposing ship and was dead in the water.

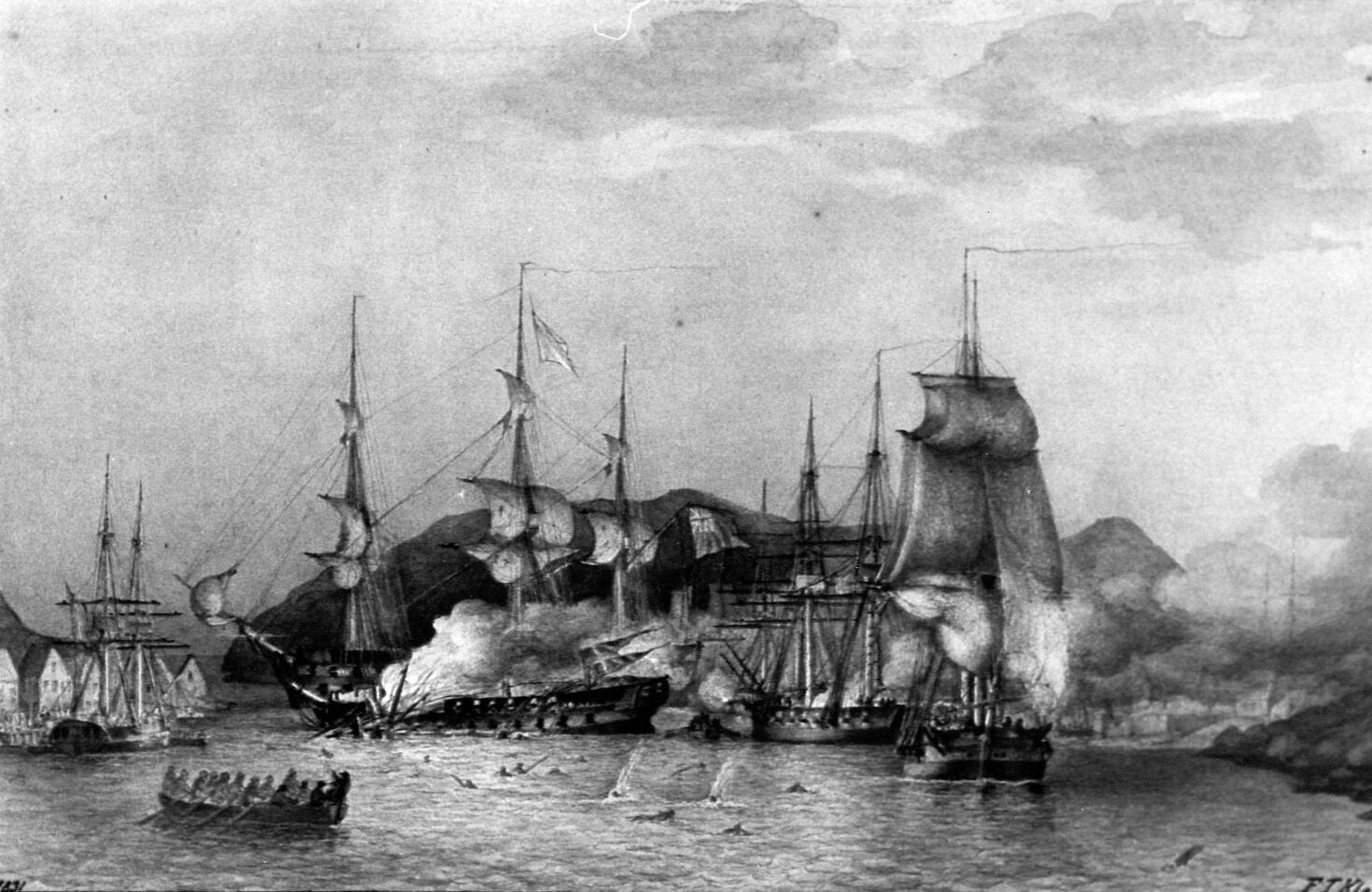
HDMS Najaden on fire during the battle

At about 9:30 pm, Dictator unleashed a 15-minute barrage against Najaden that amounted to some four tons of ordnance. The barrage broke her main mast almost immediately and caused a fire on the ship. Dictator proceeded to bombard the two Danish brigs anchored nearby, causing them to lower their colours and surrender at 21:47 pm. The British captured Laaland and Kiel as prizes but abandoned them after the two vessels grounded. The British did not set fire to either as they still had their crews and wounded aboard.

Najaden listed to port and started taking on water through the gun ports; the fire spread to the powder magazine and the ship detonated at 22:10 pm. Within 45 minutes, Najaden had sunk, having suffered 133 dead and 82 wounded. Captain Holm survived, only to drown in an accident a few months later.

The battle resumed as the Norwegian gunboats found their way into Lyngør. At 01:00 am, all the Norwegian gunboats nearby had made it into the sound and entered battle, forcing the British to abandon the captured Danish brigs. Stewart eventually deemed the situation threatening, and the Dictator was hauled clear at 02:00 am. She ran aground once more, however, and several cannon had to be moved to the rear of the ship in order for her to break free - which she did at 05:00 am. Dictator and Calypso set sail, exited Svalsund and headed east under constant fire from the gunboats. The small boats caused significant damage to the British ships, but the exhausted rowing crews were unable to pursue the sailing ships, which escaped to sea.

The action cost Dictator five killed and 24 wounded, Calypso three killed, one wounded and two missing, and Flamer one killed and one wounded. Overall, the Danes recorded their losses as 300 men killed or wounded. Commander Weir of Calypso was immediately, and Commander Robilliard of Podargus in the ensuing December, promoted to post-captain; Dictator's first lieutenant, William Buchanan, was made a commander.

In 1847 the surviving British participants were authorized to apply for the clasp "Off Mardoe 6 July 1812" to the Naval General Service Medal.

== Aftermath ==
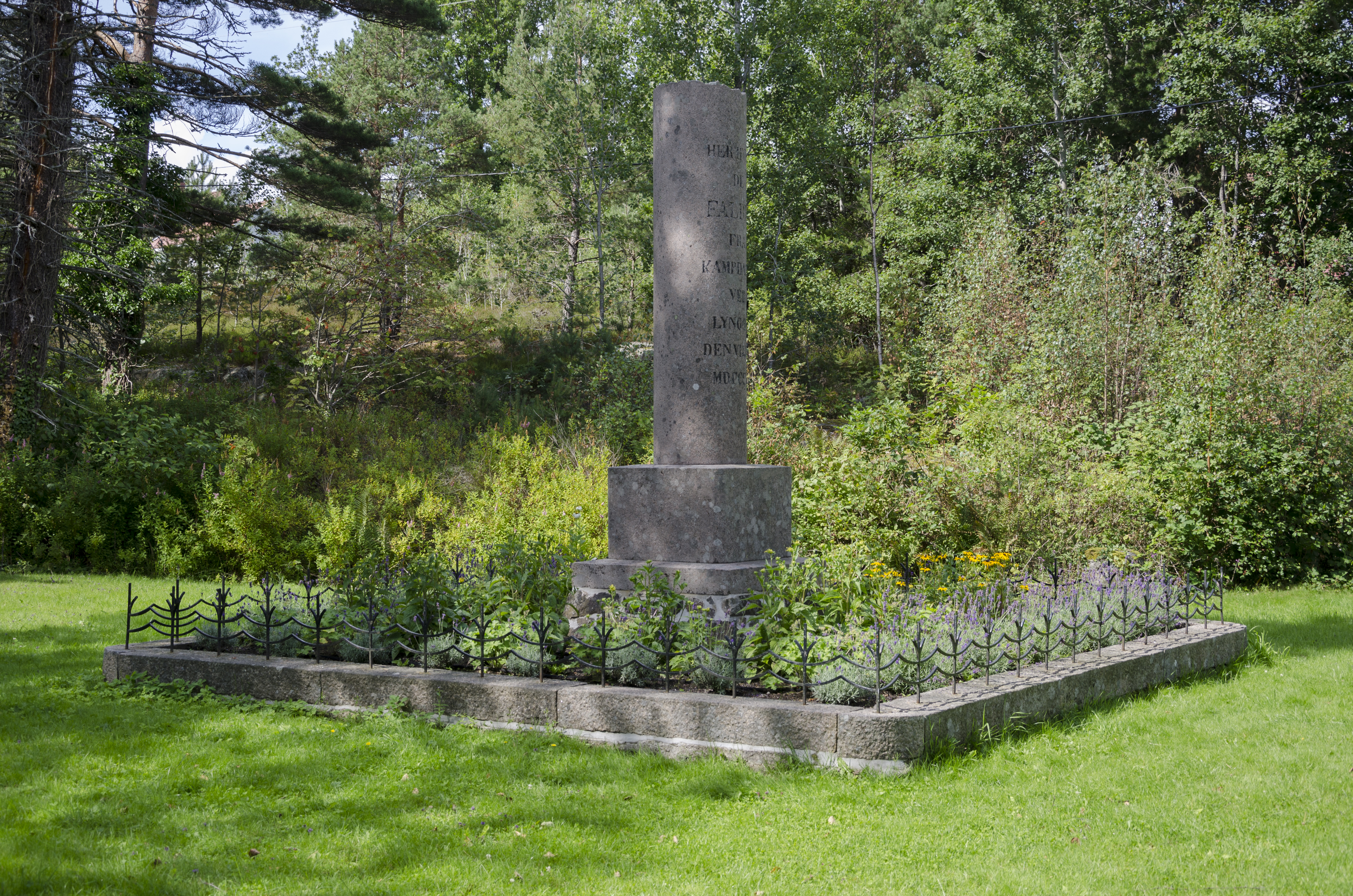
Memorial to the battle's casualties

The battle led to the destruction of the last Dano-Norwegian major warship. In the Treaty of Kiel, Denmark ceded dominion over Norway, setting the stage for Norway's independence movement, causing her to set up her own parliament and constitution. The battle also freed up British naval resources to continue fighting the French navy in the Napoleonic Wars. For the 200th anniversary of the battle in 2012, a replica gunboat named Øster Riisøer III was constructed. A cannon, possibly from Najaden, was recovered from the harbour in 1995. The battle is commemorated by a play in Lyngør each year, and the wreck is a popular site for diving.
