= John Perkins (Royal Navy officer) =

Royal Navy officer (died 1812)

Captain John Perkins
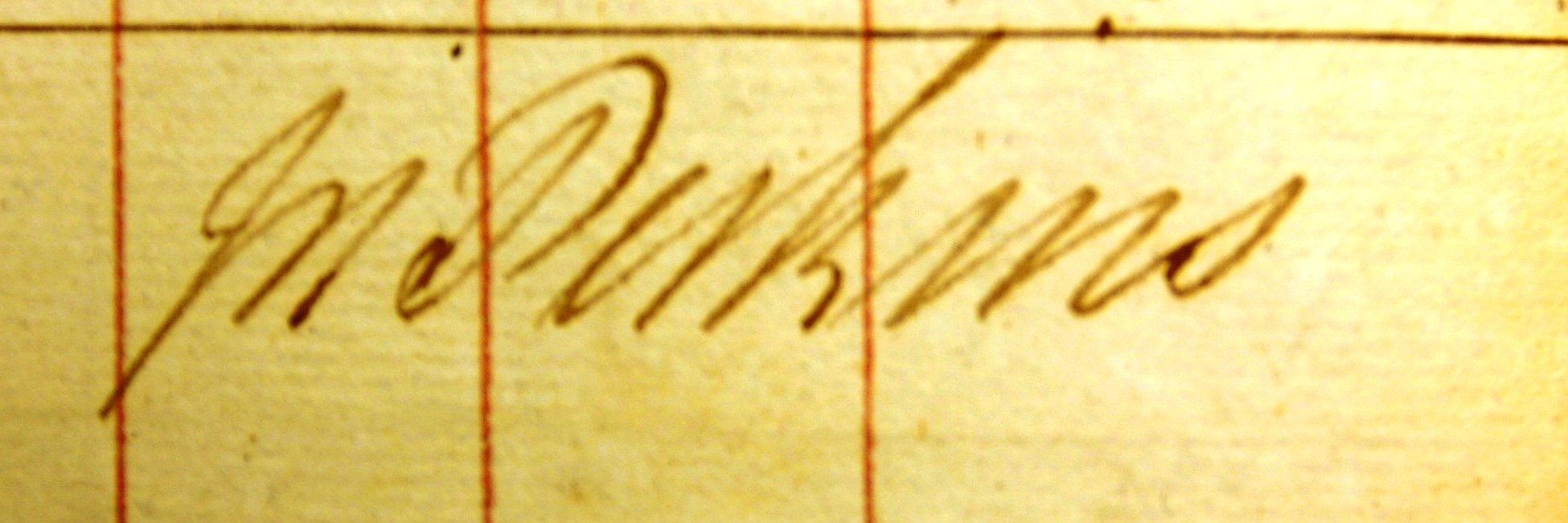
- Signature of Captain John Perkins from the Logbook of HMS Arab 1800, held at The National Archives, Kew, London
- Nickname: Jack Punch
- Born: Kingston, Jamaica
- Died: 27 January 1812 Kingston, Jamaica
- Allegiance: Great Britain; United Kingdom
- Branch: Royal Navy
- Service years: 1775–1804
- Rank: Captain
- Commands: HM Schooner Punch; HMS Endeavour; HMS Spitfire; HMS Marie Antoinette; HMS Drake; HMS Meleager; HMS Arab; HMS Tartar
- Conflicts: American War of Independence; Fourth Anglo-Dutch War; French Revolutionary Wars; Battle of West Kay; Napoleonic Wars

Captain John Perkins (died 27 January 1812), nicknamed Jack Punch, was a Royal Navy officer who served in the American War of Independence and French Revolutionary and Napoleonic Wars. The first Black officer in the British navy, he rose from obscurity to enjoy a successful naval career in which he captured at least 315 enemy ships.

Later in his career, Perkins acted as a spy for the Royal Navy and undertook missions to Cuba and Saint-Domingue. At the start of the Haitian Revolution, he was captured in Cap-Français and sentenced to death for supplying the rebel slaves with weapons, but British pressure forced French colonial authorities to release him.

After his rescue, he was promoted to commander in 1797 and then to captain in 1800. Perkins went on to cause an international incident with Denmark when he fired on two Danish warships during peacetime. Toward the end of his career, Perkins participated in the capture of the islands of Sint Eustatius and Saba from the French. He resigned from the British navy in 1804 and settled down in Jamaica where he died in 1812.

== Early life and career ==
John Perkins was probably born in Kingston, Jamaica, in the middle of the 18th century. Very little is known of his birth or early life. One account written 30 years after his death described him as of mixed race. At the time in the colonial West Indies, mixed-race people typically became slaves like their black parent, but occasionally a mixed-race son of a prominent white man was acknowledged by his father and given an education to prepare him for a clerical or administrative career; this may have been the case with Perkins.

In 1775, Perkins first appears in the records of the Royal Navy when he was appointed to the 50-gun HMS Antelope, the flagship of the commander-in-chief of the Jamaica station as an extra pilot. "His knowledge of the different ports, &C. in the West Indies was, perhaps, seldom equalled, and never surpassed." In 1778, he was placed in command of the schooner Punch, a ship probably armed with ten 2- or 4-pounder guns, though no detailed records survive. At this time, he received his nickname "Jack Punch", most probably earned because of the name of his command. During the next two years, Perkins claimed to have captured 315 ships, an average of three per week, a claim that was later endorsed by the Jamaican House of Assembly.

Admiral Sir Peter Parker, and subsequent admirals, used Perkins in clandestine missions against the French at Cap-Français, a province on the north coast of Saint-Domingue, and the Spanish in Havana, Cuba. Parker eventually commissioned Perkins as a lieutenant and gave him command of Endeavour on 25 February 1782. The 12-gun Endeavour was an American-built schooner with a keel of 60 feet and beam of 20. Governor Archibald Campbell stated in a letter of recommendation that "By the gallant exertions of this officer some hundred vessels were taken, burnt, or destroyed, and above three thousand men added to the list of prisoners of war in favour of Britain; in short, the character and conduct of Captain Perkins were not less admired by his superior officers in Jamaica, than respected by those of the enemy."

In 1782, Perkins captured a much larger vessel containing several important French officers. The commander of the Jamaica station, Admiral George Rodney, promoted Perkins to master and commander of Endeavour, and added two guns to her raising her armament to fourteen guns, thus putting her on the official Navy List as a sloop-of-war. Rodney's promotion of Perkins was disallowed. Rodney wrote later to Philip Stephens, First Secretary to the Admiralty, in an attempt to confirm the promotion. "I must therefore desire you will please represent to their Lordships, that on my arrival at Jamaica, I found Mr. Perkins lieutenant and commander of the Endeavour schooner – that he bore an excellent character, and had done great service." Despite his request, Perkins was demoted back to the rank of lieutenant and the guns ordered to be removed. At the end of the American War of Independence, he was "on the beach" (meaning that he was without a posting on a ship) as a half-pay lieutenant.

For several years between 1783 and 1790, Perkins disappeared from the books of the Royal Navy. It may be during this time that he turned to piracy as there is a French source and several English records that describe him as such.

In 1790, fifteen years after he had first joined the navy, Perkins made an application to the Jamaican House of Assembly for their assistance in achieving his promotion. After presenting his certificates to the assembly, the assembly investigated Perkins's claim and resolved to make an application to the Admiralty for his promotion to post-captain.

== Capture on Saint-Domingue ==
In 1790, Perkins volunteered once more and served under Admiral Philip Affleck. For several years there is no record that he held an official command but in 1792, Captain Thomas McNamara Russell of the 32-gun frigate HMS Diana, on a relief mission to the authorities on Saint-Domingue, was informed that a British officer was under arrest and due to be executed in Jérémie for supplying arms to the rebel slaves. Officially, Britain and France were not at war and Russell requested that Perkins be released. The French authorities promised that he would be and then later refused. After numerous letters had been exchanged, Russell determined that the French had no intention to release Perkins. Russell sailed around Cap-Français to Jérémie and met with the 12-gun HMS Ferret under Captain Nowell. It was agreed that Nowell's first lieutenant, an officer named Godby, would go ashore and recover Perkins while the two ships remained offshore within cannon shot, ready to land an invasion force if need be. Lieutenant Godby landed and, after negotiations, Perkins was released. Perkins then disappears once more from the records for a short time.

== Return to service ==
In September 1793, Perkins returned to the books of the Navy. Perkins is listed as commanding HMS Spitfire, a 4-gun schooner. He accompanied Commodore John Ford's squadron when the British, at the request of French Royalists, mounted a campaign against Saint-Domingue. On arrival, Ford's squadron captured, amongst other vessels, a schooner belonging to the French Navy named Convention Nationale. She was renamed HMS Marie Antoinette and Ford gave command of her to Perkins. Ford described Perkins as "an Officer of Zeal, Vigilance and Activity." In 1794, Marie Antoinette made up part of the squadron commanded by the newly promoted Rear Admiral Ford that accompanied Brigadier General John Whyte that briefly captured Port-au-Prince. At the time, some forty-five vessels lay in harbour and these were all captured. In 1796, Marie Antoinette made up part of a small squadron that captured the schooner Charlotte and brig Sally. Perkins remained with her until he was promoted to master and commander.

=== Promotion to commander ===
The circumstances of his promotion are unrecorded, but in 1797, Admiral Hyde Parker promoted Perkins to commander of HMS Drake, a brig of 14 guns. Subsequently, HMS Drake, in company with a squadron under Captain Hugh Pigot, consisting of the 32-gun frigates HMS Hermione and HMS Quebec, and the cutter HMS Penelope, were involved in the cutting out of eight enemy ships at Port-de-Paix on 20 April 1797. On 25 October 1798, Drake captured the French privateer La Favorite. The prize money for Perkins (amounting to 2/8 of the total value of the vessel) was 53 pounds, 13 shillings and 9 pence.

The front page of the HMS Arab logbook 1800 from The National Archives, Kew

In inflation-adjusted terms, this would be approximately £5,800 as of 2026.

In Drake, in company with Solebay, Captain Poyntz, Perkins captured four French corvettes, the 18-gun Egyptienne, the 16-gun Eole, the 12-gun Levrier and the 8-gun Vengeur on 24 November 1799 off Cape Tiburon.

=== Promotion to post-captain ===
Perkins was promoted on 6 September 1800 to captain in the 32-gun frigate HMS Meleager. In early 1801, Perkins moved to the 22-gun HMS Arab.

==== Battle of West Kay ====
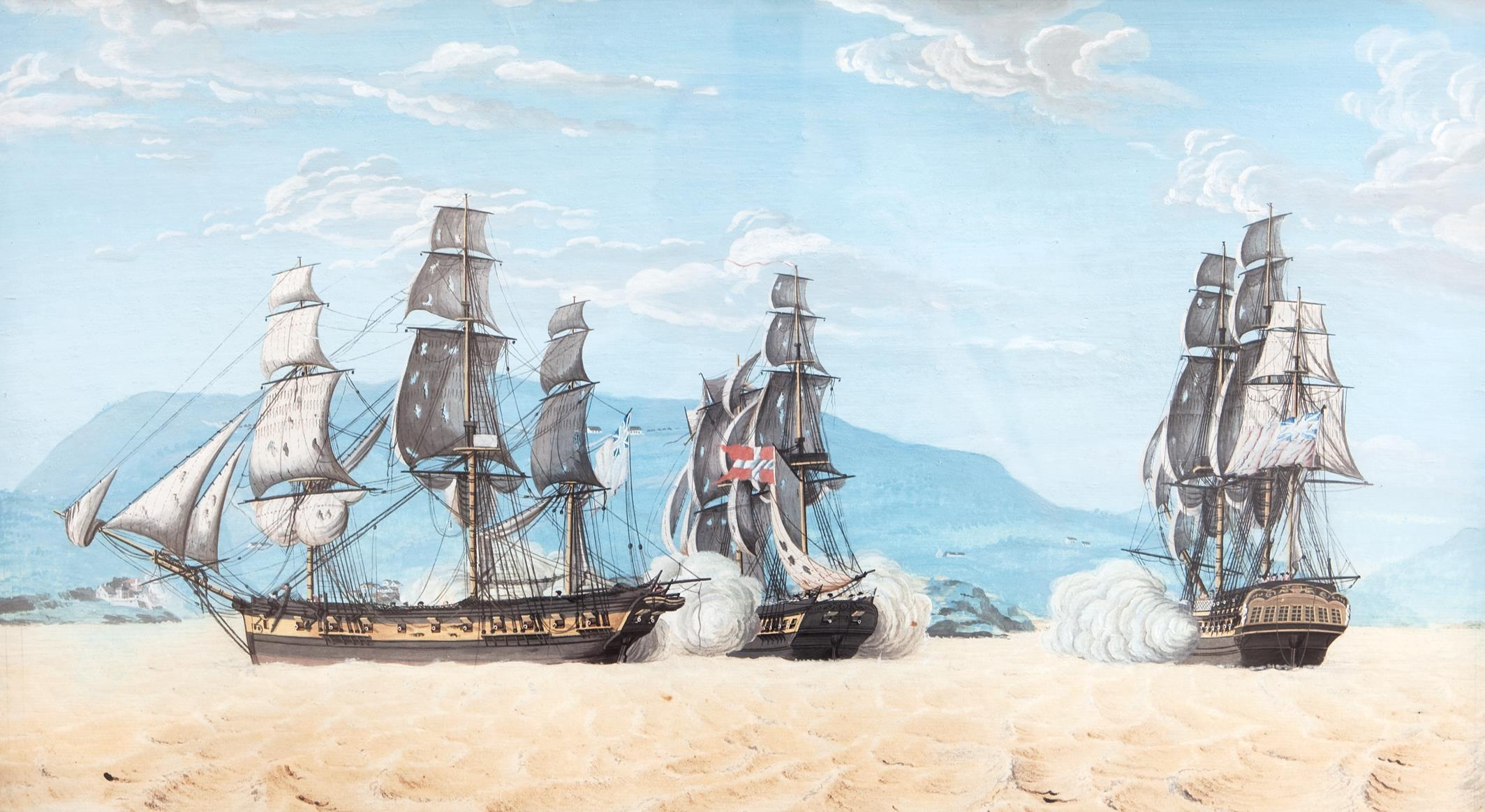
The Battle of West Kay in 1801

In March 1801, Arab, in company with the 18-gun British privateer Experiment, caught and challenged two Danish vessels, the brig Lougen, under the command of Captain Carl Wilhelm Jessen, and the schooner Den Aarvaagne (The Vigilant). Arab approached the two Danish vessels and, according to Danish accounts, without warning, fired several broadsides at Lougen before the Danish ship was able to return fire. Lougen, which had escaped serious damage, began to return fire steadily. Experiment initially attempted to capture Aarvaagne, but Aarvaagne obeyed orders to stay out of the fight and instead escaped south to Christiansted on St Croix with its intelligence on British actions. Experiment then joined Arab in the attack on Lougen, with the two British ships sandwiching the Danish ship. During the engagement, which lasted for over an hour, one of Lougen's shots struck the Arab's cathead and loosed the bower anchor. (Perkins reported that it was the first shot from Lougen that loosed the bower anchor.) Arab's crew was unable to cut the anchor free, leaving Arab unable to manoeuvre effectively. This allowed Jessen to steer a course that brought him under the protection of the shore batteries and then into St Thomas. Captain Jessen of the Lougen was awarded a presentation sword made of gold, a medal and 400 rixdollars (the equivalent of a whole year's salary for a Captain in the Danish Navy) by the Danish government for his actions.

On 13 April 1801, Arab captured the Spanish privateer Duenda.

=== Capture of Saint Eustatia and Saba Islands ===
On 16 April 1801, Perkins, in company with Colonel Richard Blunt and a detachment of the Buffs (Royal East Kent Regiment), laid siege to and captured the wealthy islands of Sint Eustatius and Saba, capturing their French garrisons, forty-seven cannon and 338 barrels of gunpowder. Eustatia had been the most profitable of the islands in the Dutch West Indies.

After several further cruises, Perkins was transferred in 1802 to the 32-gun frigate HMS Tartar.

== Later career ==
Between 20 November and 4 December 1803, Tartar was in company with Commodore John Loring's squadron when the squadron captured the French ships of war Le Decouverte, La Clorinde, La Surveillante, La Vertu, and Le Cerf. La Surveillante and La Clorinde were bought into British service. General Rochambeau, the commander of the French forces on Saint-Domingue, was on board La Surveillante at the time of her surrender. On 25 July 1804, while in company with HMS Vanguard under Captain James Walker, Tartar was involved in the capture of the French 74-gun ship of the line Duquesne, and two 16-gun brigs sailing with her. Tartar outsailed her larger companions and kept the Duquesne and her consorts engaged until the larger British ships came up and the French squadron surrendered. A seaman's share of the prize money aboard the Tartar for the capture was 6 shillings and 8 pence. A petty officer's share was 1 pound, 13 shillings and 11 pence.

== Final mission to Haiti ==
In January 1804, Jean-Jacques Dessalines, the commander of the slave rebellion in Haiti, declared independence from France. Perkins was sent by Admiral Duckworth and Governor Nugent in Tartar as a British observer to the island. Perkins was accompanied by Edward Corbet, a government advisor appointed by Nugent. Perkins described the situation on Haiti in his official letters to the Admiral. "I assure you that it is horrid to view the streets in different places stained with the Blood of these unfortunate people, whose bodies are now left exposed to view by the river and sea side. In hauling the seine the evening we came to our anchor several bodies got entangled in it, in fact such scenes of cruelty and devastation have been committed as is impossible to imagine or my pen describe."

== Retirement and death ==
In March 1804, Perkins resigned his commission on health grounds. It is rumoured that Perkins finally visited England in 1805 although there is no supporting evidence for this. There is no further record of his involvement with the Navy or Haiti. Perkins died on 27 January 1812 at his home in Jamaica. According to his obituary, he suffered for many years with a condition described as "asthma" and this was the cause of his demise. His obituary in the Naval Chronicle described his actions while in command of the schooner Punch; "he annoyed the enemy more than any other officer, by his repeated feats of gallantry, and the immense number of prizes he took." The will of John Perkins of Kingston, "a captain in His Majesty's Royal Navy", was proved in 1819.

The Jamaica Almanac for 1812 records Perkins as owning the Mount Dorothy estate in Saint Andrew Parish, Jamaica, and 26 slaves. It is probable that he had used some of his prize money to acquire property in Jamaica. In his will, Perkins directs that on his death all his property should be sold and, after payment of funeral expenses and debts, the money used to make provision for two women, Roberta Walker and Judith Lassley, both of Kingston; and for seven boys and four girls he acknowledges as his children.

== See also ==
- Slavery in the British and French Caribbean

== Bibliography ==
- The Naval Chronicle. Vol. 17. Bunney & Gold.
- The Naval Chronicle. Vol. 27. Bunney & Gold.
- Colledge, J. J.; Warlow, Ben (2006) [1969]. Ships of the Royal Navy: The Complete Record of All Fighting Ships of the Royal Navy from the 15th Century to the Present (3rd Rev ed.). London: Chatham Publishing. ISBN 978-1-86176-281-8. OCLC 67375475.
- Clowes, Sir William (2003). The Royal Navy: Vol. 4: A History – From the Earliest Times to 1900. Chatham Publishing. ISBN 1-86176-013-2.
- Clowes, Sir William (2003). The Royal Navy: Vol. 5: A History – From the Earliest Times to 1900. Chatham Publishing. ISBN 1-86176-014-0.
- Costello, Ray (2012). Black Salt: Seafarers of African Descent on British Ships. Liverpool University Press. ISBN 978-1-84631-818-4.
- Hubert, Cole (1967). Christophe King of Haiti. Eyre & Spottiswoode. ISBN 0-413-25786-X.
- Donnithorne, Christopher H. (undated) Documentation of the British Ships and Battle with the Danes on 3 March 1801, St. Thomas, Danish West Indies. (Unpublished paper accessed 2 September 2015).
- James, William; Chamier, Frederick (1837). The naval history of Great Britain: from the declaration of war by France in 1793 to the accession of George IV. Vol. 2. London: R. Bentley.
- James, William; Chamier, Frederick (1837). The naval history of Great Britain: from the declaration of war by France in 1793 to the accession of George IV. Vol. 3. London: R. Bentley.
- Mundy, Basil (2007). The Life And Correspondence of the Late Admiral Lord Rodney V2. Kessinger Publishing Co. ISBN 978-0-548-21801-3.
- Rodney, George Brydges (1932). Letter-Books and Order-Books of George, Lord Rodney, Admiral of the White Squadron, Volume 1. J.J. Little and Ives for The New-York Historical Society.
- Rodney, George Brydges (1932). Letter-Books and Order-Books of George, Lord Rodney, Admiral of the White Squadron, Volume 2. J.J. Little and Ives for The New-York Historical Society.
- Rodger, N.A.M. (2006). The Command of the Ocean: A Naval History of Britain 1649–1815. Penguin. ISBN 0-14-102690-1.
- Isaac Schomberg (1802). Naval chronology; or, An historical summary of naval & maritime events, from the time of the Romans, to the Treaty of Peace, 1802. Vol. 5. C, Rowarth, Bell Lane, Fleet Street. p. 378.
- Winfield, Rif (2007). British Warships in the Age of Sail 1714–1792. Seaforth Publishing. ISBN 978-1-84415-700-6.
- Wright, Philip (2002). Lady Nugent's Journal of Her Residence in Jamaica from 1801 to 1805. University of the West Indies Press. ISBN 1-84415-143-3.
