= HDMS Lougen =

Three ships of the Royal Danish Navy have borne the name HDMS Lougen. The name "Lougen" is derived from the river Laagen in Norway.

- The first HDMS Lougen (1791) was a brig of 18 guns, launched in 1791. She was active in the Caribbean where in March 1801, she fought off the British privateer Experiment and 22-gun warship HMS Arab in a single action. When the British captured the Danish West Indies in 1801 Lougen was part of the booty. The British later returned her to Denmark where she was broken up in 1803.
- The second HDMS Lougen (1805) was a sloop of 18 guns, later 20, launched in 1805, transferred to the Norwegian navy in 1814, transferred to Germany in 1825, and finally shipwrecked in 1881.
- The third HDMS Lougen (1941) was a minelayer launched in 1941 that her crew scuttled in Copenhagen harbour on 29 August 1943 before German forces could claim her. She was raised and refitted after World War II. There was an explosion on board in the early 1950s. She was decommissioned and broken up in 1975/76.
