= Battle of West Kay =

1801 battle of the English Wars

- Part of the English Wars
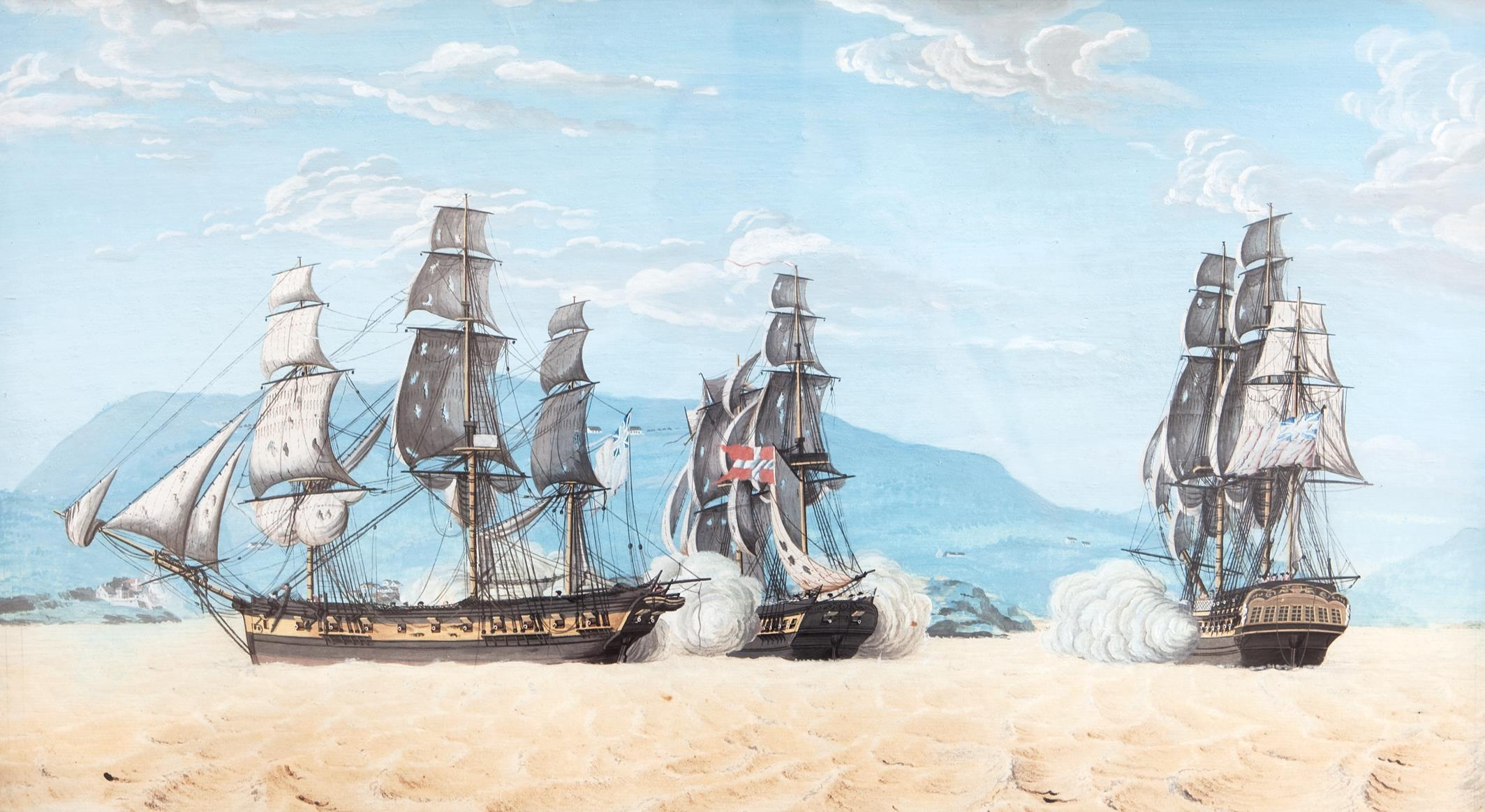
- Painting of the battle by Conrad Christian Parnemann
Date	3 March 1801
Location	Off West Kay, Caribbean Sea 18°19′N 65°03′W
Result	Danish victory

Belligerents
United Kingdom	Denmark-Norway

Commanders and leaders
John Perkins	Carl Wilhelm Jessen

Strength
1 post ship 1 privateer	1 schooner 1 brig

Casualties and losses
8 killed 10 wounded	1 killed 3 wounded

The Battle of West Kay (Danish: Slaget ved Fugleklippen), also known as the Battle of Fugleklippen, was a naval battle between Denmark–Norway and the United Kingdom. It took place at the Skerry of West Kay (Danish: Fugleklippen), near Saint Thomas and ended in a Danish victory.

== Background ==
Up until and including the Napoleonic Wars, privateering was a common aspect of naval warfare in the Caribbean. Denmark–Norway which owned the Danish West Indies, was keen to protect its trade and therefore sent two barques to guard and secure the trade on the islands in the late 18th century. Including in 1793 the HDMS Lougen sailed for the islands and later the Schooners Irisine and Den Aarvaagne also patrolled the islands.

At the end of February 1801, there were rumours of a British mobilization to invade the Danish West Indies. In response to the rumours, Governor-General Casimir Wilhelm von Scholten, sent two ships to gather more information. Lougen, under Carl Wilhelm Jessen, with Den Aarvaagne under Hans Munch, was ordered to examine the British intentions. Jessen chooses to distance Lougen from Den Aarvaagne, in order for Den Aarvaagne to return to Christiansted and inform the governor, in case of hostilities.

== Battle ==
When Lougen was near the uninhabited skerry of West Kay, presumably west of St. Thomas, two British ships, namely HMS Arab and the privateer Experiment, were approaching. Jessen could without problem have reached Charlotte Amalie, but instead stuck to his mission of investigating the British and came in for firing range of the British vessels Arab under captain John Perkins shot three direct shots at Lougen. In response, Jessen asked the reason behind the shots, and when he did not get any answer from Arab, he countered by shooting a sharp shot under Arab's Union Jack. Arab replied by firing a whole Broadside at Lougen, which signaled the start of the confrontation.

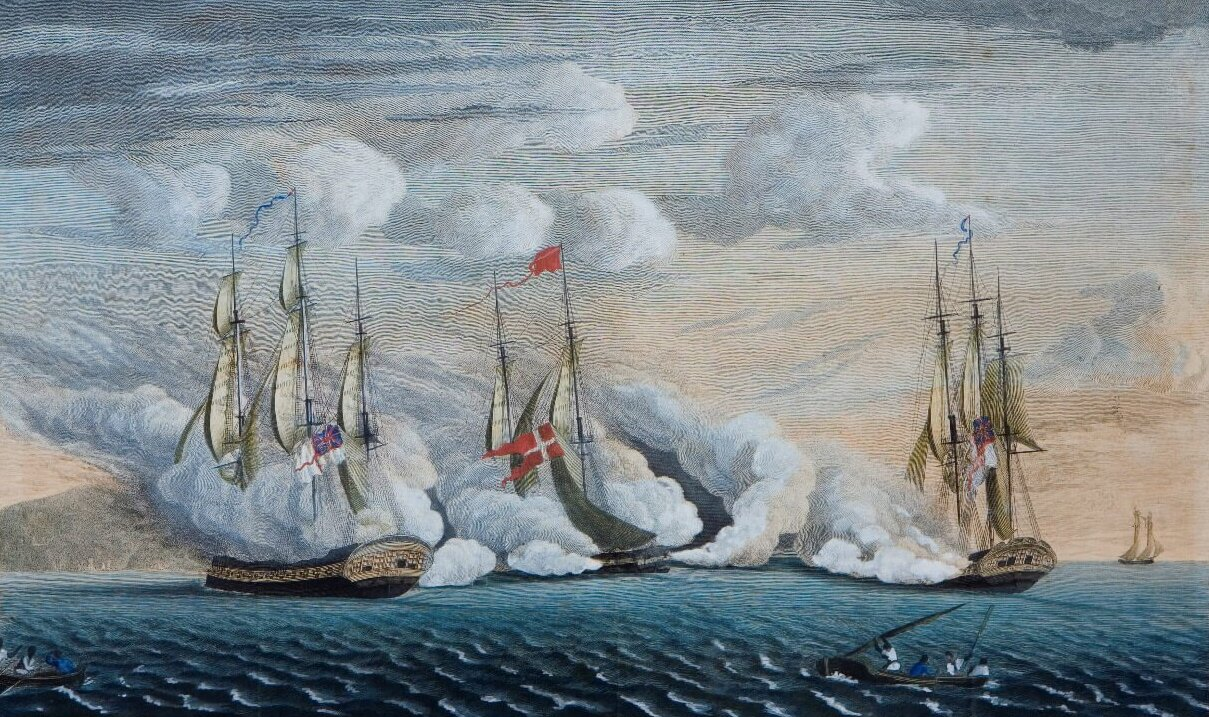
19th-century aquatint engraving of the battle

Experiment thereafter shot Lougen, and Lougen was therefore attacked by two sides The Danish ship was heavily focused on the maneuver in order for the British not to board Lougen, and cannons from the afterdeck was installed to fire against the British. Despite the shelling, Jessen managed to order Den Aarvaagne to return to Christiansted and inform the general-governor. The attacked Lougen sailed to the coast of St. Thomas for the protection of Coastal artillery. When the coastal artillery shot at Arab, it retreated to Tortola and the now alone, Experiment instead pursued Den Aarvaagne which were on its way to St. Croix. Jessen quickly followed Experiment and surrounded by artillery from both sea and land, Experiment retreated from battle.

== Aftermath ==
The Danish brig lost one member of its crew and three were wounded, and Lougen was damaged on several fronts. The British had suffered a bigger loss with eight dead and ten wounded.

Carl Wilhelm Jessen returned to Denmark in the summer 1801 and was awarded The King's Gold Honour Saber, by Crown Prince Regent Frederick with the inscription "For expelled against 3 March 1801" In addition he received a bounty worth 400 Danish rigsdaler. He would later command the Danish Royal Navy in the Battle of Zealand Point.

Despite this Danish victory, on 28 March 1801, a British fleet of 3 ships-on-the-line, 6 Frigates, with an additional 20 armed vessels and 4000 men, under the command of Sir John Duckworth, 1st Baronet invaded St. Thomas and quickly occupied the entire Danish West Indies, as the Danish were unwilling to put up resistance against such a superior force.
