= HMS Stately =

Ship of the line of the Royal Navy

History

Great Britain
- Name: HMS Stately
- Ordered: 10 December 1778
- Builder: Raymond, Northam
- Laid down: 25 May 1779
- Launched: 27 December 1784
- Honours and awards: Naval general Service Medal with clasps: "Egypt"; "Stately 22 March 1808"
- Fate: Broken up, 1814

General characteristics
- Class & type: Ardent-class ship of the line
- Tons burthen: 1388 (bm)
- Length: 160 ft (49 m) (gundeck)
- Beam: 44 ft 4 in (13.5 m)
- Depth of hold: 19 ft (5.8 m)
- Sail plan: Full-rigged ship
- Armament: Lower deck: 26 × 24-pounder guns; Upper deck: 26 × 18-pounder guns; QD: 10 × 4-pounder guns; Fc: 2 × 9-pounder guns

HMS Stately was a 64-gun third-rate ship of the line of the Royal Navy, launched on 27 December 1784 at Northam.

== French Revolutionary Wars ==
Sir Richard King took command of Stately at Portsmouth on 24 July 1793, which was reported in The Times newspaper.

In 1798 Stately was at the Cape of Good Hope where she was the venue for the court-martial of Mr. Reid, second mate of the East Indiaman King George. While they were both on shore, Reid had struck Captain Richard Colnett, captain of King George The court-martial sentenced Reid to two years in the Marshalsea prison. Because Colnett had a letter of marque, King George was a "private man-of-war", and the Navy's Articles of War applied at sea. Had Reid struck Colnett aboard King George, the charge would have been mutiny, for which the penalty would have been death.

The Admiralty had Stately converted for use a troopship in 1799. Because Stately served in the navy's Egyptian campaign (8 March to 2 September 1801), her officers and crew qualified for the clasp "Egypt" to the Naval General Service Medal that the Admiralty issued in 1847 to all surviving claimants. (Note: A first-class share of the prize money awarded in April 1823 was worth £34 2s 4d; a fifth-class share, that of a seaman, was worth 3s 11½d. The amount was small as the total had to be shared between 79 vessels and the entire army contingent.)

Mid November, 1802 reported under command of Capt. Scott.

== Napoleonic Wars ==
The Navy reverted her to a fully armed warship once war resumed after the end of the Treaty of Amiens.

=== Battle of Zealand Point ===
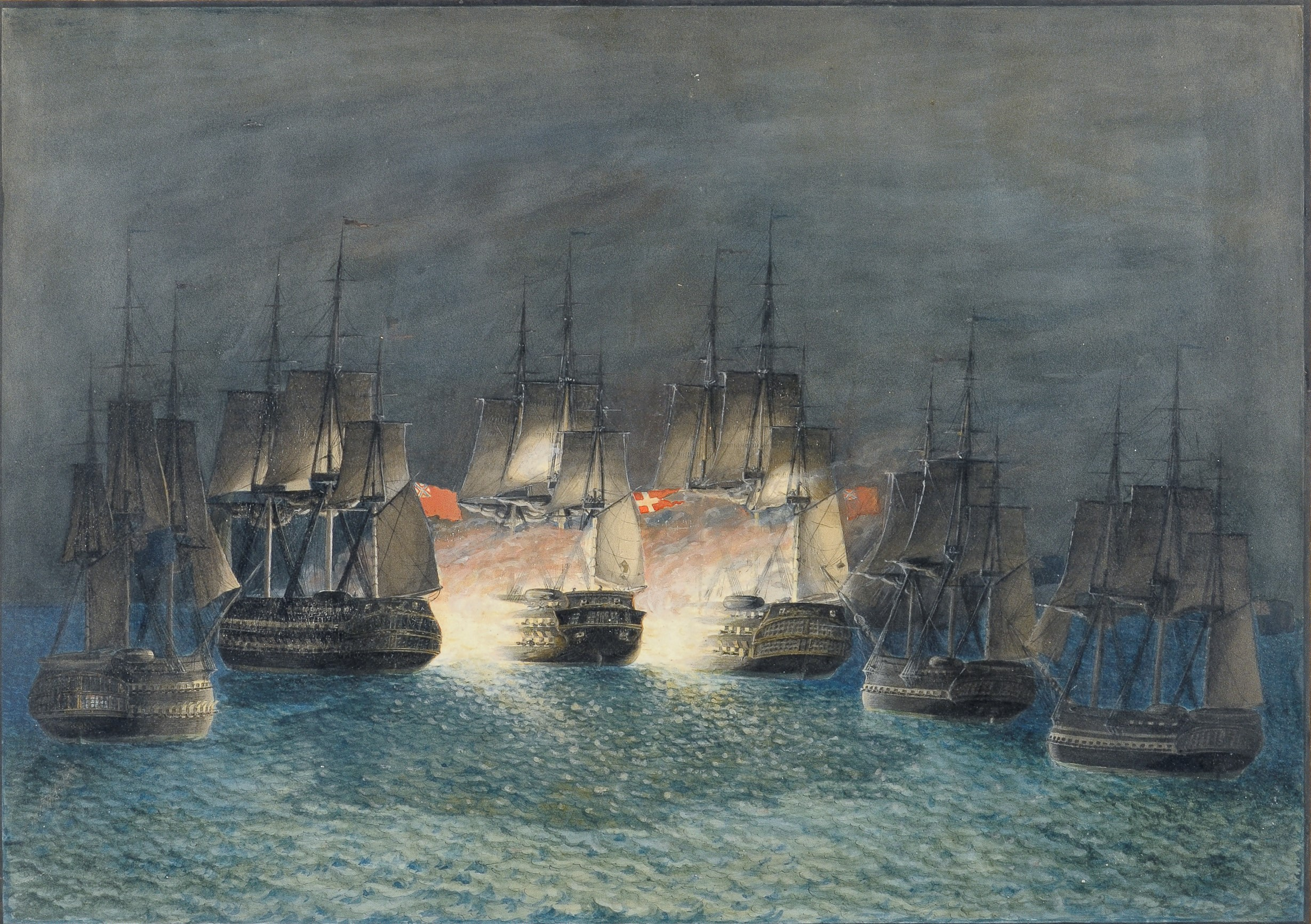
Battle of Zealand Point, 22 March 1808; depicting HMS Nassau and Stately with the British squadron closing in on Prinds Christian Frederik

On 22 March 1808, Stately and Nassau destroyed the last Danish ship of the line, Prinds Christian Frederik, commanded by Captain C. W. Jessen, in the Battle of Zealand Point.

In 1847 the Admiralty awarded the Naval General Service Medal with clasps "Stately 22 March 1808" and "Nassau 22 March 1808" to any still surviving crew members of those vessels that chose to claim them.

== Fate ==
Stately was broken up in 1814.
