= HDMS Holsteen =

Napoleonic-era ship

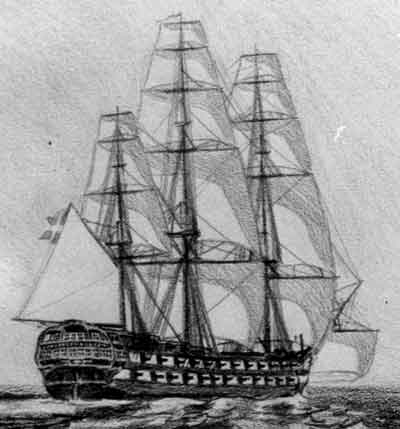
- A contemporary drawing of Holsteen

History

Denmark & Norway
- Name: Holsteen or Holsten
- Builder: Frederik Michael Krabbe, Nyholm, Copenhagen
- Laid down: 23 March 1770
- Launched: 11 April 1772
- Commissioned: 1775
- Out of service: 2 April 1801
- Fate: Taken by the British at first Battle of Copenhagen (1801)

United Kingdom
- Name: Holstein, renamed Nassau in 1805
- Acquired: By capture by the British at first Battle of Copenhagen (1801)
- Honours and awards: Naval General Service Medal with clasp "Nassau 22 March 1808"
- Fate: Sold 1814

General characteristics
- Class & type: Holsteen-class ship of the line
- Displacement: 1.01 Læster (=2,020 tons)
- Tons burthen: 139474/94 (bm)
- Length: 48.65 m (159.6 ft)
- Beam: 13.70 m (44.9 ft)
- Draught: 6.04 m (19.8 ft)
- Sail plan: Full-rigged ship

General characteristics (Danish service)
- Complement: 373–470 crew, plus 100 soldiers
- Armament: Lower deck: 24 × 24-pounder guns; Upper deck: 24 × 12-pounder guns; QD & Fc: 12 × 8-pounder guns

General characteristics (British service)
- Complement: 491 seamen and marines
- Armament: Lower deck: 26 × 24-pounder guns; Upper deck: 24 × 18-pounder guns; QD: 12 × 24-pounder carronades; Fc: 2 × 9-pounder guns + 2 × 24-pounder carronades

Holsteen (Note: This ship's name appears as Holsteen or Holsten in Danish records, and as Holstein in English. She was renamed Nassau in 1805.) was a 60-gun ship of the line in the Royal Dano-Norwegian Navy. She was commissioned in 1775 and the British Royal Navy captured her in the Battle at Copenhagen Roads on 2 April 1801. The British renamed the ship HMS Holstein, and later HMS Nassau. She participated in one major battle during the Gunboat War and was sold in 1814.

== Design ==
Holsteen was the name ship of her class of three vessels. The Danish naval builder, Frederik Michael Krabbe, was the chief designer and builder for the Danish navy. She was a foot narrower than the otherwise identical Oldenborg-class vessels.

== Danish service ==
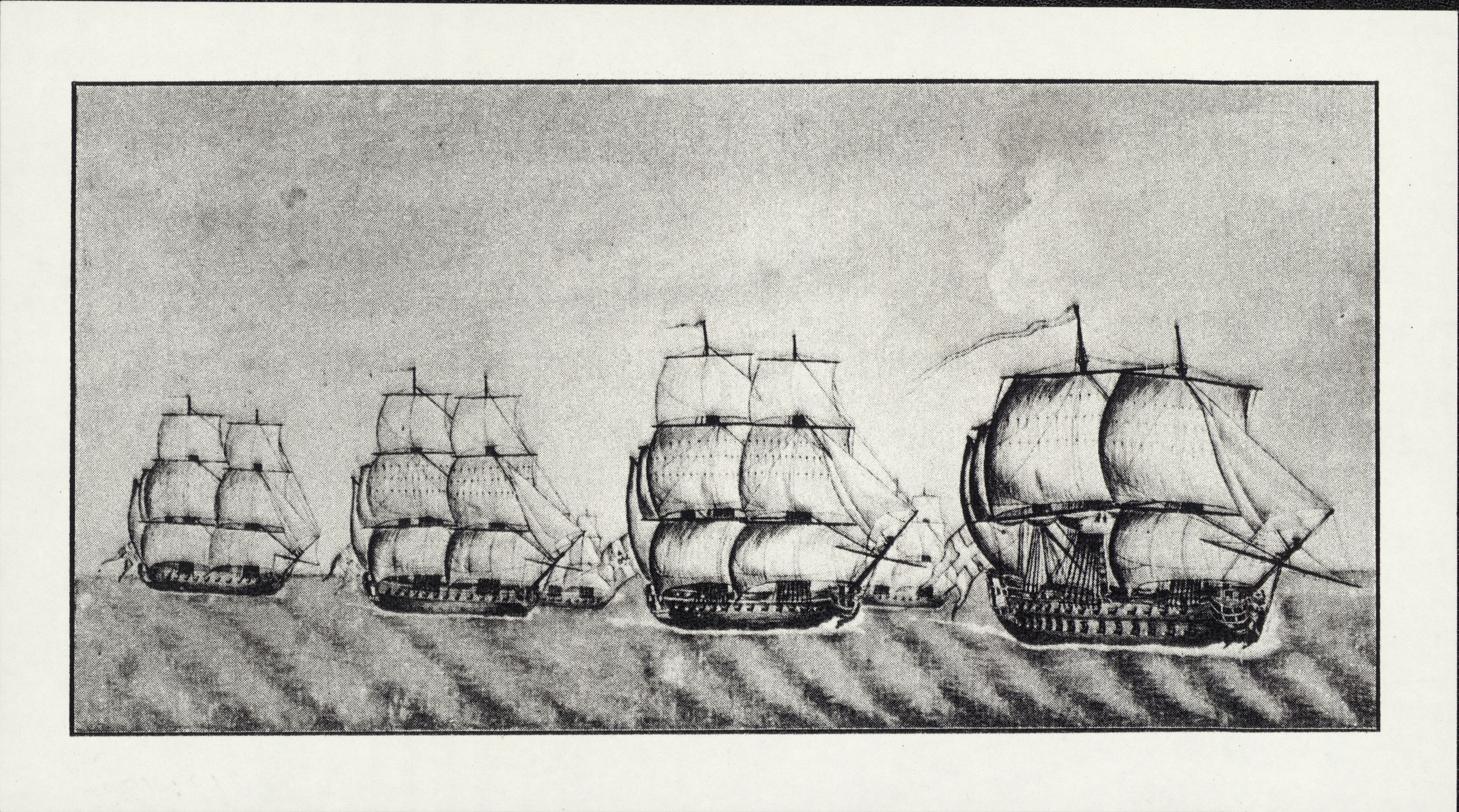
Holsteen escorting a convoy of three Chinamen and two East Indiamen back from the Cape of Good Hope.

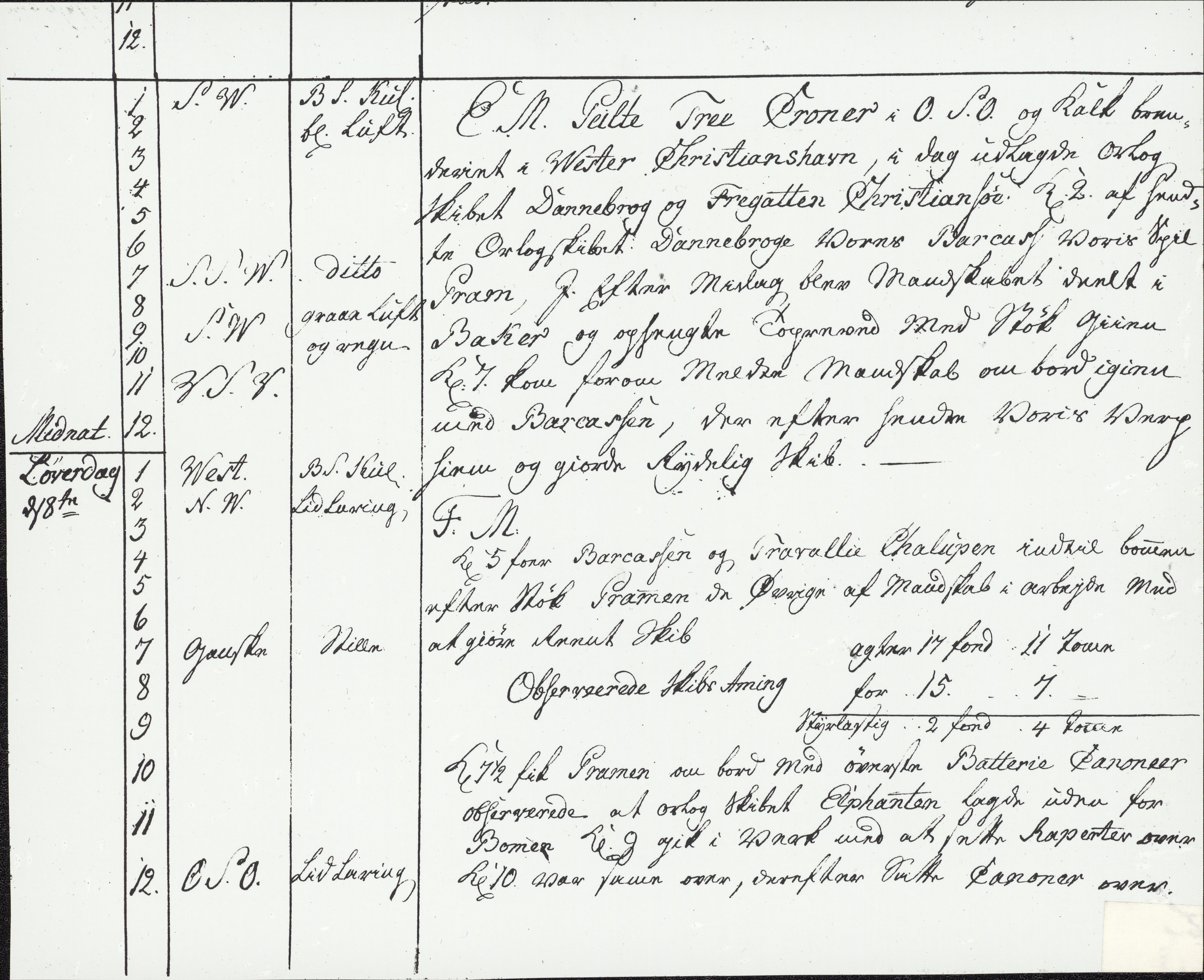
Ship journal, 1779.

In 1775, Holsteen fitted out during a voyage to Norway, where she was used as a command ship for the ships laid up in Trosvik (near the mouth of the Oslo Fjord), before she returned to Copenhagen in 1776.

From 25 May 1776 to 16 July 1780, Holsteen sailed to Lisbon, the Gold Coast, and Cape Town. On her return in July 1780, under command of Ulrik Christian Kaas, she performed guardship duties in Øresund, off Copenhagen until 24 October 1780.

From 1782 until 1783, Holsteen sailed with the Neutrality Squadron. She was a member of a squadron from June to October 1794 in Øresund and the following year in 1795, sailed with a squadron in Øresund and the North Sea.

In 1801, she was equipped as a blockship and took part in the Battle of Copenhagen on 2 April 1801 where she took her place towards the northern end of the defensive line between Infødstretten and Søhesten. For a short time Holsteen served as the flagship. About 14:15 her captain was forced to strike to the British.

== British service ==
On 12 April, the British sent Holstein back to Britain. She was the only one of the ships-of-the-line that the British chose to keep. All the rest they viewed as little more than floating batteries. She transported the wounded and sailed in company with Monarch and Isis, which too carried wounded. She arrived at Yarmouth on 22 April and was laid up there in ordinary until July 1802. Then Holstein transferred to Chatham on 16 October 1802 and was laid up there.

Between March and September 1805 Perry & Co., Blackwell, repaired her at a cost of £22,022. She was renamed Nassau and commissioned in September under Captain Robert Campbell, for the North Sea.

On 18 April 1806, Nassau was in company with Majestic, Agincourt, Dictator, Orpheus, Sparrow, and the hired armed cutter Florence captured the Prussian galliot Jonge Bartels. Five days later Nassau captured the Vissery. Then, a little more than a week later, on 2 May, Nassau and Stately captured the Nicholai and Martha. Several other British warships shared in the proceeds of the prize. Between May and June 1807 she escorted a convoy to Madeira.

In the late summer of 1807 she returned to Copenhagen where she participated in the second Battle of Copenhagen. After the surrender of the Danish fleet, Nassau, on 21 October 1807, was one of the vessels that escorted the surrendered Danish ships from Holmen to Kronborg. She then remained in Danish waters until February 1809.

=== Battle of Zealand Point ===
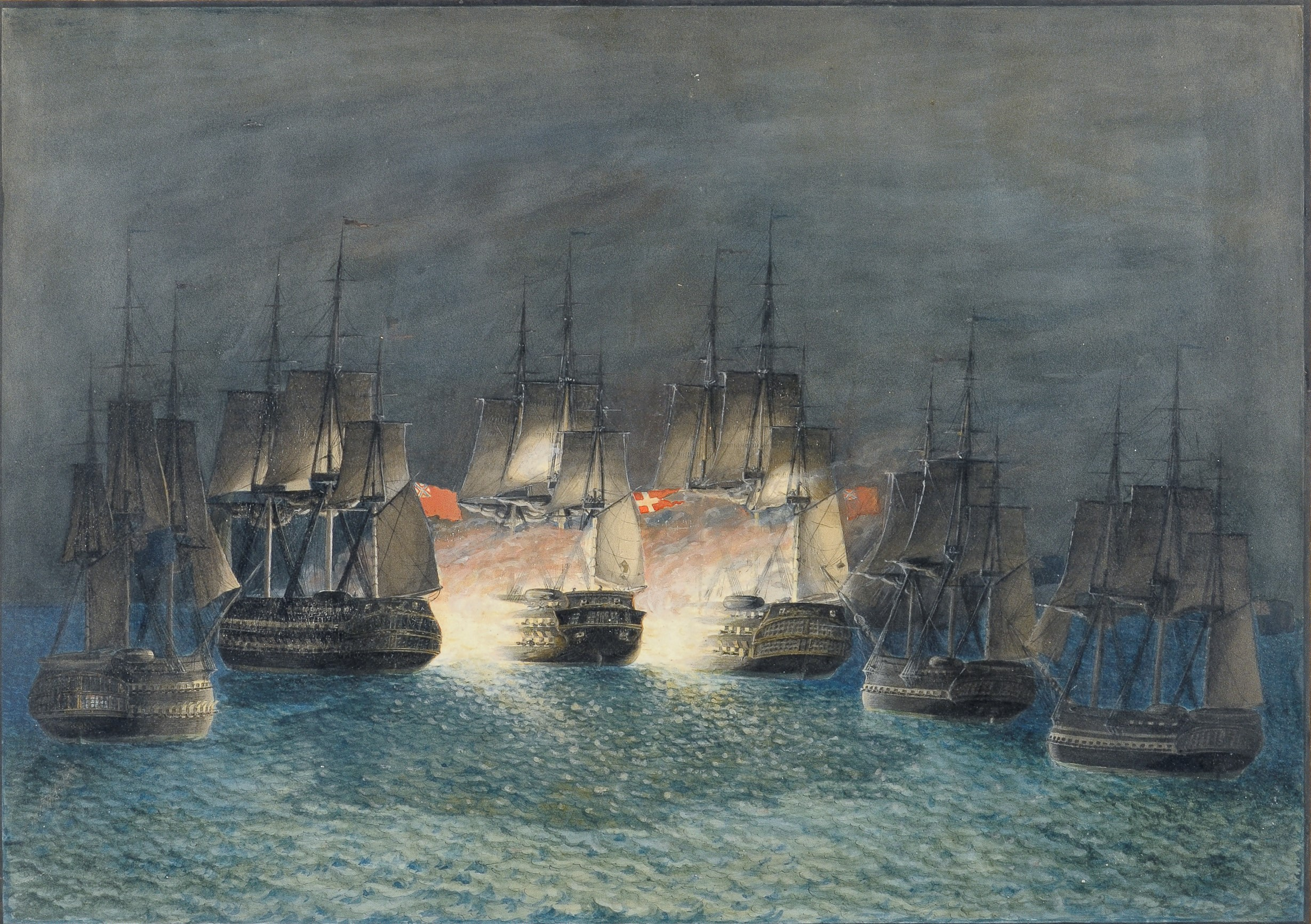
Battle of Zealand Point, 22 March 1808; depicting HMS Nassau and Stately with the British squadron closing in on Prinds Christian Frederik

On 22 March 1808 Nassau and the 64-gun Stately destroyed the last Danish ship of the line, HDMS Prinds Christian Frederik, commanded by Captain Carl Wilhelm Jessen, in a battle at Zealand Point.

The battle cost Nassau one man killed, one man missing, and 16 men wounded. In 1847 the Admiralty awarded the Naval General Service Medal with clasps "Stately 22 March 1808" and "Nassau 22 March 1808" to any still surviving crew members of those vessels that chose to claim them.

=== Further prizes in 1808 ===
On 19 April 1808 Stately and Nassau captured the Danish ships Industrie and Haabet Anker.

On the morning of 1 September 1809, Nassau was escorting a convoy of East Indiamen in the English Channel when she sighted a strange sail. Nassau sent her boats in chase and after two hours they were able to capture the French privateer lugger Jean Bart of Saint Malo. She was armed with four guns and had a crew of 25 men under the command of Enseigne de vaisseau Louis Ollivier Pilvesse. She was five days out of the Île de Batz and had made no captures.

== Fate ==
Nassau was laid up at Chatham in September 1809. In March of the next year she was commissioned as a prison ship under the command of Lieutenant William Field. He commanded her until she was sold for £2,510 on 3 November 1814.

== See also ==
- List of ships captured in the 19th century
