= Carl Wilhelm Jessen =

Danish naval officer and colonial administrator

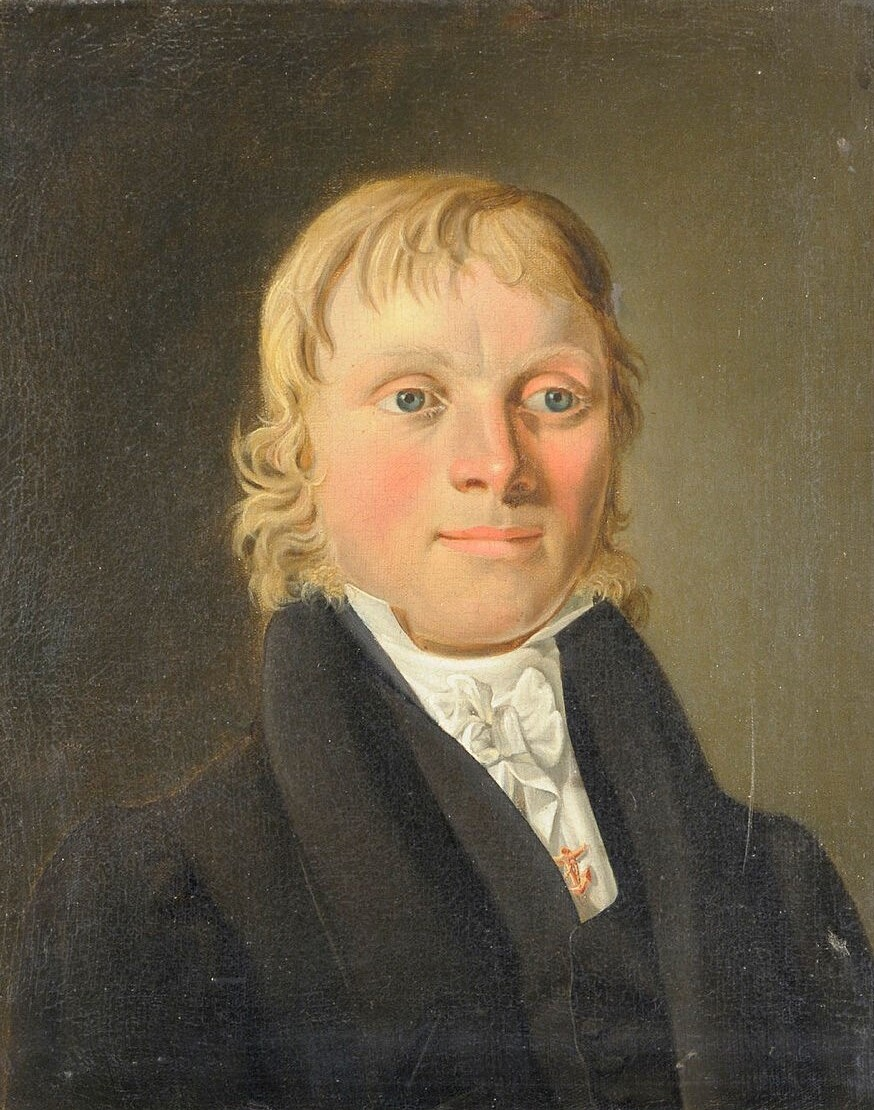
- Portrait by Hans Hansen
- Born: 10 July 1764; Fredensborg, Denmark
- Died: 30 March 1823 (aged 58); St Thomas, Danish West Indies
- Burial place: St Thomas, later re-interred at Holmens Kirke, Copenhagen; 55°40′36″N 12°35′0″E
- Relatives: Juliane Marie Jessen (sister)
- Military career
- Service years: 1776–1822
- Rank: Counter-Admiral
- Commands: HDMS Lougen; HDMS Prinds Christian Frederik; Trekroner Fort
- Conflicts: Battle of West Kay; Battle of Zealand Point
- Other work: Governor of St Thomas

Counter-Admiral Carl Wilhelm Jessen (10 July 1764 – 30 March 1823) was a Danish naval officer and colonial administrator who served as the governor of Saint Thomas in the Danish West Indies.

== Career ==
Carl Wilhelm Jessen was a Danish-Norwegian naval officer and the son of Councillor of State Nicolai Jacob Jessen and Marie Christine Jacobi.

Jessen became a naval cadet in 1776. He was commissioned as a junior lieutenant in the navy in 1782, and then was promoted senior lieutenant in 1789, commander in 1796, captain in 1803, senior captain in 1810, and commodore in 1815. He left the Danish navy as a counter admiral in 1822. He then became Governor of the island of St Thomas in the Danish West Indies.

== Ships and actions ==
Immediately after his lieutenant's examination, Jessen joined an expedition to the Caribbean with the small Lærken, where he participated in an engagement against two British privateers. Between 1784 and 1786 Jessen participated in commercial trading voyages with (Danish) West India Company ships as first mate. In 1789 he was a tutor at the Naval Cadet Academy and commander of a gunboat in Admiral Conrad von Schindel's squadron in the Baltic Sea. In 1790, as captain of Makrellen, he performed reconnaissance for the squadron.

During the period 1793–94 he was the deputy commander of the brig Lougen (built 1791) under Captain H. Kaas. They operated in the Caribbean, where Jessen also participated in battles against privateers. In 1795, Jessen was second-in-command of the frigate Thetis. For at least part of the period 1795 to 1799 Thetis was active in the Mediterranean protecting Danish shipping interests. Although Thetis was not present at the battle of 16 May 1797, she had been at Tripoli before – with a bribe for the Bey – and later with a squadron. (Note: Thetis called frequently at Malta where her captain, Lorentz Fisker, had been nursed back to health by nuns some years previously, and who provided the officers' mess with specially baked cakes.) In 1799 and 1800 Jessen was second in command of the Naval Academy, and later served in a cutter in Norwegian waters protecting the country's neutrality. As captain of Lougen he again sailed to the West Indies. There he also had the schooners Iresine and Den Aarvaagne under his command. On 1 September 1800 he captured the British privateer Eagle, which had been raiding Danish merchant shipping.

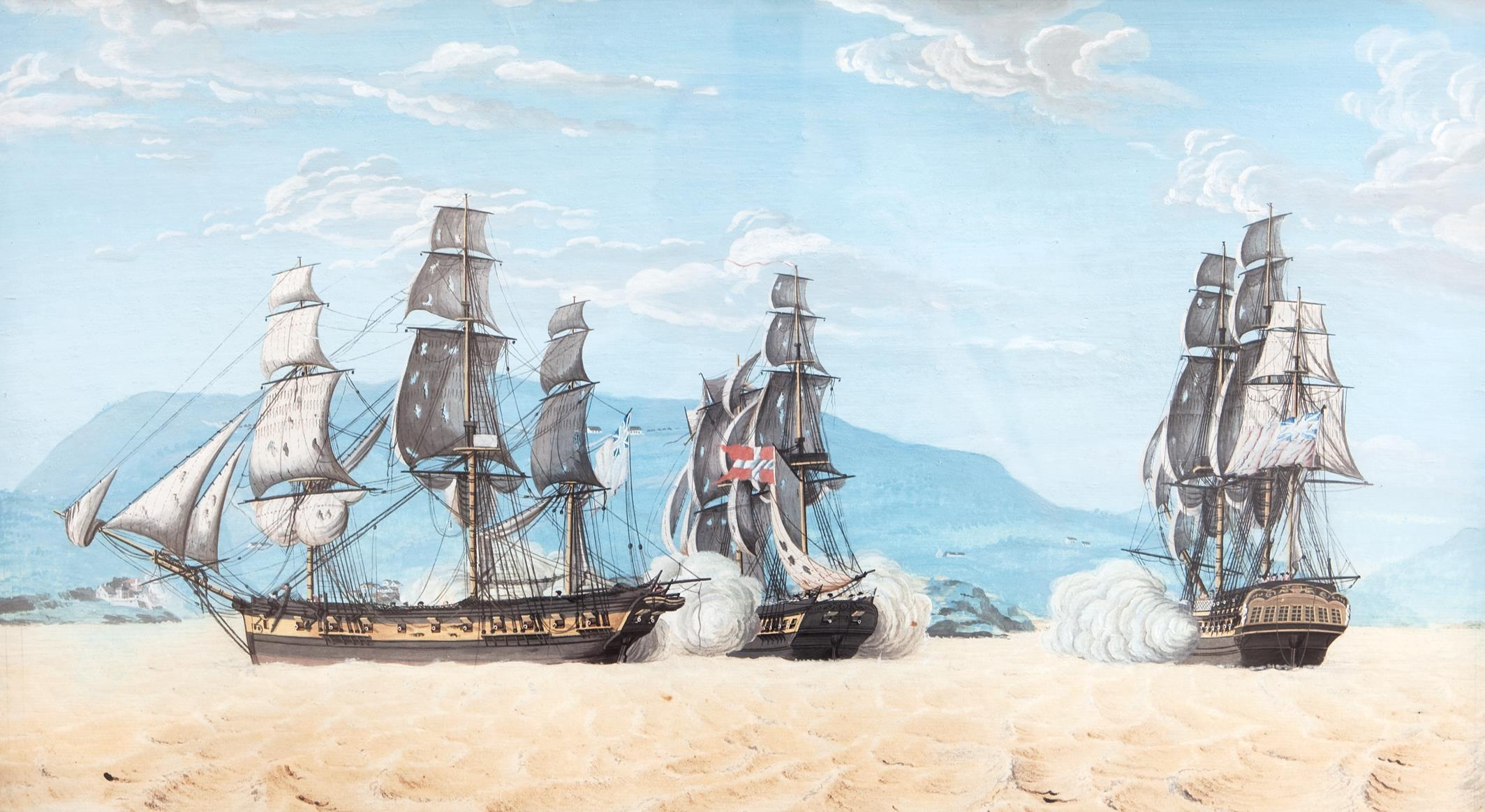
The Battle of West Kay

On 3 March 1801 he fought against HMS Arab and a privateer, Experiment, which engaged his ships – before Jessen knew anything about the outbreak of war – near the island of St Thomas. This was the ”Slaget ved Fugleklippen” or the Battle of West Kay. When the Danes surrendered the islands he had to surrender all three of his ships to the British and sailed home with them to Europe. Upon his return to Copenhagen King Christian VII bestowed on him a gold sword in recognition of his military service. In 1803–1804 he was again in the Danish West Indies, this time as captain of the (small) frigate Frederickssteen. Part of his remit was to act for the government of the Danish West Indies on all questions of naval service and maritime defence.

In 1807 Jessen became captain of the ship of the line Prinds Christian Frederick, which together with the ship of the line Louisa Augusta and the brig Lougen (built 1805), spent that year in Norwegian waters and thus avoided being captured by the British when they seized most of the Dano-Norwegian navy at the Battle of Copenhagen. In December 1807 Jessen returned to Øresund with 200 of his crew on the sick list, and with a ship that badly needed maintenance as it had been so long at sea. However, in March 1808 Jessen received orders to proceed to the Great Belt to chase away the British warships there, as the Danish government wanted to transfer Spanish troops in French service unhindered from Funen to Zealand. Meanwhile, in Copenhagen it was noted that a large British force had arrived off Hornbæk (north Zealand) so Admiral Bille sent Jessen written instructions to attempt to return to Øresund by sailing south around Zealand – but the message arrived too late. On 22 March 1808 he met two smaller British warships, HMS Quebec and HMS Lynx, and to prevent them entering the Great Belt he kept a northerly course. The British ships of the line off Hornbæk had meanwhile become aware of his departure and began searching for him the same day.

At 2 pm Prins Christian Frederick observed two British ships of the line approaching from the east, and Jessen realised that a decisive battle was at hand. The British ships of the line were Nassau and Stately, accompanied by Quebec and the brigs Lynx and Falcon. (Note: Nassau was one of the 13 ships the British captured at Copenhagen in 1801, and the only one they took back to Britain. They renamed her Nassau in 1805.) Jessen did not want to retreat before the British south through the Great Belt as he did not want to draw the British forces down there, so he kept course for the reef off Zealand Point – hoping to be able to slip past and back to Øresund. The wind was variable and failing, frustrating his plan. The battle commenced at 7:30 pm on the eastern side of Zealand Point. After nearly three hours fighting Jessen was forced to strike, but he was now so close to land that he could run his ship aground. Only in the nick of time did the British ships avoid grounding. In this sea battle, in addition to the 61 men killed and 129 wounded, the Danes lost three officers killed – one of them Lieutenant Peter Willemoes (a veteran of the 1801 Battle of Copenhagen). British losses were five killed and 44 wounded.

As the British could not manage to refloat Prins Christian Frederick, they set fire to her the next day. The Danish dead were buried in the churchyard at Odden, where an appropriate monument can still be found. Jessen, who was himself wounded in the fight, was taken to Gothenburg where he was exchanged, and where the British ships were repaired. For the rest of the war Jessen commanded the Trekroner Fort (at the northern approach to Copenhagen harbour), together with a division of gunboats. In 1815 Jessen sailed by private ship to the West Indies where in 1822, after his retirement from the Navy, he became Governor of St. Thomas. He remained Governor until his death on 30 March 1823.

== Personal life ==
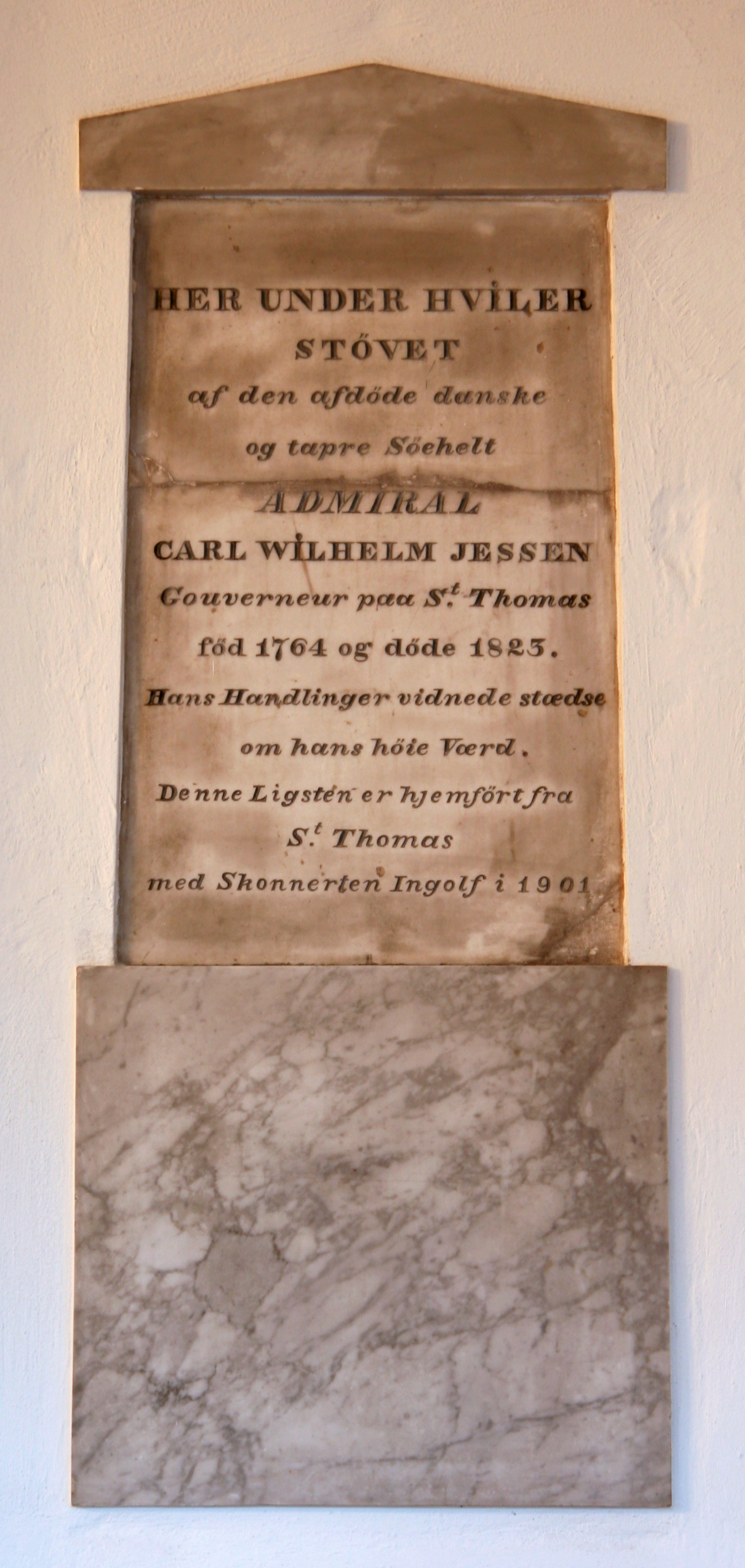
Jessen's epitaph in Holmens Church, Copenhagen.

On 27 August 1794, Jessen married Anne Margrethe Erichsen (8 December 1764 – 27 December 1845), daughter of senior civil servant (Note: The Danish word for his rank is konferensråd, indicating a person of the second rank of a five-rank scale. The rank is equivalent to that of a fully accredited ambassador, bishop or director of the National Bank.) Jon Erichsen. He was the elder brother of author and translator Juliane Marie Jessen. He was buried at St Thomas, where there is still a memorial, although his body was later disinterred and removed to the naval Holmens Cemetery in Copenhagen.

== Notes ==
- This article contains material translated from the Danish article: Carl Wilhelm Jessen
