= Andersons (1798 ship) =

History

Great Britain
- Name: Andersons
- Owner: 1798:John Anderson (later John & Alexander Anderson); 1808:Bolland; 1810:Teasdale
- Builder: Poole
- Launched: 1798
- Fate: Wrecked 1823 (Note: Weatherill gives the year of 1825, but that is clearly a mistake.)

General characteristics
- Tons burthen: 273 (bm)
- Length: 98 ft 6 in (30.0 m)
- Beam: 25 ft 7 in (7.8 m)
- Depth of hold: 12 ft 1 in (3.7 m)
- Complement: 1798:25; 1803:25; 1805:30
- Armament: 1798:14 × 6-pounder guns; 1803:12 × 4-pounder guns; 1805:14 × 4&9-pounder guns; 1815:6 × 18-pounder carronades
- Notes: Single deck with beams, & three masts

Andersons (or Anderson's, or Anderson) was launched at Poole in 1798. She then made seven voyages as a slave ship in the triangular trade in enslaved people. After the end of the British slave trade in 1807 her owners sold her to new owners who employed her as a West Indiaman. By 1810 she was registered in Whitby. She then served as a general merchant vessel until she was wrecked in 1823.

== Career ==
Andersen appeared in Lloyd's Register (LR) in 1798 with M.Morley, master, Anderson, owner, and trade Poole–Africa.

=== Enslaving voyage #1 (1798–1799) ===
Captain Mathew Morley he sailed from London on 31 October 1798. He received a letter of marque on 4 December. Andersons arrived at Demerara on 18 May 1799 and landed 404 captives. She arrived back at London on 28 August 1799.

=== Enslaving voyage #2 (1799–1800) ===
Captain Morley sailed from London on 28 November 1799, bound for West Africa. He acquired captives in the Sierra Leone estuary, and at Bance Island. Andersons arrived at Suriname on 10 June 1800 and landed 201 captives. She arrived back at London on 21 September 1800.

=== Enslaving voyage #3 (1800–1802) ===
Captain Morley sailed from London on 25 December 1800, bound for West Africa. Andersons acquired captives at Bance Island and arrived at British Guiana in December 1801. There she landed 279 captives. She arrived back at London on 30 March 1802.

=== Enslaving voyage #4 (1802–1803) ===
Captain Morley sailed from London on 30 July 1802. Andersons arrived at Grenada on 13 January 1803. There she landed 272 captives. She arrived back at London on 17 June 1803.

=== Enslaving voyage #5 (1803–1804) ===
War with France had resumed while Andersons was on her way back to London on her fourth voyage. Captain Morley acquired a new letter of marque on 19 October 1803, and sailed from London on 18 November. Andersons arrived at Grenada on 15 September 1804. There she landed c.280 captives. Andersons arrived back at London on 18 December.

=== Enslaving voyage #6 (1805–1806) ===
Captain James Findlay acquired a letter of marque on 26 August 1805. He sailed from London on 3 September. On 22 September she left St Helens, Isle of Wight, where Joseph Corry had joined her. She arrived at Funchal Roads on 12 October, having been convoyed by HMS Arab and Favourite. Andersons, under convoy by Favourite, left there on the 18th; they reached Gorée on 5 November, where Andersons delivered some cargo. They left on the 12th, and arrived at Bance Island on the 22nd.

Andersons acquired captives in the Sierra Leone estuary and Bance Island, and arrived with them at Kingston, Jamaica, on 18 June 1806. There she landed 265 captives. She arrived back at London on 28 August.

=== Enslaving voyage #7 (1807–1808) ===
Captain Mathew Morley initiated the voyage during which command changed to Wilkins, and then Findlay. Andersons left London on 2 February 1807 and gathered her slaves at Bance Island. She arrived at Kingston on 2 January 1808, where she landed 269 captives.

Lloyd's List reported on 26 June 1808 that she had had to put back to Kingston after leaving for London as she had been run foul of. She left Kingston on 20 May, and arrived back at London on 2 August. Captain Findlay died c.1809.

The Slave Trade Act 1807 abolished the slave trade within the British Empire, though not the possession of slaves.

=== West Indiaman ===
On Andersons return the Andersons sold her to Bolland, who employed her as a West Indiaman. The Register of Shipping for 1809 showed her master changing from J. Findlay to J. Anderson, her owner from Anderson to Bolland, and her trade from London–Africa to London–Hayti.

On 5 July 1810 Andersons, J. Anderson, commander, was offered for sale at Lloyd's Coffee House in a candle auction.

=== General trader ===
The Register of Shipping for 1811 gave a new master, Tisdale, a new owner, Captain & Co., and a new trade, Whitby–Quebec. In 1810 Andersons had changed her registry to Whitby and her owner to Mich. Teasdale & Co.

On 20 April 1811, a violent gale drove Anderson, Tait, master, onshore at Peterhead Bay. he had been sailing from London to Quebec. She was got off the shore and she then put into Peterhead. On 18 May, Andersons, Taite, master, put into Whitby. She had to put into Whitby after sustaining damage from grounding at Peterhead.

The Register of Shipping for 1815 showed Anderson with Rochester, master, Teasdale, owner, and trade, London transport.

On 12 November 1818 Anderson, Smith, master, arrived at Newcastle from Archangel. She put to sea on the 15th. She ran afoul of Friendship, Mills, master, and lost her bowsprit as well as sustaining other damage, but succeeded in reaching Hull.

The Register of Shipping for 1820 showed Anderson with J. Sayers, master, Teasdale, owner, and trade Hull to Nova Scotia.

Andersons, Teesdale, master, left Hull on 8 May 1820 and arrived at Quebec on 6 July with nine settlers.

== Fate ==
Andersons was wrecked on 16 December 1823 on the south coast of Bornholm, Denmark, while she was sailing from Saint Petersburg, Russia, to Whitby, Yorkshire. Her crew were rescued.
