= Ocean (1808 ship) =

History

United Kingdom
- Name: Ocean
- Owner: Atty & Co.
- Builder: Barrick, Whitby, England
- Launched: 1808

General characteristics
- Tons burthen: 435, or 43536/94, or 437, or 439
- Length: 116 ft (35.4 m)
- Beam: 29 ft 9 in (9.1 m)
- Propulsion: Sail

Ocean was built in 1808 at Whitby, England, that once carried settlers to South Africa and twice transported convicts to Australia.

== Career ==
Ocean appeared in the Register of Shipping (RS) in 1809 with Barrick, master and owner, and trade Whitby–London.

Lloyd's Register (LR) for 1818 showed Ocean with Remington, master, Attys, owner, and trade London–New South Wales. She had undergone a "good repair" in 1815.

=== First convict transport voyage (1817-1818) ===
Under the command of Samuel Remington she sailed from Spithead, England, on 21 August 1817, and arrived at Port Jackson on 10 January 1818. She transported 180 male convicts, none of whom died on the voyage.

Ocean left Port Jackson on 15 February bound for Batavia.

=== Voyage transporting settlers to South Africa in 1820 ===
In 1820 Ocean carried settlers from England to South Africa under the British Government's 1820 Settlers scheme. Captain Davis sailed from London on 13 December 1819 with 206 settlers. Ocean arrived at Table Bay, Cape Town, on 29 March 1820, and Algoa Bay, Port Elizabeth, on 15 April.

=== Second convict transport voyage (1823-1824) ===
Under the command of William Harrison, Ocean sailed from Portsmouth on 24 April 1823, and arrived at Port Jackson on 27 August 1823. She transported 173 male convicts, six of whom died on the voyage.

Ocean left Port Jackson in February 1824 bound for London. While en route she encountered a large gale and she lost her live stock overboard. She also rescued the 36-man crew of the whaler Arab, before Arab sank. Ocean went to Saint Helena to undertake repairs and buy provisions. She arrived in London in 1825.

=== Later career ===
In 1828 her owners changed her registration to London. Lloyd's Register for 1829 still showed Atty as her owners. It gave her master as Dean, and her trade as London-Quebec. The Register of Shipping for 1830 showed her with Major, master, T.Ward, owner, and trade London–Sierra Leone.

However, the change of master and trade actually had changed in 1828. In late 1828 Ocean, Major, master, carried the missionary William Munro to Sierra Leone, where he died a year or so later.

Year	Master	Owner	Trade	Source
1833	Bacon	T.Ward	London–Quebec; London–Sierra Leone	RS; some repairs 1828 & 1832; zinc plating 1833
