= Juliane Marie Jessen =

Danish poet and translator

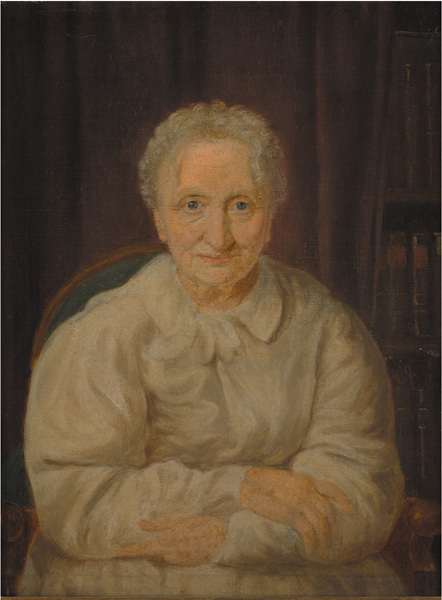
Portrait of Juliane Marie Jessen by Constantin Hansen, ca. 1830

Juliane Marie Jessen (11 February 1760 – 6 October 1832) was an early Danish female author and translator who became known in 1819 by winning first prize for the words she wrote for a national anthem for Denmark, with her Dannemark! Dannemark! – hellige Lyd! (Denmark, Denmark - holy sound), although it was never officially adopted. She also published other works including poetry and, in 1815, the play Ei blot til Lyst.

Jessen learned poetry from her uncle, Christian Frederik Jacobi. Beginning in 1787, she spent three years as a reader for Queen Juliana Maria until ill health intervened. Thereafter she educated young girls. Her most notable literary works are the play Ei blot til Lyst (1815) and the anthology Smaae Mark-Violer plantede i Danmarks Digterhauge (1819).

She lived in Smallegade in Copenhagen, where several famous artists were her neighbours. At her death in 1832 in Copenhagen, she was hailed as a noble, affectionate woman with "a powerful soul and cheerfully bright disposition".
