= Battle of Zealand Point =

1808 naval battle of the Gunboat War

- Part of the Gunboat War
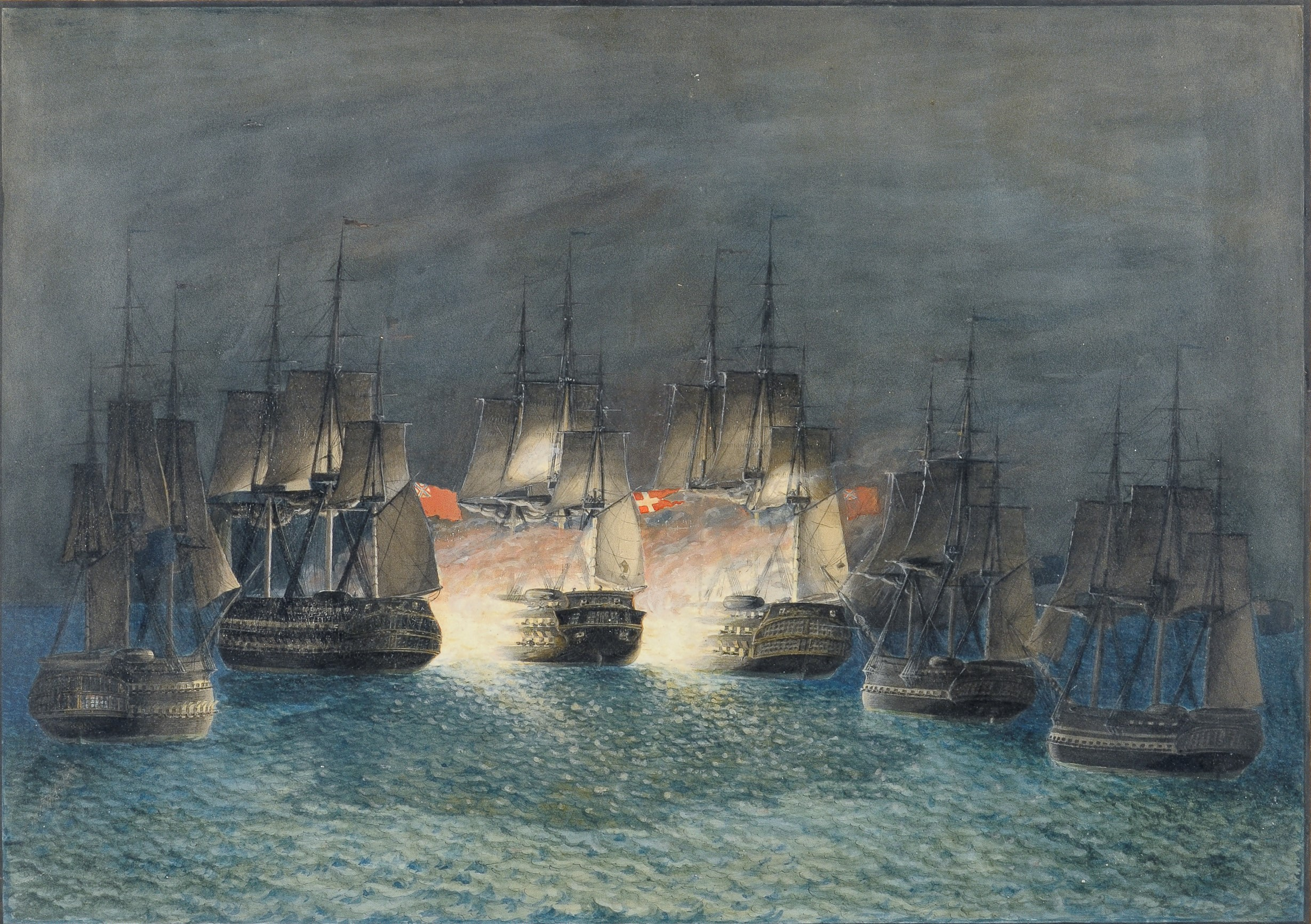
- Painting of the battle
| Date | 22 March 1808 |
| Location | Off Zealand, Kattegat |
| Result | British victory |

Belligerents
| United Kingdom | Denmark–Norway |

Commanders and leaders
| George Parker | Carl Wilhelm Jessen (surrendered) |

Strength
| 3 ships of the line 1 frigate | 1 ship of the line |

Casualties and losses
| 5 killed 48 wounded 1 missing | 55 killed 88 wounded 1 ship of the line destroyed |

The Battle of Zealand Point was fought off Zealand on 22 March 1808 during the Gunboat War. Three ships of the line and one frigate of the Royal Navy intercepted and destroyed a Danish ship of the line. The British victory in the battle resulted in the loss of the Danish navy's last ship of the line.

== Background ==
The Dano-Norwegian ship of the line HDMS Prinds Christian Frederik was stationed in Kristiansand, Norway from 7 August 1807, patrolling waters between Norway and Denmark where Britain had imposed a blockade. In February 1808, Prins Christian Frederik pursued the British ship HMS Quebec into hiding. Having learned of the Danish ship, the British admiralty sent a squadron consisting of HMS Nassau (the former Danish ship-of-the-line Holsteen, taken during the Battle of Copenhagen), HMS Stately, HMS Vanguard, and two brigs, HMS Constant and HMS Kite, to secure the waters. While this was going on Prins Christian Frederik became frozen in at Fredericksværn, near Kristiansand. She therefore did not set sail for Denmark until 4 March.

By the time Prins Christian Frederik reached Denmark, epidemic typhus had broken out among her crew. Ice in the Danish harbours prevented her from docking, and crew were replaced over the ice. On 17 March morale deteriorated further when news arrived that King Christian had died. She was ordered into the Great Belt (Storebælt) strait to provide cover for a crossing of a French army corps consisting of Spanish soldiers ordered by Jean Baptiste Jules Bernadotte (later King of Sweden) to attack Skåne. Having been alerted to the Danish plan, the British ships give chase. The British ships intended to outmanoeuvre, corner, and overpower Prins Christian Frederik; Captain Carl Jessen, after conferring with his officers, decided to take a stand in order to gain enough of a tactical advantage to move into familiar waters and within the protective range of the cannon at Kronborg.

On Friday 18 March 1808 the crew of HMS Stately was employed cutting passages through the sea ice from their Swedish anchorage to allow Stately and Nassau to go to sea. Their Swedish pilots were discharged the next day when the squadron, comprising the three ships-of-the-line Nassau, Stately, and Vanguard, the frigate HMS Quebec , the two sloops Falcon and HMS Lynx, and the gunbrig Constant, formed up and live bullocks were transferred from Stately to Quebec and to Lynx. The smaller ships patrolled the northern approaches to the Great Belt and the Øresund, within sight of the squadron or separately, investigating any strange sail. Quebec and Lynx were in company late on 21 March, then parted company early on 22nd before Quebec identified Prins Christian Frederik near Sejerø. Lynx, and later HMS Falcon, joined with Quebec in Sejerø Bay.55.8833°N 11.1500°E

== Battle ==
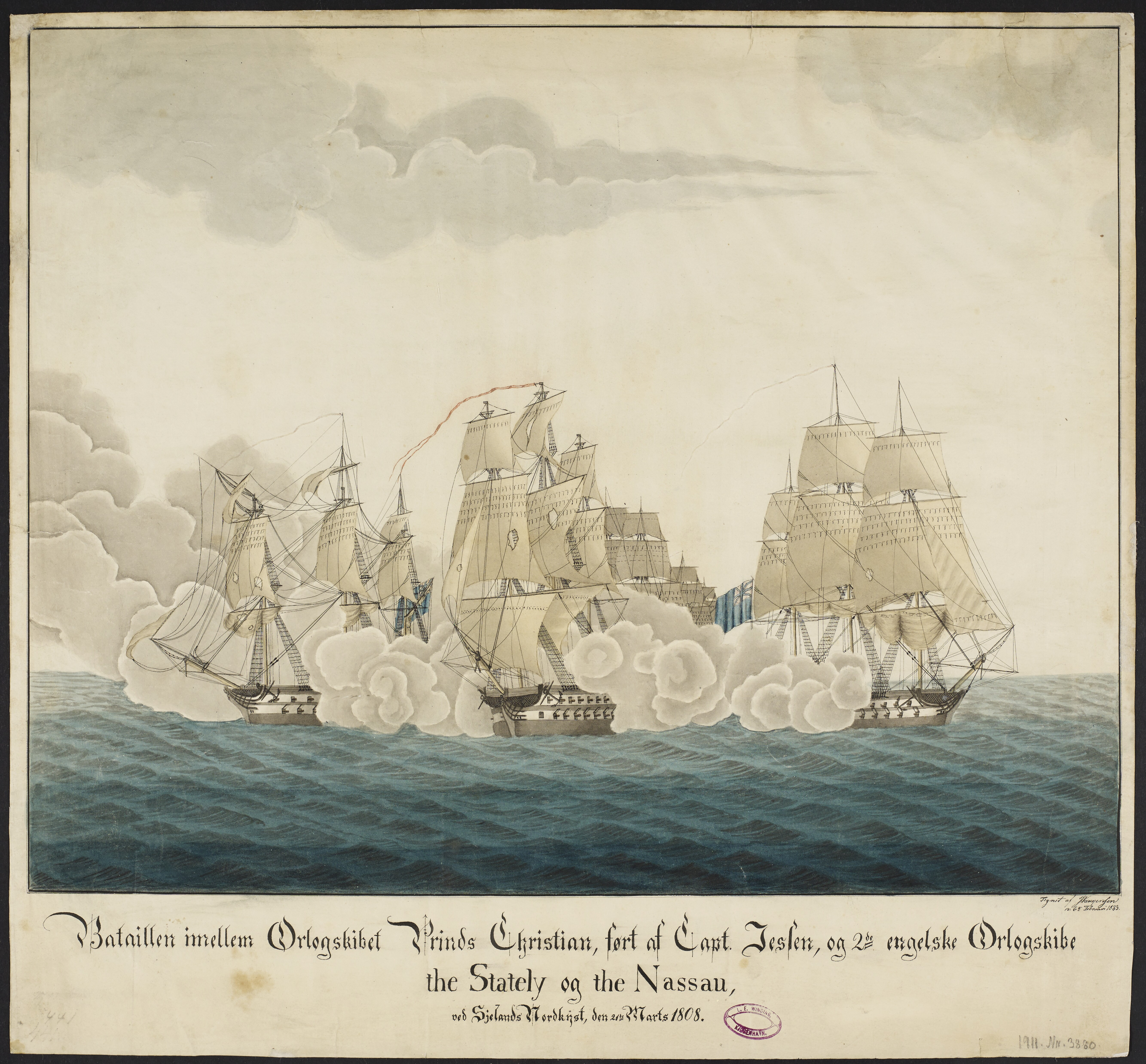
Illustration of the battle

In the hours before the battle Prins Christian Frederik was within sight of Quebec and Lynx. At 2 [pm] the sloop, Falcon, who recorded the signal from Quebec "Danish Line-of-battle-ship to windward", joined them and cleared for action. During the afternoon the Danish ship had reversed course and sailed northward round the reef at the west of Sjællands Odde (that long tongue of land at the northwest of Zealand), and was now headed eastward again, to the north of the land. Shortly after 4 [pm] Stately and Nassau were sighted to the North East, (Note: These two ships had sailed westward during 22 March, having left Vanguard and the gunbrig Constant near the approaches to Øresund.) and the signal, "inforced with a (signal) gun", of the presence of the enemy led to all ships making "all sail, in chace".

Falcon and Nassau's logs record that at 7:50pm Prinds Christian Frederik fired the first shots when she fired her stern chasers at Nassau, the foremost of her pursuers. By 8:05pm Nassau had drawn level and began returning broadsides, but forty minutes later she was in danger of blocking Stately's field of fire. Nassau made more sail and moved ahead out of the way as Stately entered the fray. Action continued with the two British ships-of-the-line alternating their attacks until Prinds Christian Frederik struck. At this point Prinds Christian Frederik was aground 300 meters from the shore at 55.9835°N 11.3362°E.

Throughout the morning of 23 March the squadron's boats transported prisoners, and the ships' companies knotted, spliced, and ran new rigging. At noon, orders were sent to set fire to Prinds Christian Frederick as soon as all the wounded had been removed. The fire was set between 7:30 and 8:00pm and Prinds Christian Frederik blew up shortly before 9:00 pm.

== Aftermath ==
Stately had four men killed, and 31 officers and men wounded. Nassau lost one man killed, 17 officers and men wounded, and one man missing. Prins Christian Frederik lost 55 men killed and 88 men wounded. In 1847 the Admiralty awarded the Naval General Service Medal with clasps "Stately 22 March 1808" and "Nassau 22 March 1808" to any still surviving crew members of those vessels that chose to claim them. Prins Christian Frederik was the last of the Danish ships of the line during the Napoleonic Wars.

Peter Willemoes and the other Danish casualties were after the battle buried in a communal grave at Odden churchyard, near the scene of the Battle of Zealand Point, where their gravestone can still be seen. A monument commemorating the battle and the Danish casualties was also erected in the churchyard. It consists of a Neoclassical column featuring a plaque with an incidental poem by N.F.S. Grundtvig ('De snekker de mødtes i kvæld på hav'). A commemorative stone with a relief of a crowned anchor and an inscription has been erected on the beach.

Odsherred Museum hosts a small display about the battle. It includes the anchor, a cannon and a number of other artefacts from Prinds Christian Frederik. A model of the ship hangs in Odden Church. Christian Mølsted has painted a somewhat romanticised scene from the battle in which Willemoes is dying in the arms of second in command C. A. Rothe. It exists in two versions, one in Museum Vestfyn (1901) and one in the Frederiksborg Museum in Hillerød.

== Gallery ==
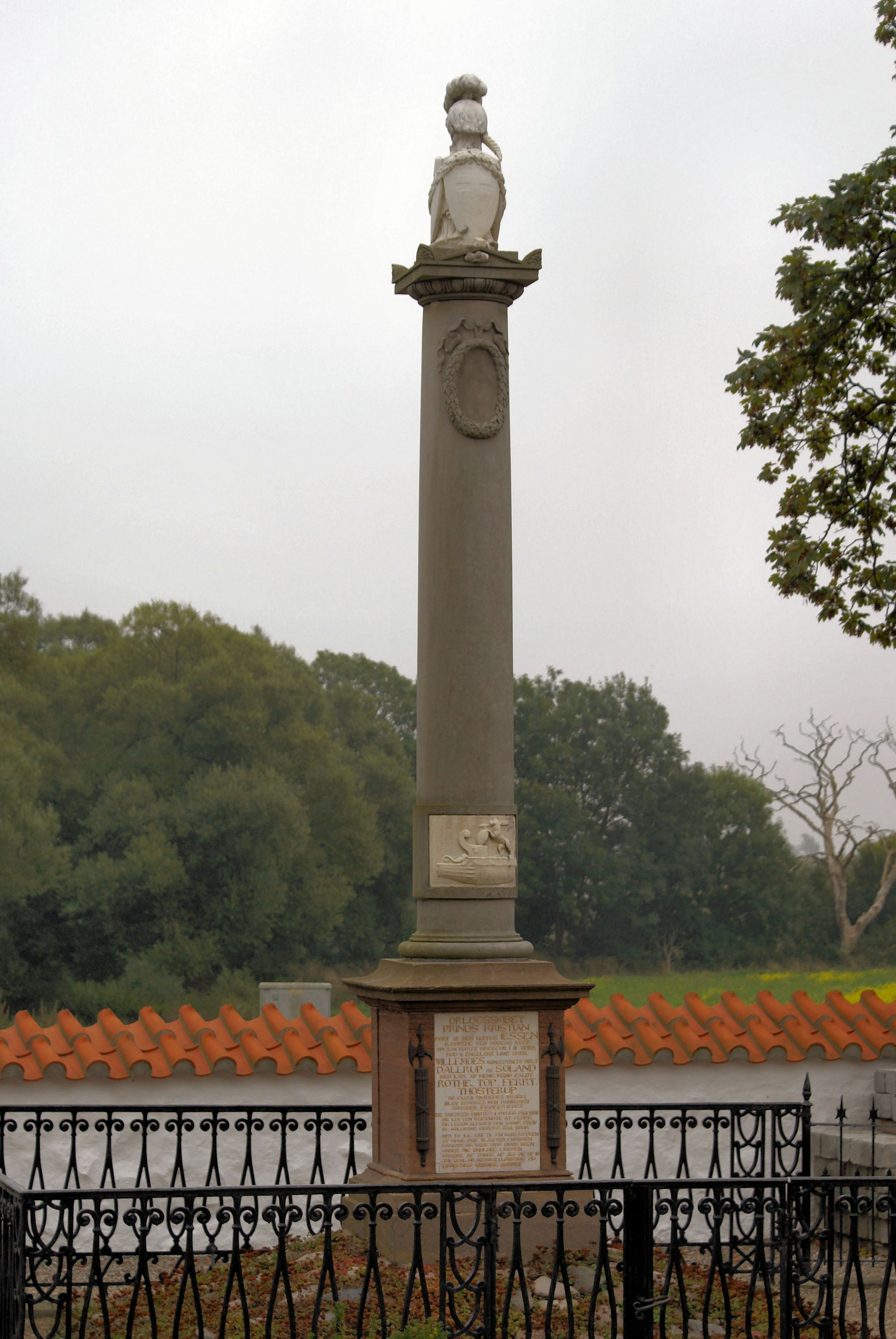
Memorial in Odden churchyard

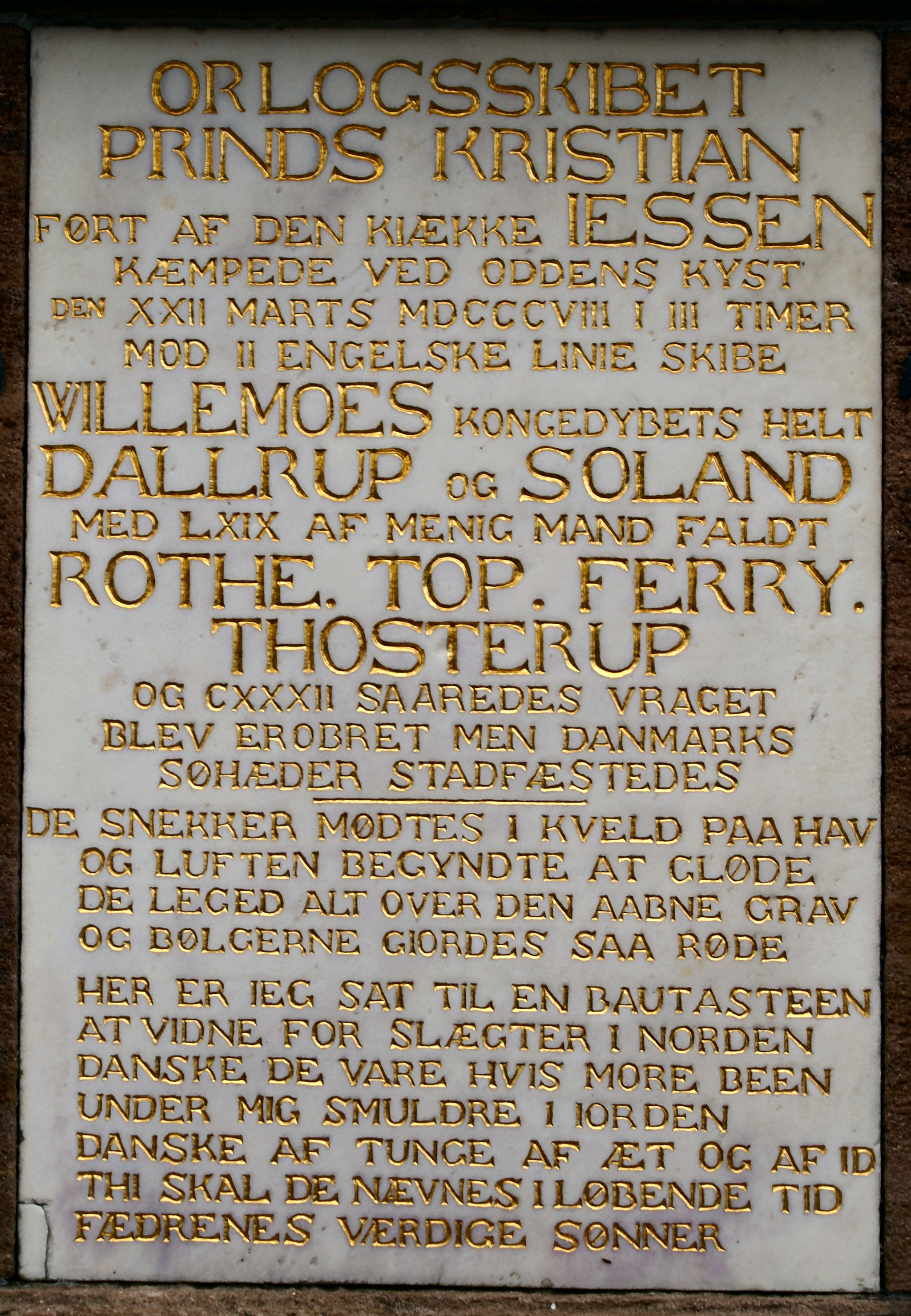
Close-up of the plaque on the memorial in Odden churchyard

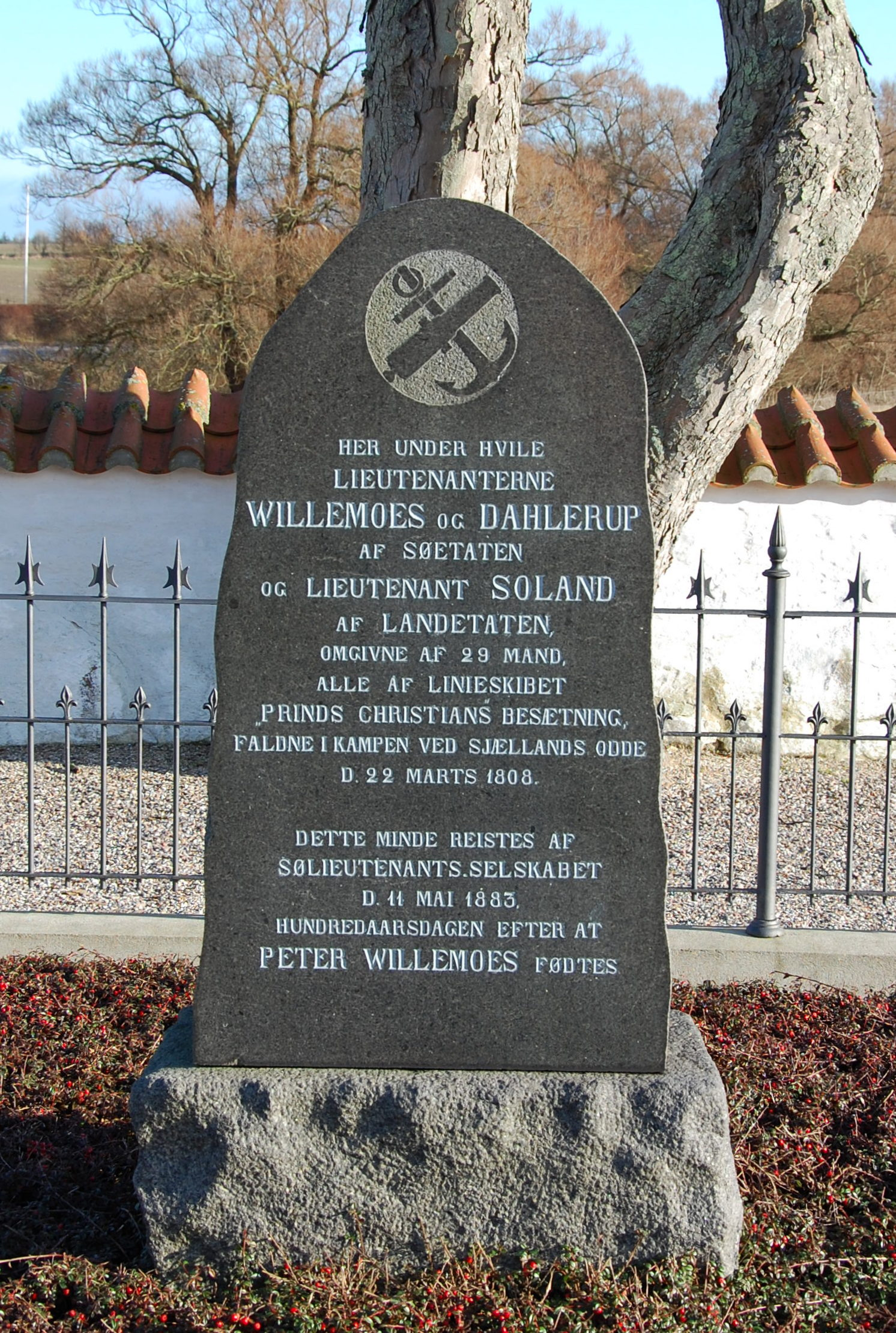

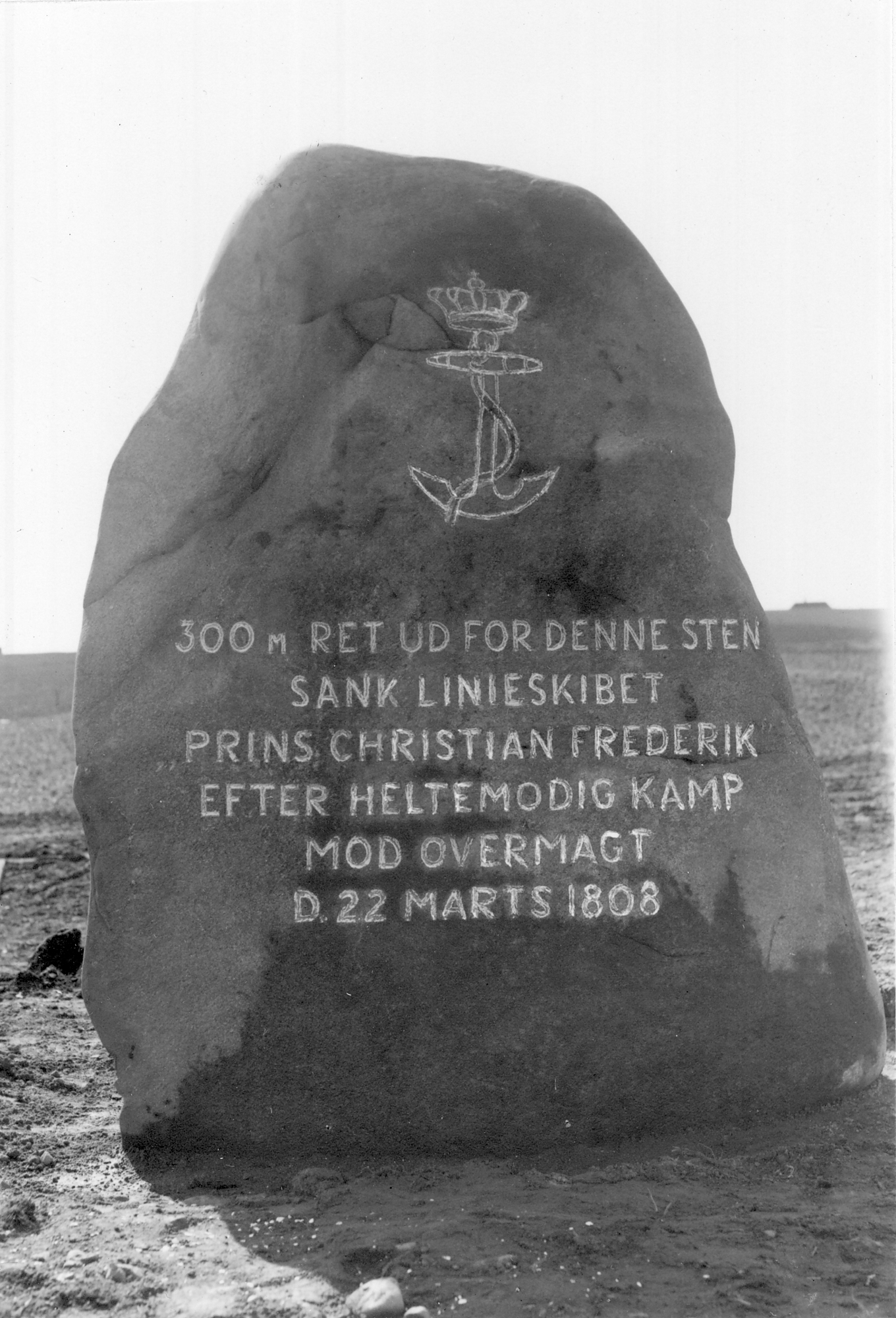
Danish Commemorative stone for the Battle of Zealand Point

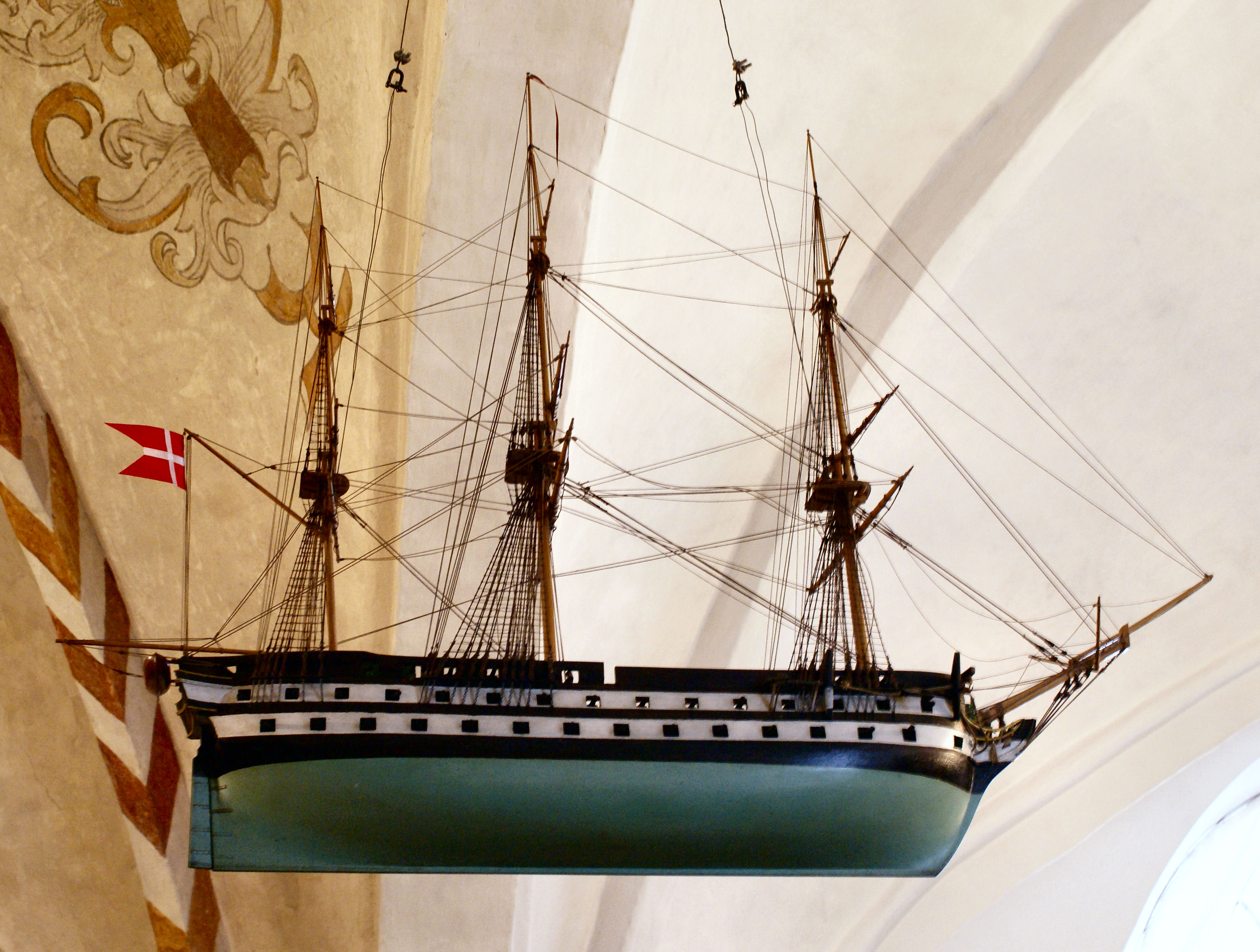
A model of this ship hangs in da:Odden Kirke, near the scene of the battle
