= HMS Arab (1798) =

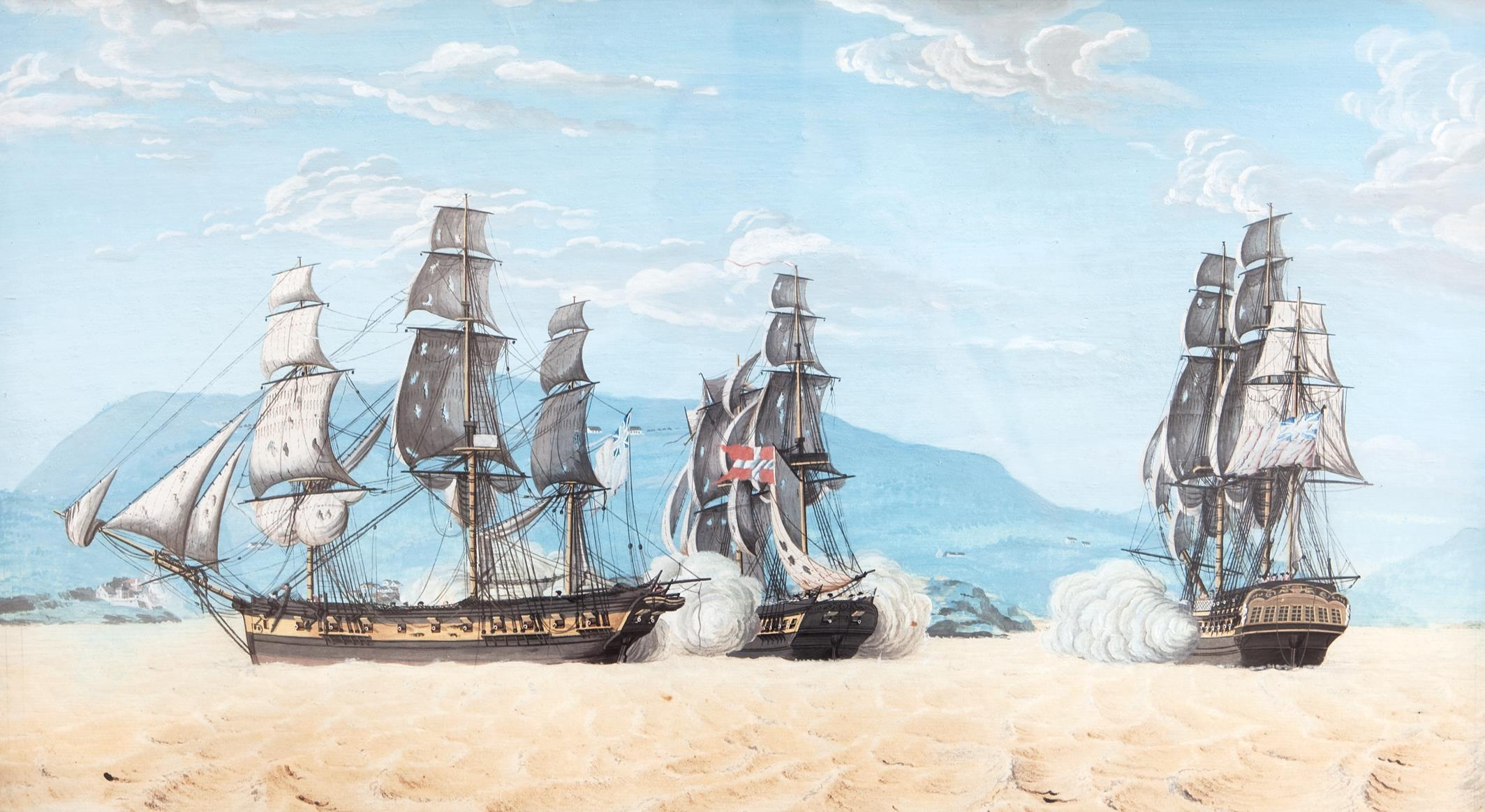
- Arab at the Battle of West Kay

History

France
- Name: Brave
- Owner: Benoit Boucard (part-owner) (Note: Boucard invested in a Brave, of "600 tons", in 1797-8 at Nantes. It is almost surely the same vessel as this Brave.)
- Builder: Nantes, France
- Launched: c.June 1797
- Captured: 24 April 1798

Great Britain
- Name: HMS Arab
- Acquired: 1798 by purchase
- Commissioned: 1798
- Fate: Sold on 20 September 1810

United Kingdom
- Name: Arab
- Owner: 1810–1813: Mather and Co.; 1813–1824: Daniel Bennett
- Acquired: 1810 by purchase
- Fate: Sank June 1824

General characteristics
- Class & type: 22-gun sixth rate post ship
- Displacement: 400 unladen/700 laden tons (French)
- Tons burthen: 489 or 500, or 505 48/94 (bm)
- Length: Overall: 109 ft 11 in (33.5 m), or; Overall:114 ft 4 in (34.8 m); Keel: 88 ft 10 in (27.1 m)
- Beam: 32 ft 8 1/2 in (9.970 m), or 32 ft 6 in (9.91 m)
- Depth of hold: 14 ft 3 in (4.34 m)
- Sail plan: Full-rigged ship
- Complement: Brave: 235; HMS Arab: 155
- Armament: Brave:18 × 12 & 18-pounder guns (Note: Brave's guns came from the Fonderie de l'Indret, which supplied guns to vessels fitting out at Nantes.); HMS Arab: 20 × 9-pounder guns + 2 × 32-pounder carronades
- Notes: Two decks and three masts

HMS Arab was a 22-gun post ship of the Royal Navy. She was formerly the 18-gun French privateer Brave, which the British captured in 1798. She served during the French Revolutionary and Napoleonic Wars until she was sold in 1810.

During her 12-year career with the Royal Navy she served on three separate stations, and was involved in two international incidents. The first incident occurred under Captain John Perkins and involved the Danes. The second incident occurred under Captain Lord Cochrane and involved the Americans. She participated in the capture of Sint Eustatius and Saba. Under Captains Perkins and Maxwell she also took a considerable number of prizes.

After the Royal Navy sold her in 1810 she served as a whaling ship in the South Seas whale fisheries. She made six complete whaling voyages until she was lost in 1824 during her seventh; all her crew were saved.

== French origins and capture ==
Brave was built in Nantes circa June 1797. She was commissioned under Joseph Robin, and had a crew of 160 men.

On 24 April 1798 the 36-gun Phoenix, under the command of Captain Lawrence William Halsted, captured Brave off Cape Clear. She was pierced for 22 guns and was carrying eighteen, mixed 12 and 18-pounders. Unusually for a privateer, Brave resisted capture, suffering several men killed and 14 wounded before she surrendered. Phoenix had no casualties and suffered trifling damage to her sails and rigging. Brave had a crew of 160 men and also some 50 English prisoners on board, none of whom were injured. Halsted described Brave as being "a very fine ship, of 600 Tons, is coppered, and sails exceedingly fast." That she had 50 prisoners on board and only 160 crew indicates that she had taken several British vessels and then put prize crews on board her prizes.

== French Revolutionary Wars and Treaty of Amiens ==
After Phoenix captured Brave, the British brought her to Plymouth, where she arrived on 12 May. She was named and registered on 24 July 1798 and fitted out between November 1798 and April 1799. During this period a lower deck, quarterdeck and a forecastle were added. She was commissioned as HMS Arab in December 1798 under Commander Peter Spicer. (Note: Spicer had been a lieutenant on HMS Captain under Horatio Nelson at the Battle of Cape St Vincent.)

=== Capel ===
On 5 January 1799 Captain Thomas Bladen Capel took command of Arab, sailing for Jamaica on 23 April. After arriving in the West Indies, at about midnight on 10 July, she engaged three Spanish frigates off the coast of Havana for about half an hour, losing three of the crew to enemy fire though apparently giving as good as she got thus causing the Spanish to withdraw. It was also during late June and early July 1799 that there was a serious outbreak of yellow fever on board, something from which ten of the Ship's company would die, including its carpenter Jeremiah Driscoll. The journal of the ship's surgeon, Thomas Tappen, contains an interesting and detailed account of the symptoms these men experienced, together with his treatment for the fever, including the use of bloodletting and the administering of calomel.

On 23 August, Quebec shared with Arab in the capture of the American ship Porcupine, a brig of 113 tons with a crew of eight men that was sailing from New York to Havana carrying a cargo wine, oil, soap and sundries. Porcupine was condemned but Quebec appealed.

During this period Arab on her own also detained, on suspicion, the Spanish brig Esperansa, which was sailing from Carthagena with a cargo of cotton, hides, and so forth. Later, at sea off Cape Canaveral on 11 October, lightning struck Arab, killing three men and splitting her main top mast. Tappen again recorded things in his journal, including the state of one of the men, John Leggett, "whose side had the appearance of being burnt, the skin all peeled off, tho the shirt remained entire ". Before the year was out another severe outbreak of yellow fever struck Arab whilst she was in Jamaica, and by the following January a further twelve of the crew were dead.

=== Perkins ===
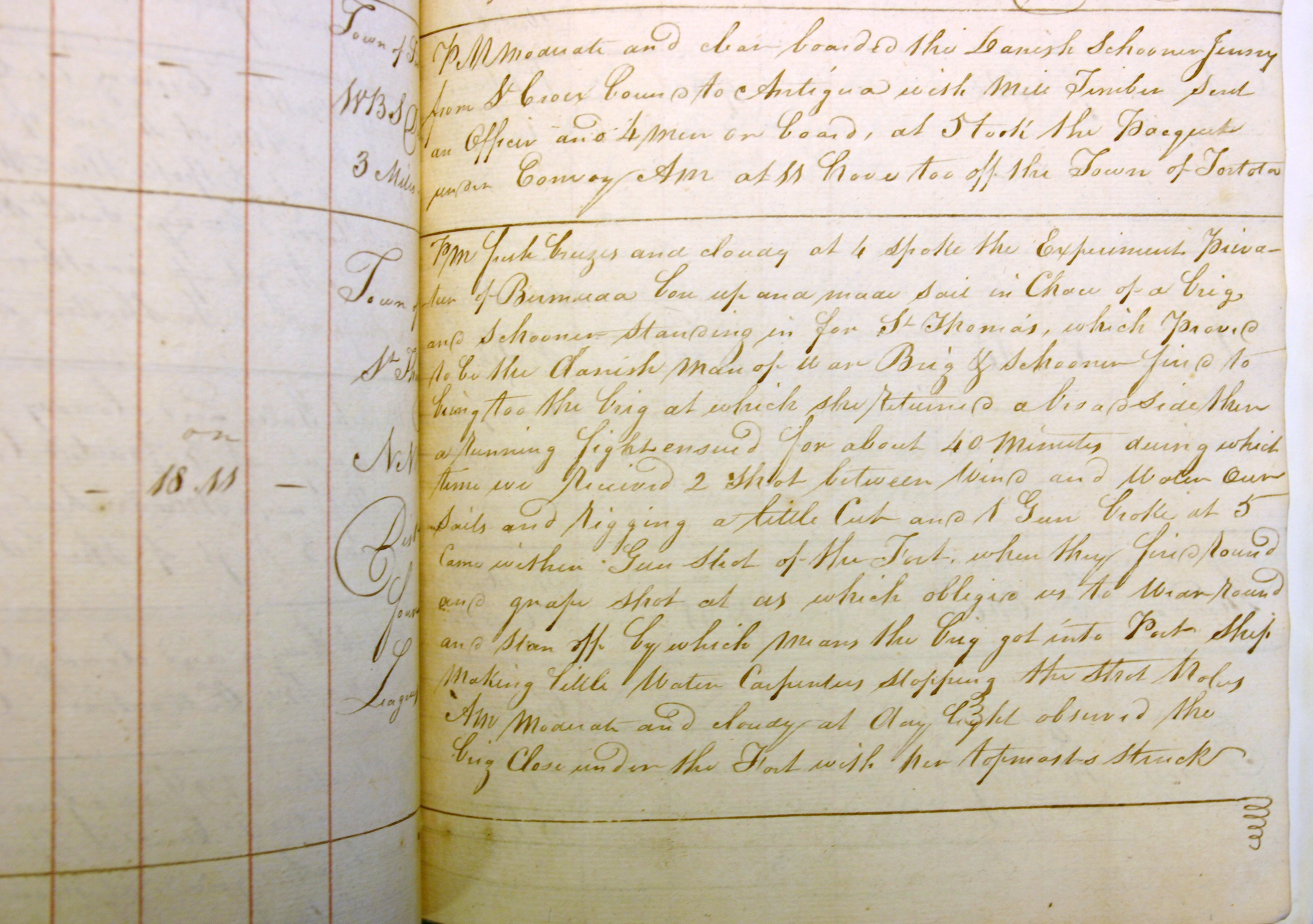
An extract from the logbook of Arab

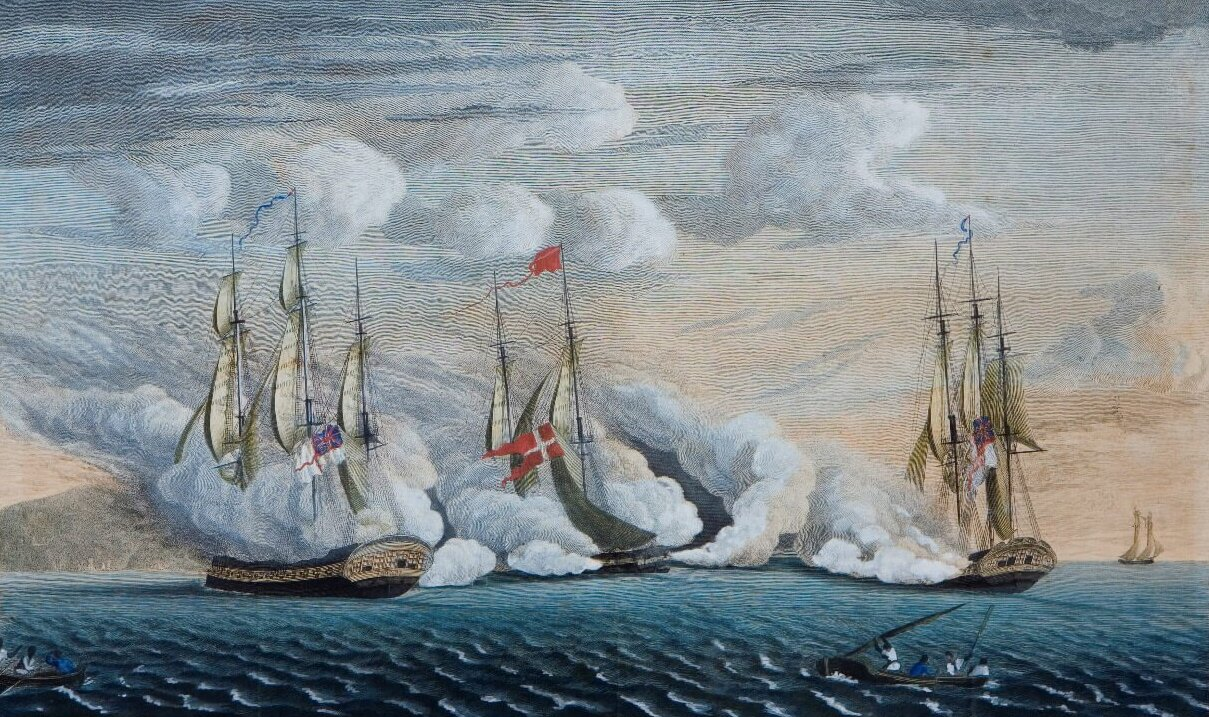
Aquatint engraving of the Battle of West Kay

Captain John Perkins took command in January 1801. In early 1801 rumours of a diplomatic rift between Britain and Second League of Armed Neutrality started reaching the Caribbean. On 1 March Perkins received orders to stop all Danish, Swedish and Russian ships that he encountered. Two days later Arab, in company with the 18-gun British privateer Experiment, caught and challenged two Danish vessels, the brig Lougen, under the command of Captain Carl Wilhelm Jessen, and the schooner Den Aarvaagne. (Note: The name Den Aarvaagne translates as "The Alert" or "The Watchman".) Arab approached the two Danish vessels and, according to Danish accounts, without warning, fired several broadsides at Lougen before the Danish ship was able to return fire. Lougen, which had escaped serious damage, began to return fire steadily. Experiment initially attempted to capture Aarvaagne, but Aarvaagne obeyed orders to stay out of the fight and instead escaped south to Christiansted on St. Croix with its intelligence on British actions. Experiment then joined Arab in the attack on Lougen, with the two British ships sandwiching the Danish ship. During the engagement, which lasted for over an hour, one of Lougen's shots struck the Arab's cathead and loosed the bower anchor. (Perkin's reported that it was the first shot from Lougen that loosed the bower anchor.) Arab's crew was unable to cut the anchor free, leaving Arab unable to manoeuvre effectively. This allowed Jessen to steer a course that brought him under the protection of the shore batteries and then into St Thomas.

The Danish government awarded Jessen a presentation sword made of gold, a medal and 400 rixdollars (the equivalent of a whole year's salary) for his actions in escaping from a numerically superior force. Still, Perkins, after having repaired his battle damage, cruised outside the harbour and in a two-week period captured more than a dozen Danish and other foreign vessels.

Between 15 March and 7 April 1801, an expedition under Lieutenant-General Thomas Trigge and Admiral Duckworth captured the islands of St. Bartholomew, St. Martin, St. Thomas, and St. Croix. Arab was listed among the vessels participating in the expedition and entitled to a share in the "proceeds of sundry articles of provisions, merchandise, stores, and property afloat" that had been captured. At that time the British seized both Lougen and Den Aarvaagne.

On 13 April Arab captured the Spanish armed schooner Duenda.

On 16 April 1801 Perkins, in Arab and the newly captured Duenda, together with Colonel Richard Blunt and a detachment of the Buffs (Royal East Kent Regiment), laid siege to and captured the wealthy islands of Sint Eustatius and Saba, capturing their French garrisons, forty-seven cannon and 338 barrels of gunpowder. Eustatia had been the most profitable of the islands in the Dutch West Indies.

Command of Arab passed to Captain Robert Fanshawe in 1802. Fanshawe took her back to Plymouth, where she spent between August and December being repaired and refitted. After a brief period spent laid up she was brought back into service with the resumption of war with France.

== Napoleonic Wars ==
=== Cochrane ===
Arab was recommissioned in October 1803 under Captain Lord Cochrane, who had been assigned to Arab by Earl St Vincent. In his autobiography, Cochrane compared the Arab to a collier, and his first thoughts on seeing her being repaired at Plymouth were that she would "sail like a haystack". Under Cochrane's command Arab twice collided with Royal Navy ships, first with the 12-gun HMS Bloodhound, and then with the storeship HMS Abundance.

Despite his misgivings, Cochrane still managed to intercept and board an American merchant ship, the Chatham, thereby creating an international incident that led to the consignment of Arab and her commander to fishing fleet protection duties beyond Orkney in the North Sea, an assignment that Cochrane bitterly complained about. Cochrane would later refer to his time in the Arab in the North Sea and the Downs as "naval exile in a dreary tub".

=== Maxwell ===
Captain Keith Maxwell replaced Cochrane in 1805, and sailed Arab to serve with the squadron off Boulogne. On 18 July the British spotted the French Boulogne flotilla sailing along the shore. Captain Edward Owen of Immortalité sent Calypso, Fleche, Arab and the brigs Watchful, Sparkler, and Pincher in pursuit of 22 large schooners flying the Dutch flag. As Maxwell came close to shore he found the water barely deep enough to keep Arab from running aground. Still, the British managed to force three of the schooners to ground on the Banc de Laine near Cap Gris Nez; their crews ran two others ashore. The British also drove six French gun-vessels on shore. However, the bank off Cape Grinez, and the shot and shells from the right face of its powerful battery, soon compelled the British to move back from the shore. Arab suffered seven wounded and a great deal of damage. Fleche was the closest inshore owing to her light draft of water; she had five men severely wounded and damage to her rigging.

At some point a shell from a shore battery hit Arab's main-mast-head and then fell to the gun deck. At first a seaman named Clorento tried to defuse the shell. While he was doing this master's mate Edward Mansell and two more seamen came up. Together they got the shell into the sea, where it exploded. The next day Arab buried her dead at sea, after which the men on Immortalite cheered Arab. Maxwell wrote to the Patriotic Fund at Lloyd's, drawing its attention to the heroism of the four men. Thereafter, the Fund voted Mansell £50 and the three other seamen £20 each. The fund gave an additional £125 for Maxwell to divide between eight other crewmen in graduated amounts.

On 22 September 1805 she left St Helens, Isle of Wight. She arrived at Funchal Roads on 12 October, having with Favourite, convoyed the slave ship Andersons and some other vessels.

In December Arab and Favourite were off the west coast of Africa. Subsequently, Arab returned to the West Indies. During her time in the West Indies Lieutenant Edward Dix, as acting captain, temporarily replaced Maxwell for a period of five weeks in 1806. Two days after Dix joined Arab, yellow fever broke out which the crew of Arab, except Dix and eight others, contracted; 33 men died. Maxwell resumed command and returned to Spithead in 1807 where Arab's remaining crew were paid off.

=== Disposal ===
The Navy then placed Arab in ordinary at Woolwich. The principal officers and commissioners of His Majesty's Navy sold her at Deptford on 20 September 1810.

== Whaler ==
The supplement to Lloyd's Register for 1811 describes Arab, 500 tons, French prize, at London, Hill, master, and the whaling company Mather & Co. as owner. However, there is no record that she sailed for Mather & Co. Arab did engage in whaling and sealing voyages from 1813 until she was lost in 1824, but for Daniel Bennett.

An addendum to the entry for Arab in the 1813 Lloyd's Register gave her new master as "Brown". This is John Brown. Ownership changed in 1813 and the new owner was Daniel Bennett, who would remain Arab's owner for seven voyages.

On her first voyage for Bennett, Brown sailed Arab to the South Seas whale fisheries on 22 September 1813. He visited the Desolation Islands, returning to London on 23 June 1815.

Arab and Brown then sailed for the South Seas again on 26 June 1815. She returned on 21 May 1816 with 580 casks and 25 cases of seal skins.

For her next three voyages for Bennett, Arab's master was George Barclay (or Berkley). For her third voyage, Arab left London on 4 July 1816, and returned on 19 March 1817.

On her fourth voyage, Arab left London on 10 June 1817. She returned on 27 March 1818 with 600 casks.

On her fifth voyage, Arab left on 2 June 1818, bound for South Georgia She returned on 6 May 1819 with 300 casks and 5000 seal skins.

Arab's master for sixth voyage was Allen, and her destination was Walvis Bay. In March 1820 she was reported to have 1800 barrels. By 14 August she was back at Walfish [Walvis] Bay. She sailed for England, but on 24 October she was reported to grounded on Margate Sands. She was refloated and reached London on 27 October.

== Loss ==
For what was her seventh voyage, which turned out to be her last, Arab was under the command of Captain Alexander Sinclair. She left on 9 April 1821 for New Zealand. She was reported to be at the Bay of Islands and to have loaded 350 barrels. She left from "Fenning's Island" (possibly Fanning's Island), and by 11 June was in a sinking state with nine feet of water in her hold. Fortunately, she encountered Ocean, Harrison, master, at 57°S 77°E.

Ocean had left Port Jackson in February 1824 bound for London. While en route she weathered a large gale but she lost her livestock overboard. When she encountered Arab, she was able to rescue Arab's 36-man crew before Arab sank with her cargo of 300 tons of sperm oil. Ocean went on to Saint Helena to undertake repairs and buy provisions. Ocean arrived in London in July 1824.
