= HMS Endeavour (1781) =

History

Great Britain
- Name: HMS Endeavour
- Acquired: 1781
- Commissioned: October 1781
- Out of service: Before 1790

General characteristics
- Class & type: 14-gun schooner
- Tons burthen: 118 bm
- Length: 60 ft (18.3 m) (gundeck); 55 ft 6 in (16.9 m) (keel)
- Beam: 9 ft 6 in (2.9 m)
- Propulsion: Sails
- Sail plan: Fore-and-aft rig
- Armament: 14 × four-pounder guns

HMS Endeavour was a 14-gun fore-and-aft rigged schooner of the Royal Navy, purchased from private owners in 1782 to assist in the British military effort during the American Revolutionary War.

Endeavour's dimensions were small and light in keeping with other vessels of her class, with a gundeck length of 60 ft (18.3 m), beam of 9 ft 6 in (2.9 m) and 118 tons burthen. She was fitted after her purchase with 14 four-pounder guns.

Her purchase cost is unrecorded.

== Bibliography ==
- Winfield, Rif (2007). British Warships of the Age of Sail 1714–1792: Design, Construction, Careers and Fates. Seaforth. ISBN 9781844157006.
