= HDMS Lougen (1791) =

1791 ship

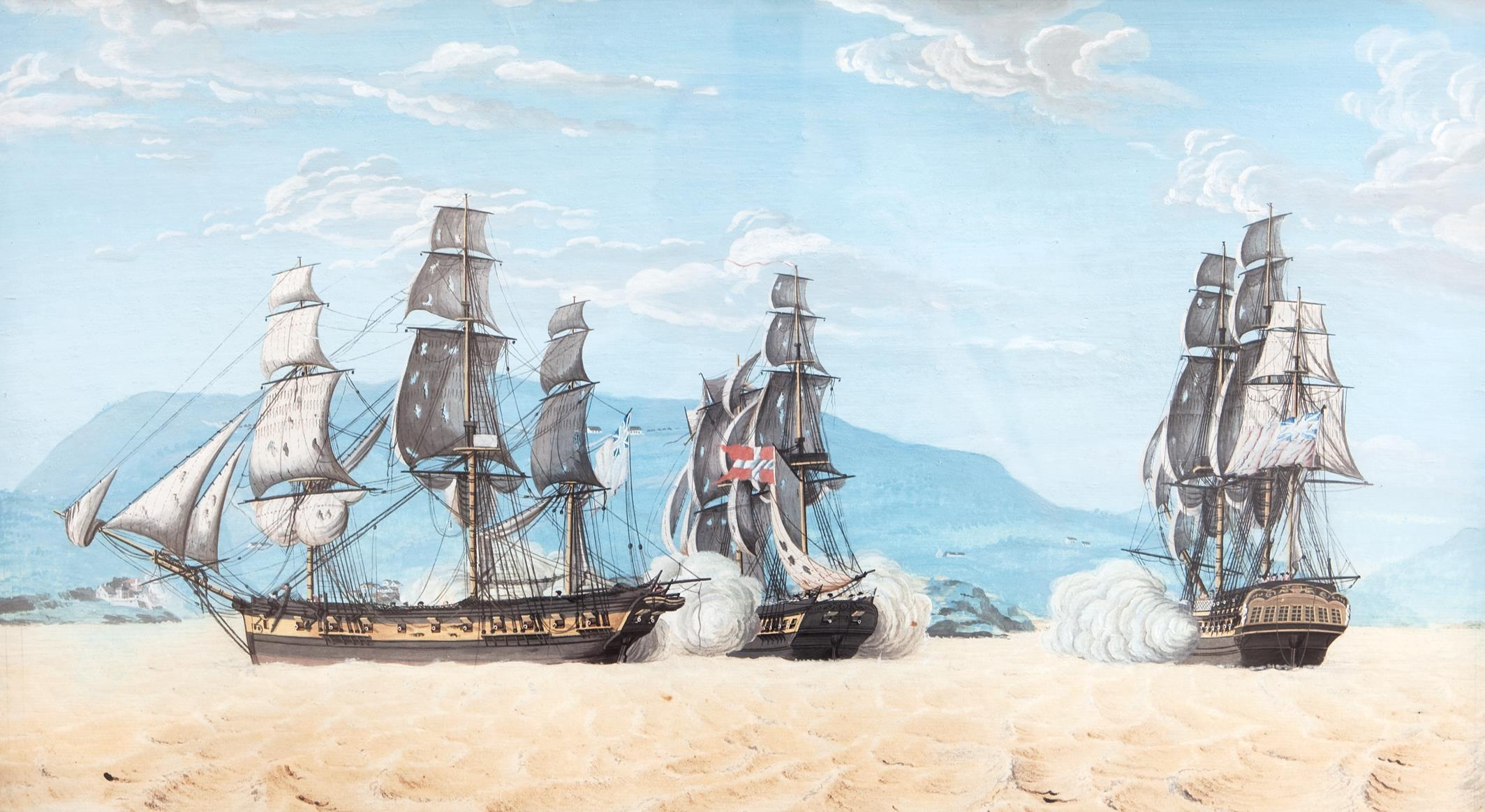
- Lougen (centre) at the Battle of West Kay

History

Denmark
- Name: Lougen
- Builder: Stibolt of Nyholm, Copenhagen
- Launched: 10 September 1791
- Commissioned: 1792
- Out of service: In dock during 1793, 1794, 1797 and 1800
- Fate: Broken up 1802
- Notes: First Danish ship to be copper clad (1793); Taken by the British in 1801 when capturing the Danish West Indies

General characteristics
- Class & type: Lougen-class brig-of-war
- Displacement: 169½ tons
- Length: 93 ft 6 in (28.50 m)
- Beam: 26 ft (7.9 m)
- Draught: 11 ft (3.4 m)aft; 10 ft forward
- Sail plan: Brig
- Complement: 85 men
- Armament: 18 × 18-pounder short cannon

HDMS Lougen was an 18-gun brig of the Royal Dano-Norwegian Navy. Launched in 1791, she was the lead ship of her class, designed by the shipwright Ernst Stibolt. She was the first Danish warship to be copper-sheathed. She was active protecting Danish merchant shipping and suppressing piracy in the Mediterranean and Caribbean. In March 1801, she fought off the British privateer Experiment and 22-gun post ship HMS Arab in the Battle of West Kay. (Note: Arab was commanded by John Perkins, possibly the first black commissioned officer in the Royal Navy.) When the British captured the Danish West Indies in 1801, Lougen was part of the booty. The British later returned her to Denmark where she was broken up in 1802.

== Service record ==
- 1793 – October 1794: Captained by Hans Michael Kaas, Lougen arrived at St Croix in the Danish West Indies on 29 June 1793, having captured a privateer en route. In harbour on 14 August the ship rode out a severe hurricane with three heavy anchors, warp lines and other cables employed. In October an epidemic of sickness swept through the various ships in the Danish West Indies, with sixteen deaths on Lougen alone.

Returning to Denmark in October 1794 Lougen and three smaller ships repatriated 125 troublesome (striking?) house builders to Rostock.

- 1795–96: Danish home waters (Elbe and West Jutland) under the command of Captain Johan Hartvig Ernst von Berger.
- 1797–99: Mediterranean, in company with HDMS Thetis but not before the Battle of Tripoli (16 May 1797). The squadron of three frigates and two brigs had the duty of protecting Danish shipping from interference by the Bey of Tripoli.
- 1800–01: Danish West Indies. (Note: Carl Wilhelm Jessen was 1st officer of Lougen during the 1793–94 service, and captain in 1800–01. After the Napoleonic Wars he continued his close association with the Danish West Indies as commandant and later governor of St Thomas, He was promoted rear admiral on his retirement from the Navy on 9 June 1822. He died on 30 March 1823 and was buried on St Thomas. In 1901 his body was transferred to the Naval Church på Holmen in Copenhagen.)

On 1 September 1800, Lougen came to the rescue of the schooner Den Aarvaagne, (Note: The name Den Aarvaagne translates as "Alert" or "The Watchman".) when the latter was under attack by the British privateer Dreadnought. On Lougen's approach, Dreadnought broke off the action.

Later in 1800, Lougen captured the privateer Eagle and brought the captured schooner into St Thomas.

== Battle of West Kay ==
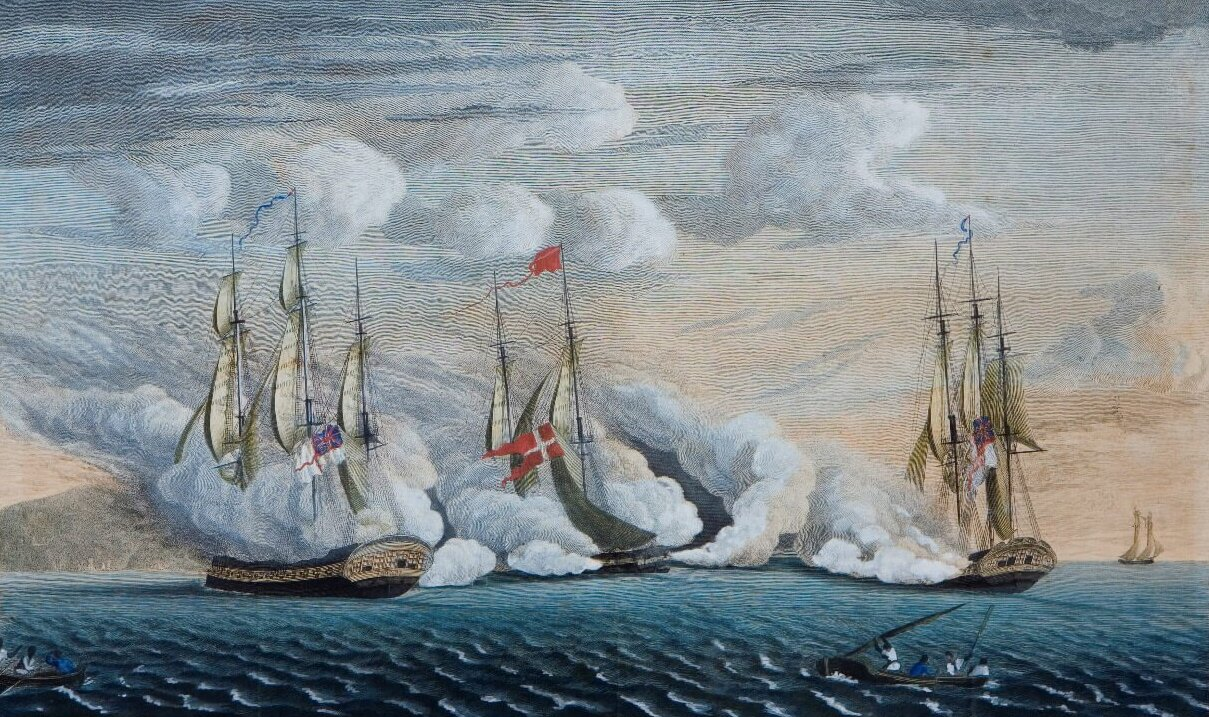
Aquatint engraving of the Battle of West Kay

On 3 March 1801, as rumours of a diplomatic rift between Britain and Second League of Armed Neutrality were first reaching the Danish West Indies, and a full month before the first Battle of Copenhagen, Lougen met and fought with HMS Arab and the privateer Experiment off West Kay, St Thomas. The two British ships approached the brig Lougen, under the command of Captain Carl Wilhelm Jessen, and the schooner Den Aarvaagne. Arab, commanded by Captain John Perkins, approached the two Danish vessels and, according to Danish accounts, without warning, fired several broadsides at Lougen before the Danish ship was able to return fire.

Lougen, which had escaped serious damage, began to return fire steadily. Experiment initially attempted to capture Den Aarvaagne, but Den Aarvaagne obeyed orders to stay out of the fight and instead escaped south to Christiansted on St Croix with its intelligence on British actions. Experiment then joined Arab in the attack on Lougen, with the two British ships sandwiching the Danish ship. During the engagement, which lasted for over an hour, one of Lougen's shots struck the Arab's cathead and loosed the bower anchor. (Perkins reported that it was the first shot from Lougen that loosed the bower anchor.) Arab's crew was unable to cut the anchor free, leaving Arab unable to manoeuvre effectively. This allowed Jessen to steer a course that brought Lougen under the protection of the shore batteries and then into St Thomas. The Danish government awarded Captain Jessen a presentation sword made of gold, a medal and 400 rixdollars (the equivalent of a whole year's salary for a captain in the Danish Navy) for his actions.

== Fate ==
British military dominance in the area could not be countered. British forces took Lougen as a prize when they occupied the Danish West Indies in March. One year later, in 1802, the British returned Lougen to Denmark when peace was restored. The Danes later decommissioned the brig and she was broken up.
