= Copenhagenization =

Copenhagenization or Copenhagenisation may refer to:

- To become more like Copenhagen, in particular:
  - Copenhagenization (bicycling), to increase facilities for urban cycling
  - Copenhagenization (linguistics), levelling of Danish dialects towards the Copenhagen standard language
- Pre-emptive seizure of a nation's fleet while it is anchored, after the British Navy's 1807 bombardment of Copenhagen and capture of the Danish fleet.
