= Battle of Copenhagen (1807) =

Battle of the Napoleonic Wars

- Part of the Napoleonic Wars
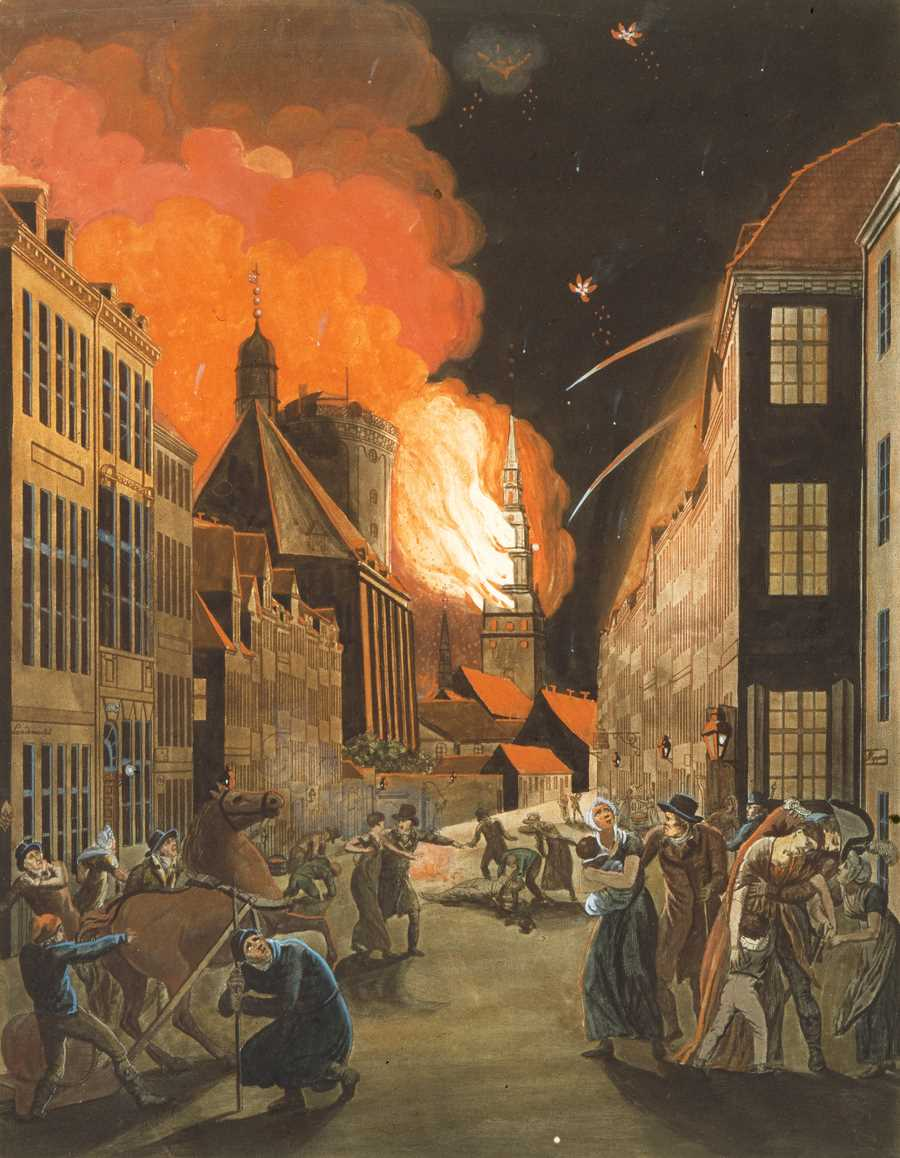
- Copenhagen on fire by Christoffer Wilhelm Eckersberg, 1808
Date	15 August – 7 September 1807
Location	Copenhagen, Denmark–Norway 55°40′46″N 12°34′22″E
Result	British victory

Belligerents
United Kingdom	Denmark–Norway

Commanders and leaders
James Gambier; Lord Cathcart	Ernst Peymann (surrendered)

Strength
25,000; 25 vessels	10,000; 18 ships of the line 16 frigates 9 brigs 26 gunboats

Casualties and losses
42 killed 145 wounded 24 missing	300 killed or wounded 18 ships of the line captured 16 frigates captured 9 brigs captured 26 gunboats captured
- 195 civilians killed 768 civilians wounded

The Battle of Copenhagen (also known as the Bombardment of Copenhagen) occurred between 16 August and 7 September 1807 during the Napoleonic Wars. British forces bombarded the Danish capital of Copenhagen in order to capture or destroy the Royal Dano-Norwegian Navy. Following the Danish surrender, most of their navy was seized by the British and taken to England. The battle led to the outbreak of the Anglo-Danish Gunboat War, and the Anglo-Russian War of 1807–1812.

From 1803 onwards, Britain and France had been embroiled in the Napoleonic Wars, and by 1807 both nations were focused on Denmark, which maintained a large navy. The Danish government attempted to remain neutral, but this pleased neither the British or French, with the former being concerned by the possibility of France taking control of the Danish navy. In mid-July 1807, George III authorised a British expedition to monitor Copenhagen and capture the city if necessary. A force of 18,000 soldiers, under General Lord Cathcart, supported by a fleet of 17 warships under Admiral James Gambier, set sail for Copenhagen, arriving off the city on 15 August.

British troops landed at Vedbæk on 16 August and began besieging Copenhagen, defeating a Danish army at the Battle of Køge on 29 August. On 2 September, the British began bombarding Copenhagen, which led to the city's defenders suing for peace on 5 September and surrendering two days later. Most of the Danish navy was seized and sailed to England, while several Danish warships under construction were destroyed by the British. Following the battle, the Danes allied with France and joined the anti-British Continental System, along with engaging in the Gunboat War against Britain. The attack gave rise to the term to Copenhagenize as a reference to the pre-emptive seizure of a nation's fleet while it was anchored.

== Background ==
Despite being defeated in the Battle of Copenhagen in 1801, Denmark–Norway still maintained a considerable navy. Most of the Royal Danish Army, led by the Crown Prince, was in 1807 defending Denmark's southern border against a possible French invasion. There was concern in Britain that Napoleon might try to force Denmark to close the Baltic Sea to British ships, perhaps by marching French troops into Zealand. The Baltic was "vitally important to Britain" for trade as well as a major source of necessary raw materials for building and maintaining warships; access to the Baltic also gave the Royal Navy a route to help Britain's allies Sweden and (before the treaties of Tilsit) Russia against France. The British were concerned by the fact after Prussia had been defeated by France in December 1806, Denmark's independence looked increasingly under threat from the French. George Canning's predecessor as Foreign Secretary, Lord Howick, had tried unsuccessfully to persuade Denmark to join a secret alliance with Britain and Sweden.

On 21 January 1808, Lord Hawkesbury told the House of Lords that he had received information from someone on the Continent "that there were secret engagements in the Treaty of Tilsit to employ the navies of Denmark and Portugal against this country". He refused to publish the source because he said it would endanger their lives. The reports of French diplomats and merchants in northern Europe made the British government uneasy, and by mid-July, the British believed that the French intended to invade Holstein in order to use Denmark against Britain. Some reports suggested that the Danes had secretly agreed to this. The British cabinet decided to act, and on 14 July Lord Mulgrave obtained from George III permission to send a naval force of 21 to 22 ships to the Kattegat for surveillance of the Danish navy in order to pursue "prompt and vigorous operations" if that seemed necessary. The cabinet decided on 18 July to send Francis James Jackson on a secret mission to Copenhagen to persuade Denmark to hand over its navy to Britain. That same day, the Admiralty issued an order for more than 50 ships to sail for "particular service" under Admiral James Gambier. On 19 July, Lord Castlereagh, the Secretary of State for War and the Colonies, ordered General Lord Cathcart at Stralsund to go with his troops to the Øresund where they would get reinforcements.

On the night of 21 July, Canning received intelligence from Tilsit that Napoleon had tried to persuade Alexander I of Russia to form a maritime league with Denmark and Portugal against Britain. Spencer Perceval, the Chancellor of the Exchequer, wrote a memorandum setting out the government's case for sending forces to Copenhagen: "The intelligence from so many and such various sources" that Napoleon's intent was to force Denmark into war against Britain could not be doubted. "Nay, the fact that he has openly avowed such intention in an interview with the Emperor of Russia is brought to this country in such a way as it cannot be doubted. Under such circumstances it would be madness, it would be idiotic... to wait for an overt act". The historian Hilary Barnes claimed that Canning had no knowledge of the secret articles of the Treaty of Tilsit and argued that Canning's decision was "rash, calamitous, and lacking in understanding of the Danes and of Danish foreign policy."

The British assembled a force of 25,000 troops, and the vanguard sailed on 30 July; Jackson set out the next day. Canning offered Denmark a treaty of alliance and mutual defence, with a convention signed for the return of the fleet after the war, the protection of 21 British warships and a subsidy for how many soldiers Denmark kept standing. On 31 July, Napoleon ordered Talleyrand to tell Denmark to prepare for war against Britain or else Jean-Baptiste Bernadotte would invade Holstein. Neither Talleyrand nor Jackson persuaded the Danes to end their neutrality, so on 15 August Jackson went back to the British fleet assembled in the Sound. The British published a proclamation demanding the deposit of the Danish fleet; the Danes responded with "what amounted to a declaration of war". As the first move in the campaign a division of 29 vessels under Commodore Richard Goodwin Keats was detached to the Great Belt with instructions to seal the island of Zealand off from Funen and the west. Within a week some 200 miles of coast had been secured and the Danish army in Holstein prevented from passing into Zealand to lend support. Copenhagen was left to its own resources to defend itself from a British force of 25,000. On 12 August, the 32-gun Danish frigate Friderichsværn sailed for Norway from Elsinore. Gambier sent the 74-gun third-rate Defence and the 22-gun sixth-rate Comus after her, even though war had not yet been declared. Comus was much faster than Defence in the light winds and so outdistanced her. On 15 August, Comus caught Friderichsværn off Marstrand and captured her. The Royal Navy took her into service as HMS Frederikscoarn.

== Battle ==
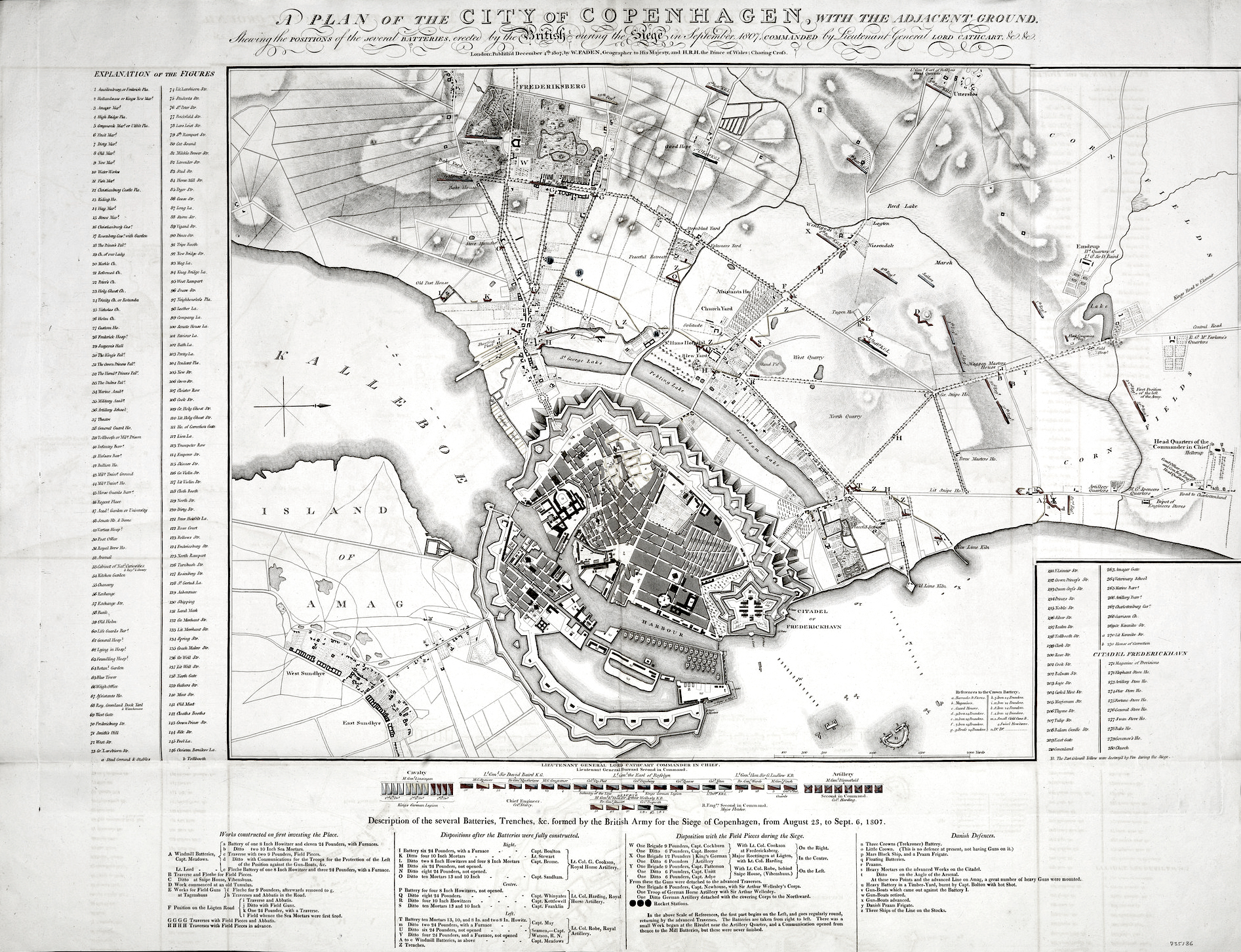
Map of Copenhagen and its surroundings showing the layout of the city and the British positions during the siege

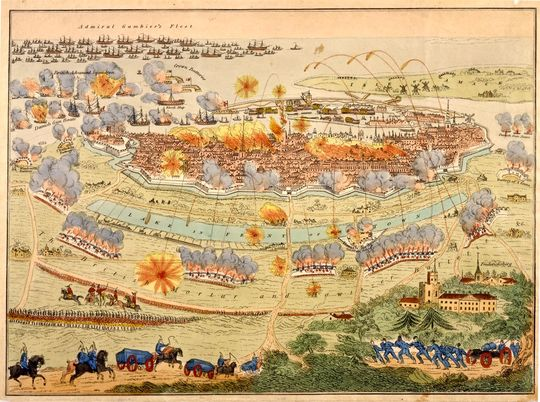
Bombardment of Copenhagen 1807; view from Valby Hill.

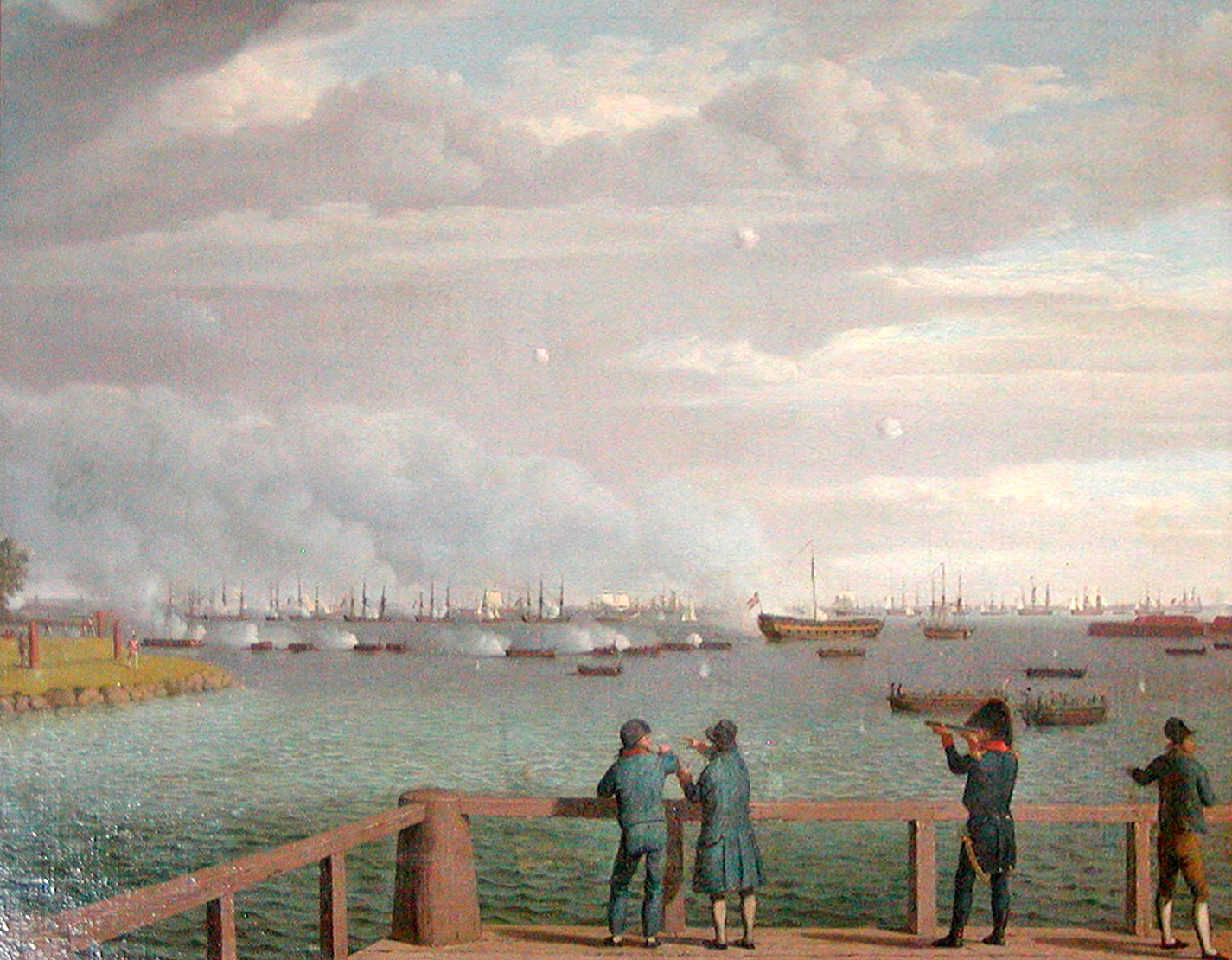
The English fleet off Copenhagen, by C.W. Eckersberg.

British forces besieging the city comprised 18,000 men in 3 infantry divisions, 4 cavalry regiments and 84 field guns and 101 siege guns.

The Danish forces in the city amounted to 5,000 regular troops and a similar number of militias. The city itself was fortified with approximately one mile of ramparts and bastions in the Dutch manner, supplemented in the north by the Citadel, disposing an artillery total of 321 guns and 82 mortars. Most of the civilian inhabitants of Copenhagen were evacuated in the few days before Copenhagen was completely besieged. On 26 August, General Arthur Wellesley was detached with his reserve and two light brigades of British artillery, as well as one battalion, eight squadrons and one troop of horse artillery from the King's German Legion (KGL) to disperse a force which had been sent to relieve the beleaguered city. On 29 August, at the rivulet of Køge, this significant British force swiftly overpowered the Danish troops, which amounted to only three or four regular battalions and some cavalry. The Danes rejected British demands, so the British army under the command of General Lord Cathcart bombarded the city from 2 to 5 September. In addition to the military casualties incurred by the Danish army, the bombardment killed roughly 195 civilians and injured 768. The bombardment included 300 Congreve rockets, which caused fires. (Note: Various accounts say that between 10,000 and 120,000 rockets were launched. Congreve, who was present in Copenhagen, stated that "only 300 were fired"; other documents agree with these numbers.) Due to the civilian evacuation, the normal firefighting arrangements were ineffective; over a thousand buildings were burned.

On 5 September, the Danes sued for peace, and the capitulation was signed on 7 September. Denmark agreed to surrender its navy and its naval stores. In return, the British undertook to leave Copenhagen within six weeks. Ernst Peymann, the Danish Commander, had been under orders from the Crown Prince to burn the Danish fleet, which he failed to do, though the reason for his failure is unknown. (Note: The order came from the Crown Prince because the King, Christian VII of Denmark, was not mentally stable.) Thus, on 7 September Peymann surrendered 18 ships of the line, 11 frigates, two smaller ships, two ship-sloops, seven brig-sloops, two brigs, one schooner and 26 gunboats. In addition, the British broke up or destroyed three 74-gun ships of the line on the stocks, along with two of the ships-of-the-fleet and two elderly frigates. After her capture, one ex-Danish ship of the line, Neptunos, ran aground and was burnt on or near the island of Hven. Then, when a storm arose in the Kattegat, the British destroyed or abandoned 23 of the captured gunboats. The British added the fifteen captured ships of the line that reached Britain to the British Navy but only four—Christian VII 80, Dannemark 74, Norge 74 and Princess Carolina 74—saw subsequent active service. On 21 October, the British fleet left Copenhagen for the United Kingdom. However, the war continued until 1814, when the Treaty of Kiel was signed.

== Aftermath ==
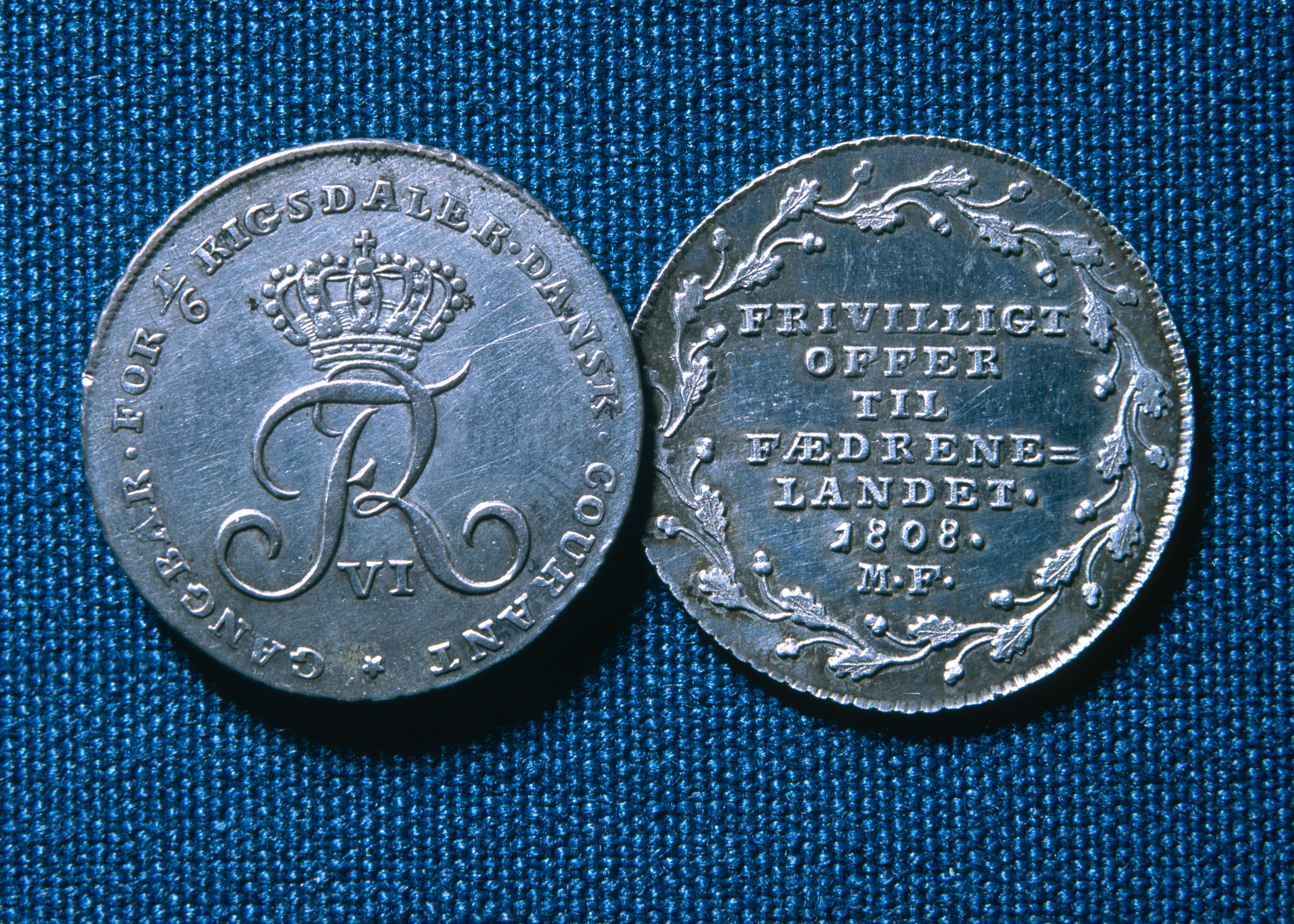
A so-called offermønt used for financing the rebuilding of a Danish fleet

The news of what happened did not reach Canning until 16 September. He wrote to Rev. William Leigh: "Did I not tell you we would save Plumstead from bombardment?" One week later he wrote: "Nothing ever was more brilliant, more salutary or more effectual than the success [at Copenhagen]" and Perceval expressed similar sentiments. The Times said that the confiscation of the Danish fleet was "a bare act of self-preservation" and noticed the short distance between Denmark and Ireland or north-east Scotland. William Cobbett in his Political Register wrote that it was "vile mockery" and "mere party cavilling" to claim that Denmark had the means to preserve her neutrality. MP William Wilberforce said the expedition could be defended on grounds of self-defence. Thomas Grenville wrote to his brother Lord Grenville that he could not help feeling "that in their [the government's] situation we should very probably have given the same order without being able to publish to Parliament the grounds on which we had believed in the hostile mind of Denmark".

The opposition claimed the national character was stained and Canning read out in Parliament the previous administration's plans in 1806 to stop the Portuguese navy falling into the hands of France. Canning and Castlereagh wished to hold Zealand and suggested that when the British evacuated it as part of the peace they should immediately occupy it again. This was strongly opposed by Sir Arthur Wellesley, however, and it did not happen. The opposition claimed that the attack had turned Denmark from a neutral into an enemy. Canning replied by saying that since hostility towards Britain existed throughout Europe the British could wage an "all-out maritime war" against France without worrying who they were going to upset. Lord Erskine condemned the attack by saying "if hell did not exist before, Providence would create it now to punish ministers for that damnable measure".

The opposition did not at first table a vote of censure on the battle and instead, on 3 February 1808, demanded the publication of all the letters sent by the British envoy in Denmark on information regarding the war-readiness of the Danish navy. Canning replied with a three-hour speech which Lord Palmerston described as "so powerful that it gave a decisive turn to the debate". The three motions on this subject were heavily defeated and on 21 March the opposition tabled a direct motion of censure on the battle. It was defeated by 224 votes to 64 after Canning made a speech "very witty, very eloquent and very able". The bombardment frustrated the first attempt to publish a modern edition of the Anglo-Saxon poem Beowulf as the subsequent fire destroyed the 20-year work of scholar Grímur Jónsson Thorkelin. Two manuscripts, however, were recovered and Thorkelin eventually published the poem in 1815. A horse foaled in 1808 (the year following the battle) was named "Copenhagen" in its honour, and was eventually sold to Wellesley and became his favoured mount, most notably at the Battle of Waterloo.

Within one week of the British forces departing Copenhagen, King Christian VII's government promulgated the Danish Privateers Regulations (1807). Denmark was now at war with Britain, and a part of the Anglo-Danish conflict would be taken up by privateers. Kaperbreve (letters of marque) were issued in Denmark and Norway from 1807 to 1813—copies of original letters of marque for the two ships Odin and Norges Statholder are included in this reference. Danish shipping companies donated suitable ships (brigs, schooners and galleases) to the state which could then equip the ships for their new privateering role. One such ship was the brig Admiral Juel which ranged the North Sea before her capture by the British off Scarborough.

== Forces involved ==
=== British troops ===
The British troops under General Lord Cathcart were organised as follows:

- Cavalry Brigade: Major General Charles, Baron Linsingen, 1st, 2nd, 3rd Light Dragoons King's German Legion
- Artillery & Engineers: Major General Thomas Blomefield, 84 field guns and 101 siege guns
  - John May's Company, 1st Battalion, Royal Artillery
  - James Cockburn's Company, 1st Battalion, Royal Artillery
  - Robert Birch's Company, 2nd Battalion, Royal Artillery
  - John Taylor's Company, 3rd Battalion, Royal Artillery
  - Charles Younghusband's Company, 3rd Battalion, Royal Artillery
  - John Kattlewell's Company, 3rd Battalion, Royal Artillery
  - Peter Fyers' Company, 3rd Battalion, Royal Artillery
  - P. Meadow's Company, 8th Battalion, Royal Artillery
- First Division: Lieutenant General Sir George Ludlow
  - Guards Brigade: Major General Edward Finch, 1/Coldstream Regiment of Foot Guards, 1/3rd Regiment of Foot Guards
  - 1st Brigade: Brigadier General Henry Warde, 1/28th (North Gloucestershire) Regiment of Foot, 1/79th Regiment of Foot (Cameron Highlanders)
- Second Division: Lieutenant General Sir David Baird
  - 2nd Brigade: Major General Thomas Grosvenor, 1/4th (The King's Own) Regiment of Foot, 1/23rd Regiment of Foot (Royal Welsh Fusiliers)
  - 3rd Brigade: Major General Brent Spencer, 1/32nd (Cornwall) Regiment of Foot, 1/50th (Queen's Own) Regiment of Foot, 1/82nd Regiment of Foot (Prince of Wales's Volunteers)
  - 4th Brigade: Colonel Robert Henry MacFarlane, 1/7th Regiment of Foot (Royal Fusiliers), 1/8th (The King's) Regiment of Foot
- Reserve: Major General Sir Arthur Wellesley
  - Colonel Richard Stewart, 1/43rd (Monmouthshire) Regiment of Foot, 2/52nd (Oxfordshire) Regiment of Foot, 1/92nd (Gordon Highlanders) Regiment of Foot, 5 coys. 1/95th Rifles, 2/95th Rifles
- KGL Division: Major General Frederick, Baron Dreschel
  - 1st Brigade: Colonel Peter du Plat, 6th, 7th, 8th Line Batts.
  - 2nd Brigade: Colonel George de Drieburg, 3rd, 4th, 5th Line Batts.
  - 3rd Brigade: Colonel Adolphus, Baron Barsse, 1st and 2nd Line Batts.
  - 4th Brigade: Colonel Charles, Baron Alten, 1st and 2nd Light Batts.

=== Danish troops ===
The Danish troops under Maj. Gen. Peymann were as follows:

- Artillery:
  - 119 cannon, 27 mortars, 250 men
- Cavalry:
  - Horse Guards (Garden til Hest) 90 men
  - Zealand Horse (Sjælland Ryttere) 395 men
  - Hussar Drill School (? cadets) (Husar Exerceerskole) 45 men
- Infantry:
  - Foot Guards (Garden til Fods) 320 men
  - Danish Life Regiment (Life Guards) (Danske LivRegiment) 1300 men
  - Norwegian Regt. (En bataillon af Norske do.) 850 men
  - Marines (Marinere) 2450 men
  - Recruits (Recruiter) 413 men
- Misc: (? Volunteers)
  - Bodyguards (Livjægerne) 330 men
  - Manor Shooters (? Yeomanry) (Heeresgaardskytterne) 118 men
  - Danish National Guard (Landsværn) 520 men
  - Citizens Armament ( ? Militia ) (Borgervæbningen) 400 men
  - Students (Studenterne) 800 men

=== British ships ===
One hundred and twenty-six ships, large and small, were involved at Copenhagen, included those named below.
In addition to those named here, there were another three dozen smaller frigates, sloops, bomb vessels, gun-brigs and schooners (e.g. HMS Rook attached to the British fleet), and a very large number of merchant or requisitioned ships carrying troops or supplies. (Note: All were awarded prize money at the rate of £3 8s per able seaman and £22 11s per petty officer for their presence on 7 September 1807 at Copenhagen.)

The following ships sailed with Gambier from England on 26 July 1807:

- Prince of Wales 98 (flag of Admiral James Gambier, 1st Captain Sir Home Riggs Popham, 2nd Captain Adam Mackenzie)
- Pompee 74 (Vice-Admiral Henry Edwyn Stanhope, Captain *Richard Dacres)
- Centaur 74 (Commodore Sir Samuel Hood, Captain William Henry Webley)
- Ganges 74 (Commodore Richard Goodwin Keats, Captain Peter Halkett)
- Alfred 74 (Captain John Bligh)
- Brunswick 74 (Captain Thomas Graves)
- Captain 74 (Captain Isaac Wolley)
- Goliath 74 (Captain Peter Puget)
- Hercule 74 (Captain John Colville)
- Maida 74 (Captain Samuel Hood Linzee)
- Orion 74 (Captain Sir Archibald Collingwood Dickson)
- Resolution 74 (Captain George Burlton)
- Spencer 74 (Captain Robert Stopford)
- Vanguard 74 (Captain Alexander Fraser)
- Dictator 64 (Captain Donald Campbell)
- Nassau 64 (Captain Robert Campbell)
- Ruby 64 (Captain John Draper)
- Surveillante 38 (Captain George Collier)
- Sibylle 38 (Capt. Clotworthy Upton)
- Franchise 36 (Capt. Charles Dashwood)
- Nymphe 36 (Capt. Conway Shipley)

The following vessels joined on 5 August off Helsingør:

- Superb 74 (Captain Donald M'Leod) (to which Commodore Richard Goodwin Keats shifted his flag)

The following further vessels joined on 7 August off Helsingør:

- Minotaur 74 (Rear-Admiral William Essington, Captain Charles John Moore Mansfield)
- Valiant 74 (Captain James Young)
- Inflexible 64 (Captain Joshua Rowley Watson)
- Leyden 64 (Captain William Cumberland)

The following vessels joined on 8 August or later:

- Defence 74 (Captain Charles Ekins)
- Mars 74 (Captain William Lukin)
- Agamemnon 64 (Captain Jonas Rose)
- Africaine 32 (Capt. Richard Raggett)

Lieutenant-General Lord Cathcart arrived in the Africaine on 12 August to take command of the ground forces.

=== Danish ships ===
The Danes surrendered the following warships on 7 September under the terms of the capitulation following the attack: (Note: The initial listing in the London Gazette names almost all of the ships, once one adjusts for ad hoc translations of names from Danish to English, and for transliterations. This initial list does not include the frigate Nymphen, the two brigs Allart and Delphinen, the schooner Ornen, or the gunboat Stege. Though it mentions that twenty-five gunboats were taken, it does not list them by name.; In this list, ships' names and number of cannon areas recorded in the individual ship's record cards by the Danish Naval Museum Orlogmuseet Skibregister)

==== Ships of the line ====
- Christian den Syvende 84 – sailed to Britain, added to Royal Navy as Christian VII 80
- Neptunus (80) – sailed for Britain but wrecked and burned en route
- Valdemar (80) – sailed to Britain, added to Royal Navy as Waldemar 80
- Danmark (76) – sailed to Britain, added to Royal Navy as Danmark 74
- Norge (78) – sailed to Britain, added to Royal Navy as Norge 74
- Fyen (70) – sailed to Britain, added to Royal Navy as Fyen 74
- Kronprins Friderich (70) – sailed to Britain, added to Royal Navy as Kron Princen 74
- Tre Kroner (74) – sailed to Britain, added to Royal Navy as Tree Kronen 74
- Arveprins Friderich (70) – sailed to Britain, added to Royal Navy as Heir Apparent Frederick 74
- Skjold (70) – sailed to Britain, added to Royal Navy as Skiold 74
- Odin (74) – sailed to Britain, added to Royal Navy as Odin 74
- Justitia (74) – sailed to Britain, added to Royal Navy as Justitia 74
- Kronprinsesse Maria (70) – sailed to Britain, added to Royal Navy as Kron Princessen 74
- Prindsesse Sophia Frederica (74) – sailed to Britain, added to Royal Navy as Princess Sophia Frederica 74
- Prindsesse Caroline (66) – sailed to Britain, added to Royal Navy as Princess Carolina 74
- Ditmarsken (64) – not sailed to Britain; deemed useless and burnt
- Mars (64) – not sailed to Britain; deemed useless and burnt on Saltholm
- Sejeren (64) – sailed to Britain, added to Royal Navy as Syeren 64

==== Frigates ====
- Perlen 46 – sailed to Britain, added to Royal Navy as Perlen 38
- Rota 40 – sailed to Britain, added to Royal Navy as Rota 38
- Freja 40 – sailed to Britain, added to Royal Navy as Freya 36
- Iris 40 – sailed to Britain, added to Royal Navy as Iris 36
- Najaden 44 – sailed to Britain, added to Royal Navy as Nyaden 36
- Havfruen 40 – sailed to Britain, added to Royal Navy as Hasfruen 36
- Nymfen 36 – sailed to Britain, added to Royal Navy as Nymphen 36
- Venus 36 – sailed to Britain, added to Royal Navy as Venus 36
- Friderichsstein 26 – sailed to Britain, added to Royal Navy as HMS Frederickstein 32
- St Thomas 22 – not sailed to Britain, but deemed useless and burnt
- Triton 24 (+6 howitzers) – not sailed to Britain, but deemed useless and burnt on Saltholm or the Swedish coast
- Lille Belt 20 – sailed to Britain, added to Royal Navy as Little Belt 20
- Fylla 22 – sailed to Britain, added to Royal Navy as Fylla 20
- Eyderen 18 – sailed to Britain, added to Royal Navy as Eyderen 18
- Elven 18 – sailed to Britain, added to Royal Navy as Elven 18
- Glückstadt 12 – sailed to Britain, added to Royal Navy as Gluckstadt 16

==== Brigs ====
- Nidelven 18 – sailed to Britain, added to Royal Navy as HMS Nid Elven 16
- Sarpen 18 – sailed to Britain, added to Royal Navy as Sarpen 18
- Glommen 18 – sailed to Britain, added to Royal Navy as Glommen 16
- Mercurius 18 – sailed to Britain, added to Royal Navy as Mercurius 16
- Delphinen 18 – sailed to Britain, added to Royal Navy as Delphinen 16
- Allart 18 – sailed to Britain, added to Royal Navy as Allart 16
- Brevdrageren 18 – sailed to Britain, added to Royal Navy as Brev Drageren 12
- Flyvende Fiske 14 (brig-rigged cutter) – sailed to Britain, added to Royal Navy as Flying Fish 14
- Ørnen 10 (schooner) – sailed to Britain, added to Royal Navy as HMS Ornen 12

==== Gunboats ====
- Stege 2 (gunboat) – sailed to Britain, added to Royal Navy as HMS Warning

There were a further 25 gunboats similar to the Stege, of which 23 were lost in the October storm in the Kattegat or destroyed rather than sailed to Britain. These lost were:

- Aalborg, Arendal, Assens, Christiansund, Flensborg, Frederiksund, Helsingør, Kallundborg, Langesund, Nakskov, Middelfart, Odense, Roskilde, Rødbye, Saltholmen, Staværn, Svendborg and Wiborg.
- The Norwegians or Danes recovered and returned to naval service six gunboats (Faaborg, Holbek, Kjerteminde, Nestved, Nysted and Nykjøbing) abandoned or stranded in the Kattegat.
- Stubbekjøbing had been destroyed at Svanemølle Bay on 26 August by mortar fire from the land.

==== Gun barges ====
Four barges (stykpram), floating gun platforms each with 20 cannon, were incapable of being moved far and so the British scuttled the barges during their brief occupation of Copenhagen. Of these four barges (Hajen, Kiempen, Lindormen and Sværdfisken) only Hajen was not raised and refurbished by the Danes after the British departure. A further "unsinkable" floating battery (Flaadebatteri No 1) of twenty-four 24-pound cannon was rendered inoperable and decommissioned the following year. (Note: In 1809 there was a plan to give almost all of captured vessels more traditional British warship names, but this plan was later cancelled, and most Danish vessels retained their original names, or at least, anglicised versions thereof until they were broken up.)

== Gallery ==
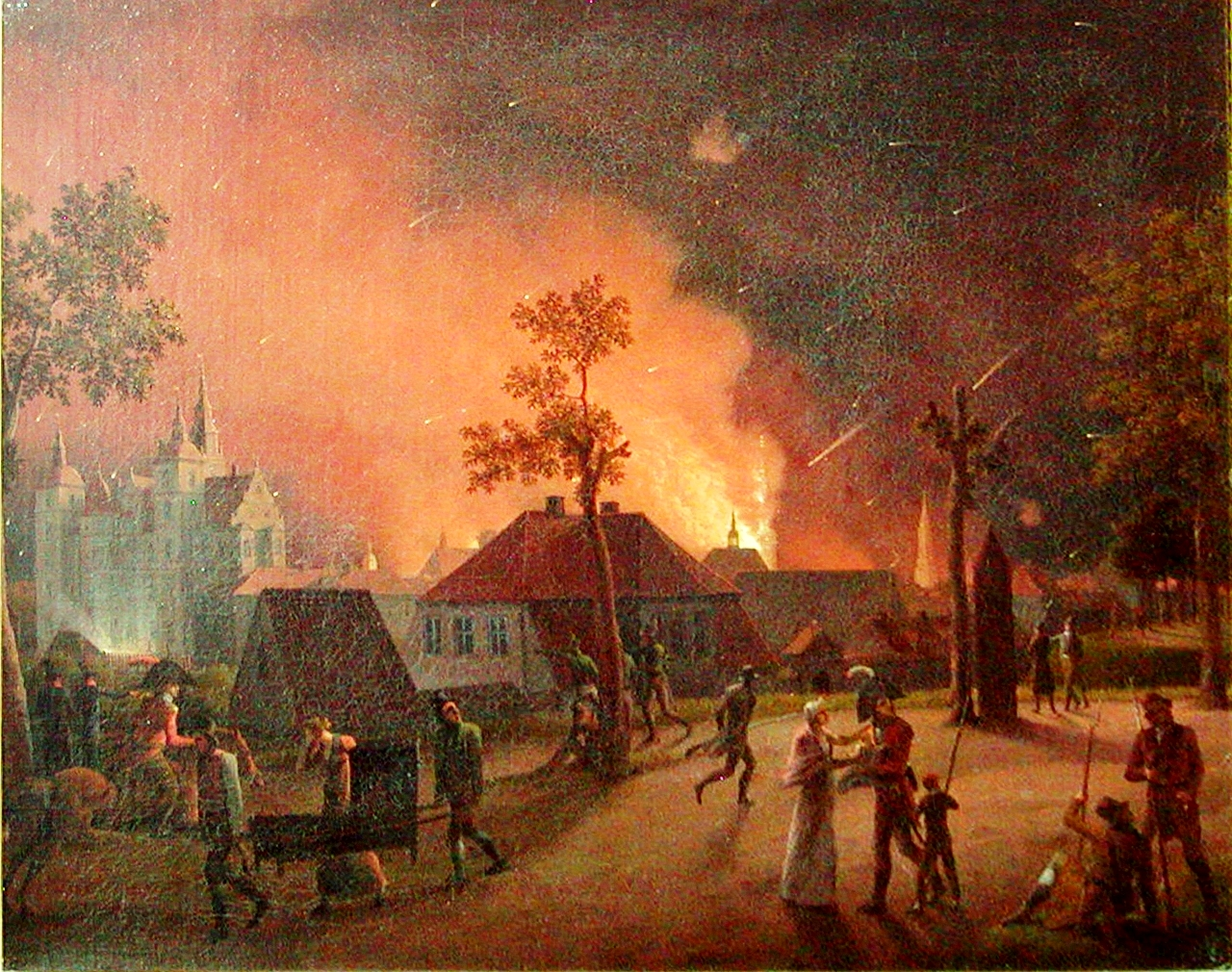
Contemporary Danish painting of the bombardment at night

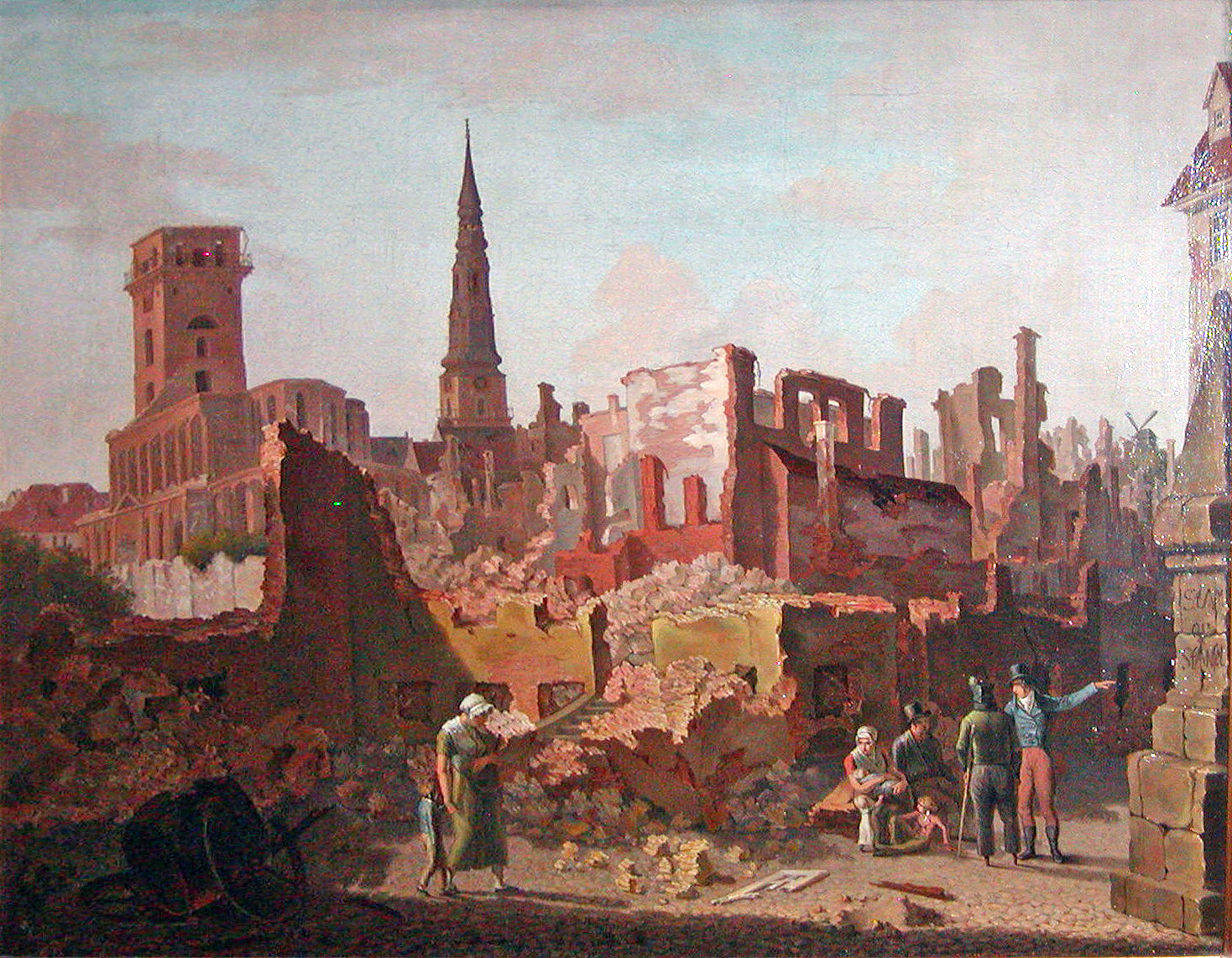
Copenhagen after the bombardment, 1807

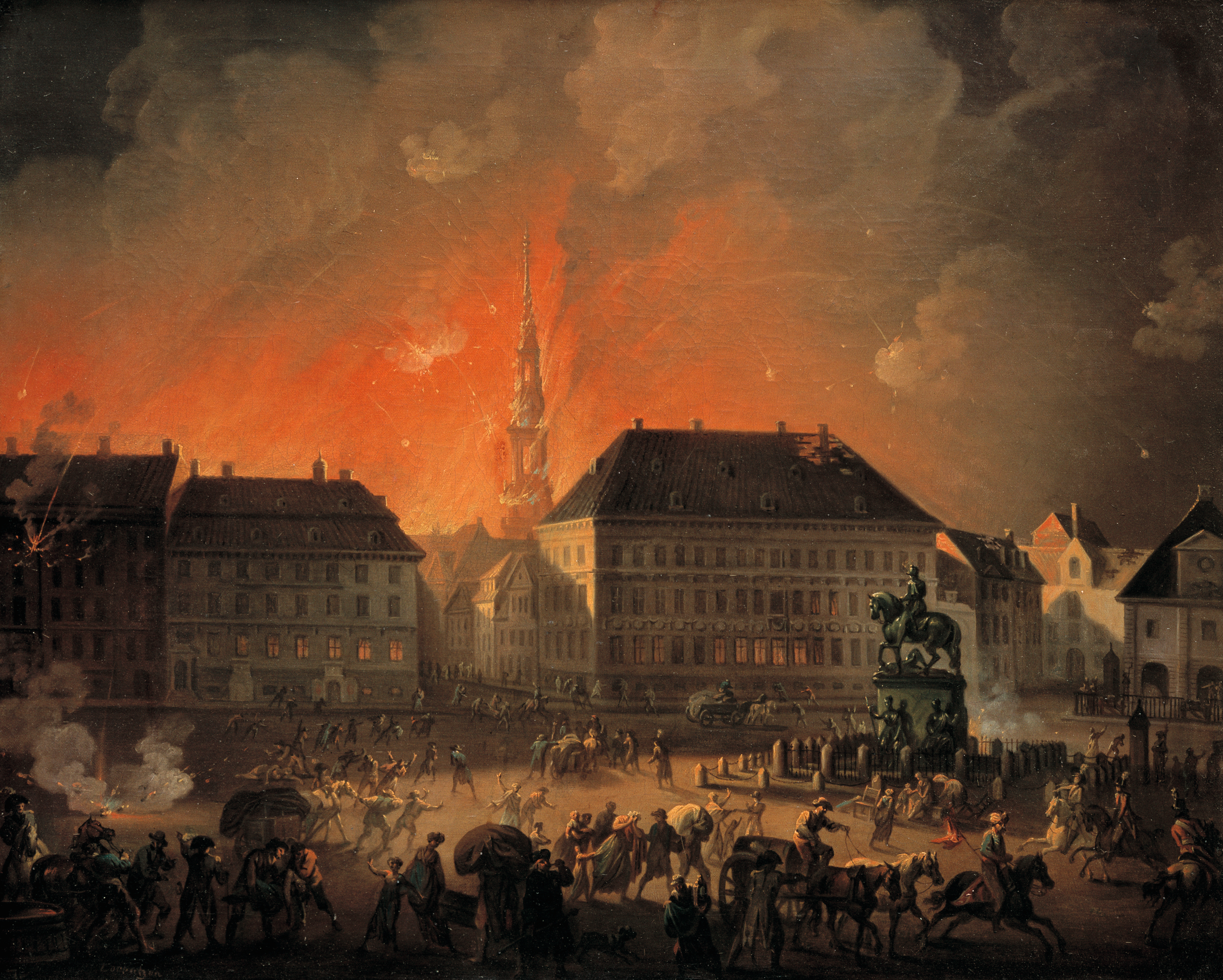
The Most Terrible Night. View of Kongens Nytorv in Copenhagen During the English Bombardment of Copenhagen at Night between 4 and 5 September 1807

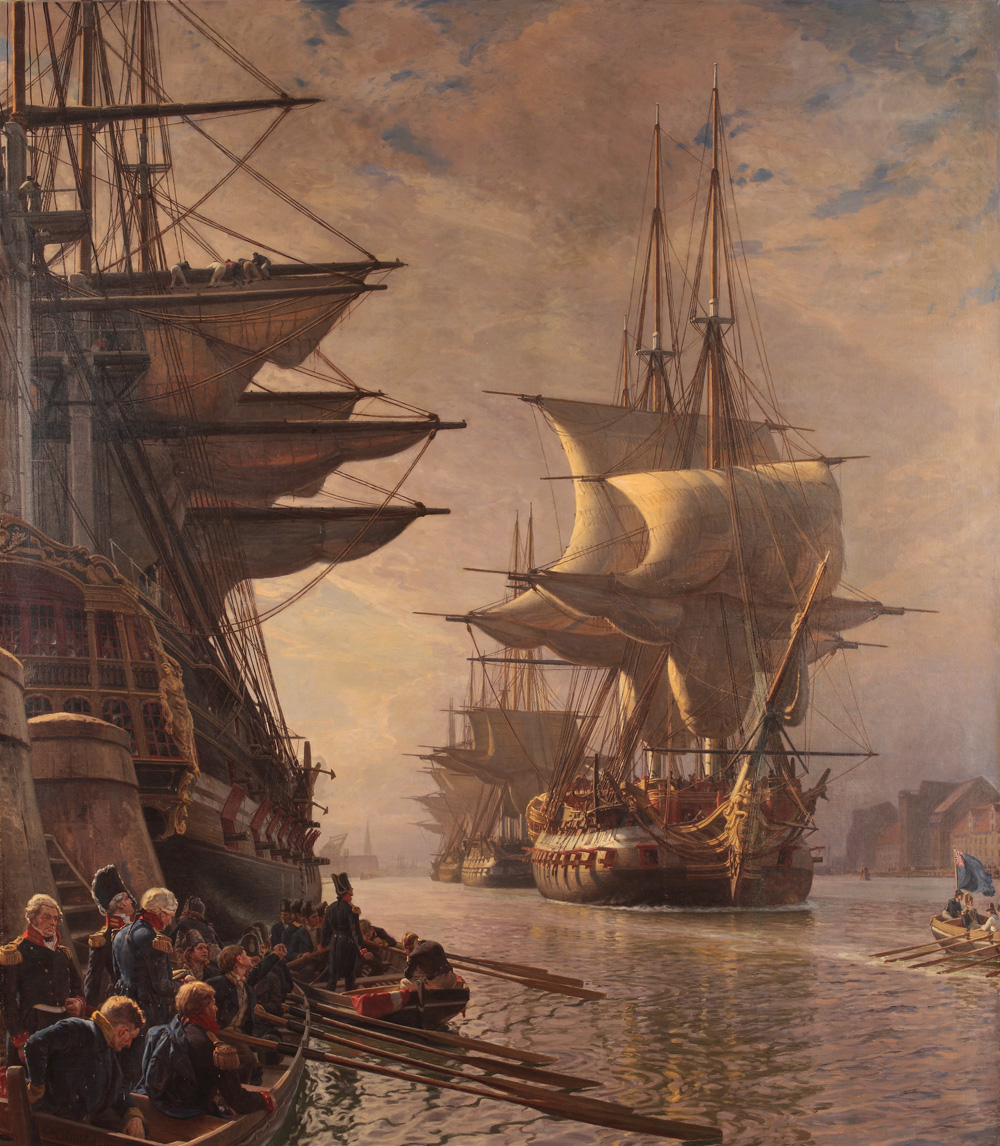
The Fleet Leaves For The Last Time

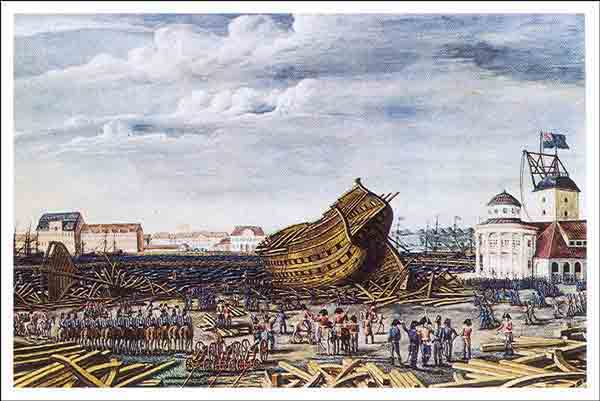
C.W. Eckersberg's The British Destruction of the Danish Ships under Construction at Holmen

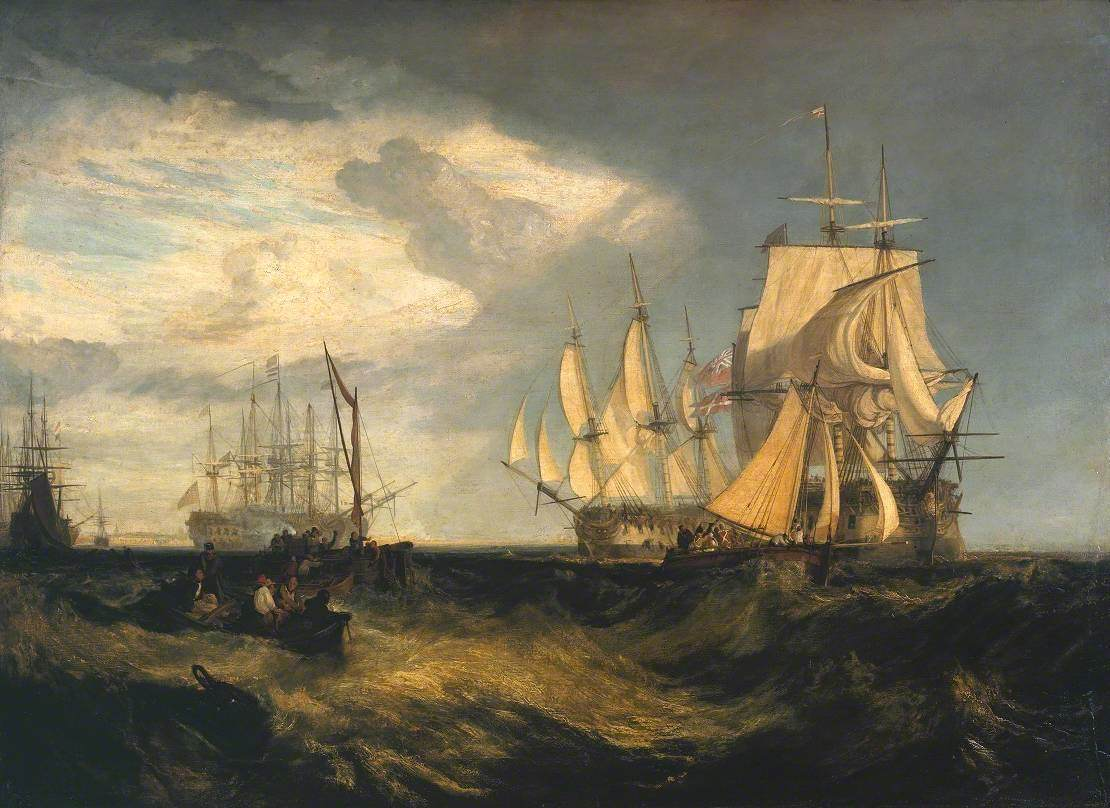
Two Captured Danish Ships Entering Portsmouth Harbour by Turner

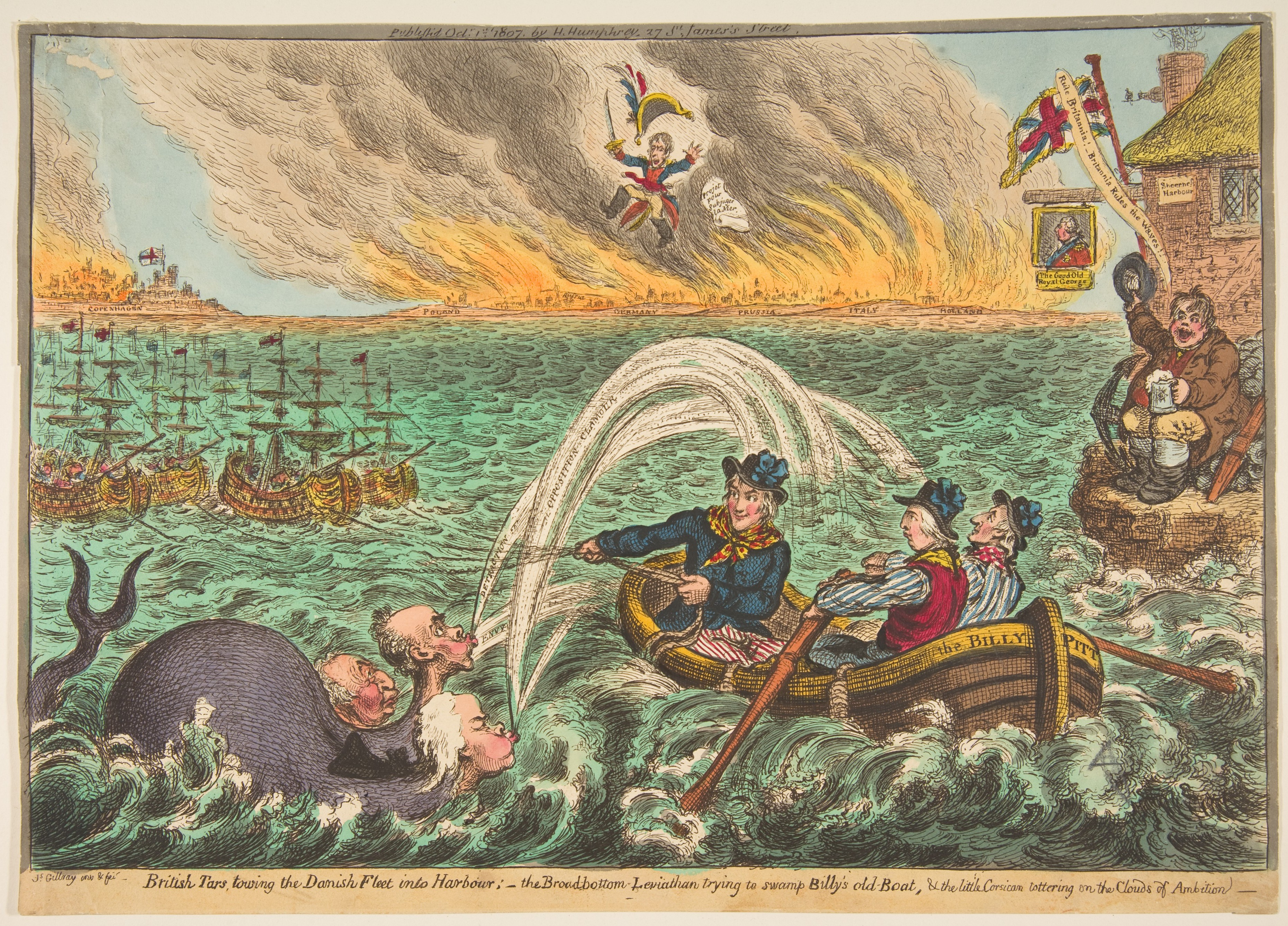
British Tars Towing the Danish Fleet into Harbour by James Gillray

== See also ==
- List of ships captured in the 19th century

== Citations ==
Preceded by Siege of Stralsund (1807)	Napoleonic Wars; Battle of Copenhagen (1807)	Succeeded by Invasion of Portugal (1807)
