= HDMS Delphinen =

Dano-Norwegian brig captured by British Royal Navy

History

Denmark-Norway
- Name: HDMS Delphinen
- Builder: Stibolt
- Launched: 28 July 1805
- Fate: Surrendered to the British 1807

United Kingdom
- Name: HMS Delphinen
- Acquired: Captured from Denmark 7 September 1807
- Commissioned: 1808
- Fate: Wrecked 7 August 1808

General characteristics
- Class & type: Lougen-class brig
- Tons burthen: 3068/94 (bm)
- Length: Overall: 96 ft + 7/8 in (29.3 m); Keel: 76 ft 10 7/8 in (23.4 m)
- Beam: 27 ft 4 1/4 in (8.3 m)
- Depth of hold: 9 ft 6 in (2.9 m)
- Complement: Danish service: 85; British service: 100
- Armament: 16 × 24-pounder carronades + 2 × 6-pounder chase guns

HDMS Delphinen was a brig of the Royal Dano-Norwegian Navy, launched in 1805 at Nyholm. The British Royal Navy captured her in 1807 at the Danish surrender after the Battle of Copenhagen. The Royal Navy commissioned her in 1808 as HMS Dolphinen but she was already lost later that year.

== Construction and design ==
Dolphinen was constructed at Nyholm to a design by Ernst Wilhelm Stibolt. She was launched in 1805. She was 96 ft + 7/8 in (29.3 m) king with a beam of 27 ft 4 1/4 in (8.3 m). Her complement in Danish service was 85 men.

== Career ==
HDMS Delphinen had an uneventful career in Danish service. She was one of six Lougen-class brigs that the naval architect Ernst Wilhelm Stibolt designed and that the British captured in 1807. She was constructed at Nyholm.

After her capture, Delphinen arrived at Chatham on 8 December 1807. She underwent fitting between December 1807 and 11 May 1808. Commander Richard Harward commissioned her in April 1808 for the North Sea.

== Loss ==
On the evening 3 August Delphinen was cruising off the coast of Holland enforcing the British blockade. Commander Harward went below for the night, having left orders that be kept 12 miles offshore. The master took the middle watch, but then went to sleep. At about 3am on 4 August Delphinen struck ground. Water entered and soon overwhelmed the ability of the pumps to deal with it. As waves started to break over her and she started to settle, her crew took to her boats after first setting fire to her. The tides pushed the boats ashore where the crew were taken prisoner. The court martial of Commander Harward, his officers, and crew found that she had gone ashore at the island of Vlieland as a result of the master's gross negligence and inattention. The master, however, had died in captivity at Harlingen.

Lloyd's List reported on 23 August that the sloop-of-war Dolphio had been lost on the coast of Holland on 7 August. It further reported that the crew had been saved but had been taken prisoner. Other reports put the date of loss at 4 August. Delphinen's crew of 90 men and boys were taken prisoner.
