= British Tars Towing the Danish Fleet into Harbour =

1807 editorial cartoon

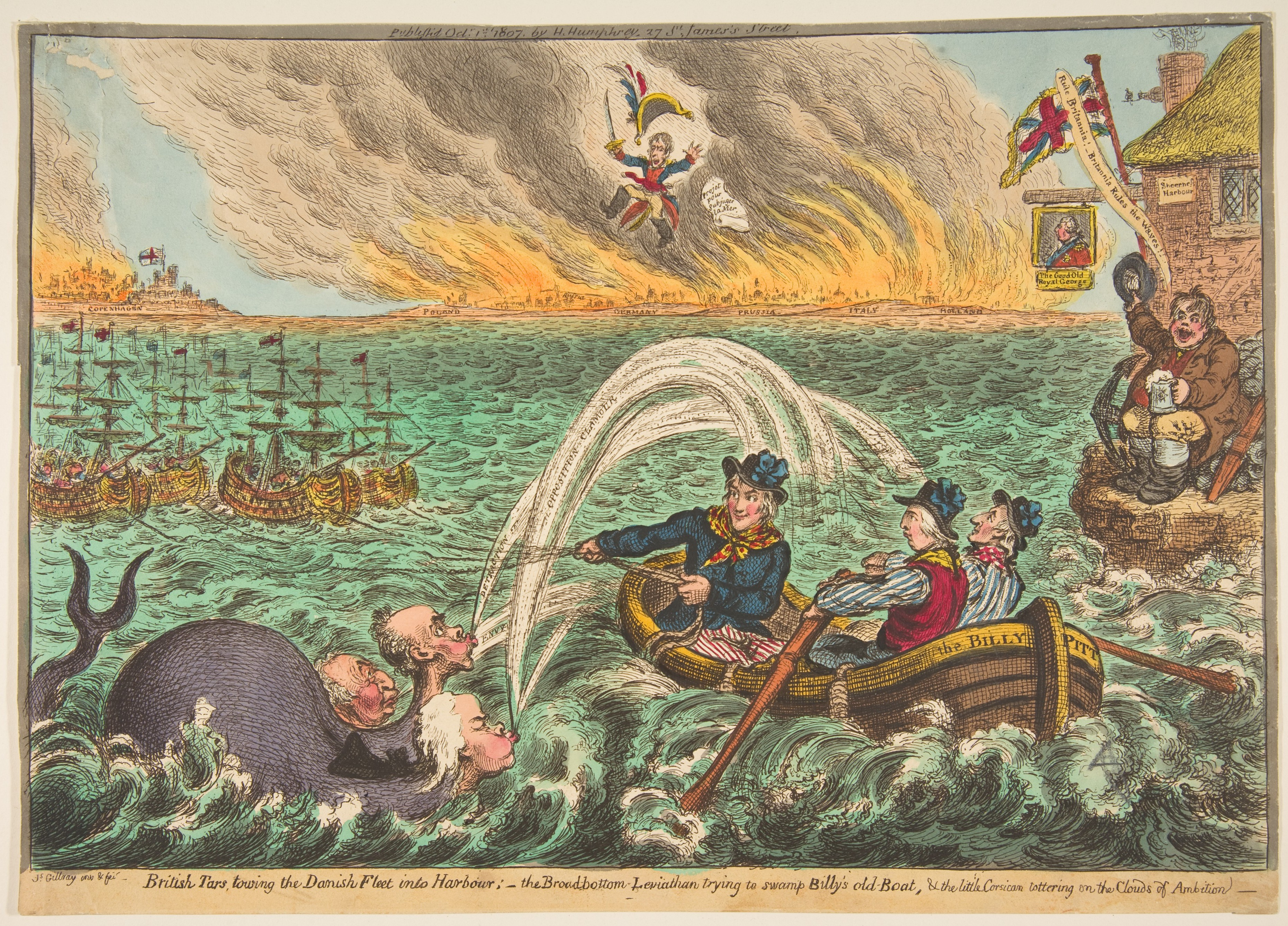
British Tars Towing the Danish Fleet into Harbour (1807) by James Gillray

British Tars Towing the Danish Fleet into Harbour is an 1807 cartoon by the British caricaturist James Gillray. Like much of his work the image portrays a contemporary event, the bombardment of Copenhagen and seizure of the Danish fleet by the Royal Navy to prevent it from falling into the hands of the French Empire with which Britain was at war.

Although militarily successful, the pre-emptive expedition was controversial and was attacked in the British Parliament as a violation of a neutral country. Gillray's cartoon appeared soon afterwards and reflects a generally-favourable view of the military operation. The full title is British Tars Towing the Danish Fleet into Harbour; the Broad-Bottom Leviathan trying Billy's Old Boat, and the Little Corsican tottering on the Clouds of Ambition. Jack Tar is a traditional name for British sailors.

It depicts, in the centre, the Tory government ministers Lord Hawkesbury and Lord Castlereagh rowing a boat named the Billy Pitt (a reference to the former Prime Minister William Pitt), and the Foreign Secretary George Canning is towing the captured Danish fleet into harbour behind him. Spouting water at the boat is Leviathan, a mythical sea monster, with its three heads representing Lord Grenville, Earl Grey, and the veteran admiral Earl St. Vincent, the leaders of the Whig opposition. Their speech bubbles in the water say, respectively, "Opposition Clamour", "Detraction" and "Envy".

Meanwhile, John Bull sits watching approvingly, sings "Rule Britannia" and drinks from a mug of beer outside a tavern in Sheerness Harbour. The inn is patriotically named The Good Old Royal George, with a sign featuring an image of the reigning monarch, George III. In the background of the image, on the left, are the still-smoking ruins of Copenhagen, and on the right, Continental Europe is aflame with a surprised Napoleon hovering over it, his thwarted plans for control of the seas dropping from his hand.

Published by Hannah Humphrey of St James's Street, in London, it was one of the later works produced by Gillray, who largely ceased drawing around 1810. It is now located in the Metropolitan Museum of Art in New York City.

== Bibliography ==
- Grego, Joseph. The Works of James Gillray, the Caricaturist; with the History of His Life and Times. Chatto and Windus, 1873.
- Hunt, Giles. The Duel: Castlereagh, Canning and Deadly Cabinet Rivalry. Bloomsbury Academic, 2008.
- Tracy, Nicholas. Britannia’s Palette: The Arts of Naval Victory. McGill-Queen's Press, 2007.
