= Jack Tar =

Term for a sailor

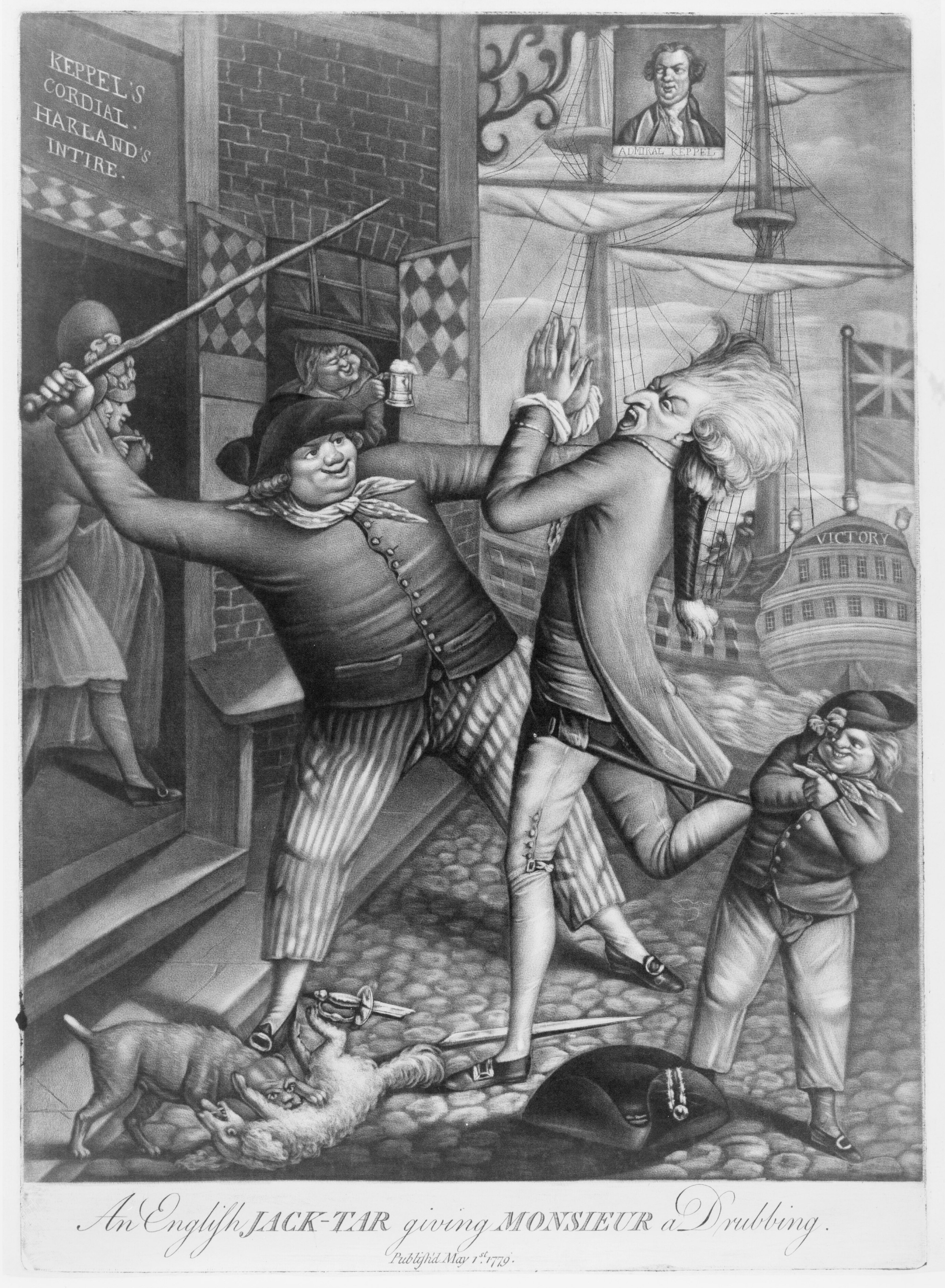
1779 cartoon depicting an English Jack Tar beating a French nobleman

Jack Tar (also Jacktar, Jack-tar or Tar) is a common English term that was originally used to refer to seamen of the Merchant Navy or the Royal Navy, particularly during the British Empire. By World War I the term was used as a nickname for those in the US Navy. Members of the public and seafarers alike made use of the name in identifying those who went to sea. It was not used pejoratively, and sailors were happy to use the term to label themselves.

== Etymology ==
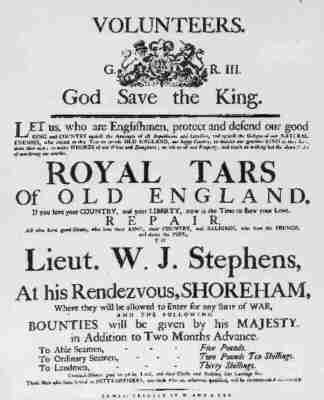
Recruitment poster from the Napoleonic Wars

There are several plausible etymologies for the reference to "tar":

- During the age of wooden sailing vessels, a ship's rigging was rope made of hemp, which would rot quickly in such a damp environment. To avoid that, the ropes and cables of the standing rig were soaked in tar, which had to be replenished by tarring.
- In a widely accepted assumption with no period evidence, it was said that sailors smeared their hair with tar. In a book published in 1915, the author surmised that it was common among seamen to plait their long hair into a ponytail and smear it with high-grade tar to prevent it from getting caught in the ship's equipment.
  - Linehandlers would pull their hair back in ponytail fashion and then apply a tarry substance to prevent any strands from flying loose and becoming entangled or ripped out during the complicated and dangerous linehandling manoeuvres that kept their ship at full sail.

== Usage ==
- James Gillray's 1807 political caricature British Tars Towing the Danish Fleet into Harbour features the cabinet ministers George Canning, Lord Liverpool and Lord Castlereagh as British sailors.
- Gilbert and Sullivan's 1878 operetta H.M.S. Pinafore, subtitled The Lass That Loved a Sailor, uses the synonym "tar" frequently in its dialogue, including the songs "The Merry Maiden and the Tar" and "A British Tar".
- In the 19th century, coopers who crafted barrels on ships were often called groggers or jolly jack tars, as when a barrel of rum had been emptied, they would fill it up with boiling water and roll it around, creating a drink which was called grog.
- One of John Philip Sousa's lesser-known works was his "Jack Tar March", written in 1903, which featured "The Sailor's Hornpipe" tune in one of its segments.
- Ship Ahoy! (All the Nice Girls Love a Sailor) is a 1908 music hall song with the line "all the nice girls love a tar".
- The second verse of George M. Cohan's song "You're a Grand Old Flag" contains the line "Hurrah! Hurrah! for every Yankee Tar".
- The traditional English folk song "Go to Sea Once More", alternatively titled "Jack Tarr the Sailor", tells the tale of a sailor by the name of Jack Tarr who loses everything after an ill-advised drunken escapade while he is ashore in Liverpool.
- The traditional English folk song "Jacky Tar" was sung by Eliza Carthy (previously collected and sung by A. L. Lloyd as "Do Me Ama"): Roud 511; Laws K40; Ballad Index LK40.
- John Adams called the crowd involved with the Boston Massacre "a motley rabble of saucy boys, negros and molattoes, Irish teagues and outlandish jack tarrs".
- "Heart of Oak", the official march of the Royal Navy, features the line "Heart of oak are our ships, jolly tars are our men".
- Rollins College of Winter Park, Florida, chose the "Tar" as its mascot.
- People born in Swansea, Wales, are known as "Jacks" or "Swansea Jacks". One explanation for the name is that the people of Swansea had a reputation as skilled sailors and that their services were much sought after by the navy.
- In Anthony Shaffer's comedy/thriller play Sleuth, the most prominent of Andrew Wyke's automata is Jolly Jack Tarr, the Jovial Sailor. This life-sized figure laughs, and his body shakes appropriately with the pressing of a remote control button. He is in several scenes, including one in which a clue to a murder is hidden on Jolly Jack Tarr's person.
- The term forms the basis for the expression, "I'm alright, Jack", which signifies smug complacence at the expense of others.
