= Henrik Fisker (disambiguation) =

Henrik Fisker may refer to:

- Henrik Fisker (born 1963) Danish-born American Dane car designer
- Henrik Lorentz Fisker (1720–1797) Danish admiral
- Lorentz Henrik Fisker (1753–1819) Danish admiral and oceanographer, awardee of the Grand Cross of the Order of the Dannebrog
