= Lorentz Fisker (disambiguation) =

Lorentz Fisker may refer to:

- Lorentz Henrik Fisker (1753–1819) Danish admiral and oceanographer, awardee of the Grand Cross of the Order of the Dannebrog
- Henrik Lorentz Fisker (1720–1797) Danish admiral
- Lorentz Fisker (mayor) (1684–1757), Danish amtsforvalter (county officer) for Nysted and byfoged (county officer) for Copenhagen
- Lorentz Fisker (judge) (1731–1779), Norwegian, lagmann county officer for Christiansand og Agdesidens
