= Walter Rawlinson =

British banker and politician

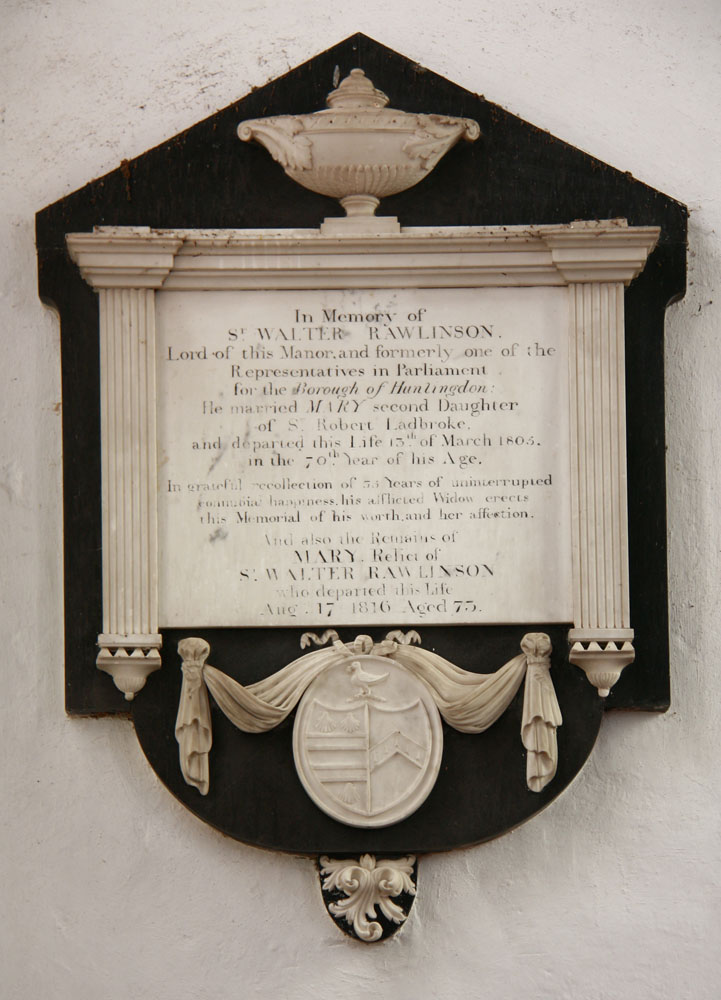
Mural monument to Sir Walter Rawlinson, St George's Church, Stowlangtoft, Suffolk

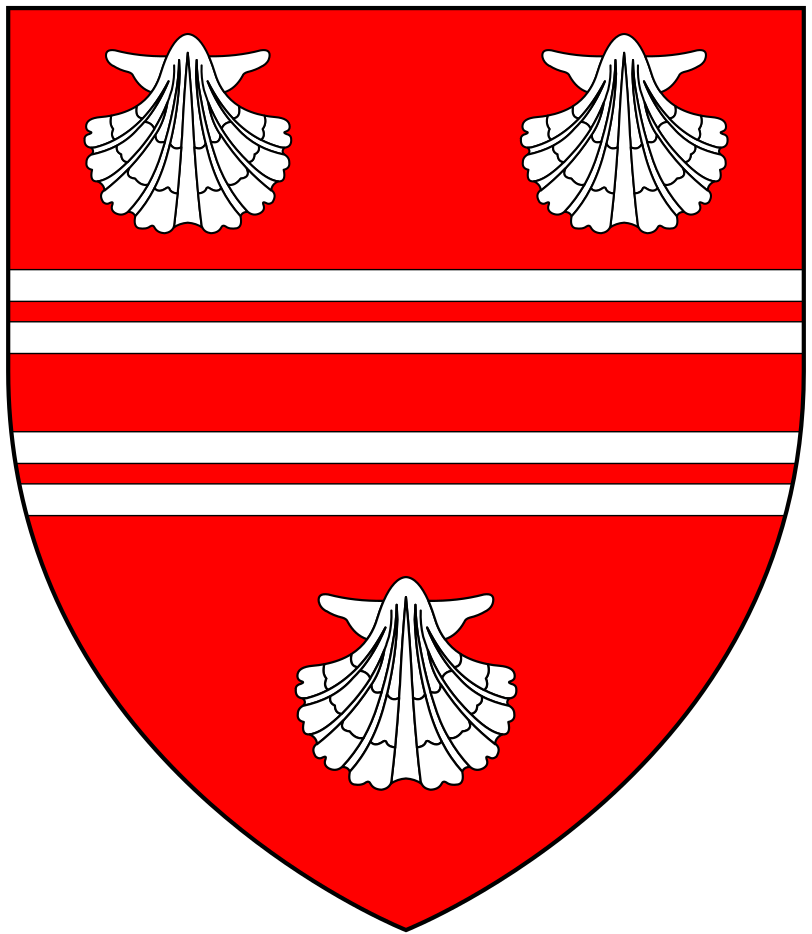
Arms of Rawlinson: Gules, two bars gemelles between three escallops argent

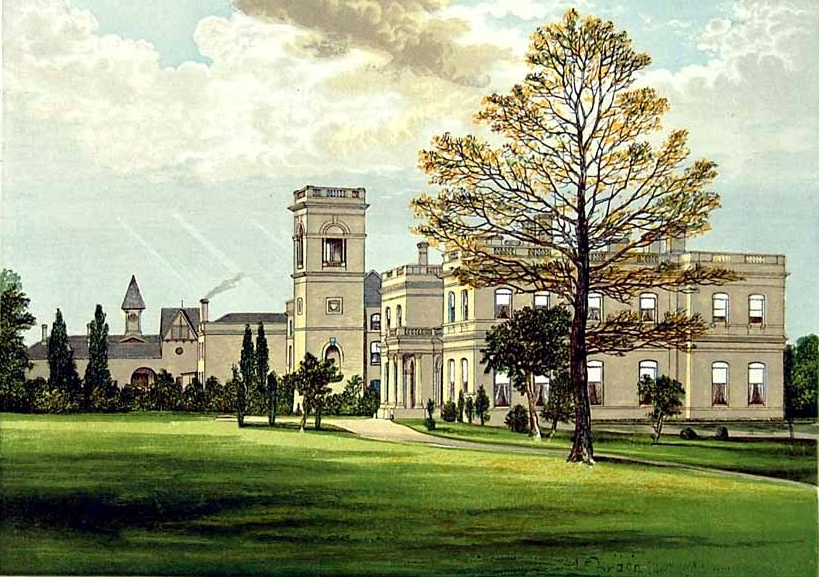
Stowlangtoft Hall, 1880

Sir Walter Rawlinson (29 May 1734 – 13 March 1805) was a British banker and politician who sat in the House of Commons from 1774 to 1790.

== Early life ==
Rawlinson was the son of Sir Thomas Rawlinson and his wife Dorothea Ray, daughter of Rev. Richard Ray, vicar of Haughley, Suffolk. He was baptised at All Hallows Staining at 12 days old on 9 June 1734. His father was a London merchant who became Lord Mayor of London in 1753–4. Rawlinson was educated at Bury St Edmunds Grammar School in 1744 and was admitted at Trinity College, Cambridge on 18 January 1753, aged 18. In 1752 he entered Lincoln's Inn to study law. He married Mary Ladbroke, daughter of Sir Robert Ladbroke on 2 February 1769. He succeeded his father on 2 December 1769 and inherited Stowlangtoft Hall which had been purchased by his father in 1760.

In 1771 Rawlinson became a partner with his father-in-law in the firm of Ladbroke, Robinson & Co., bankers. He was an Alderman for Dowgate, in the City of London, from 1773 and was knighted on 4 March 1774.

== Political career ==
Rawlinson was a friend of Lord Sandwich, who returned him as Member of Parliament for Queenborough on the Admiralty interest in the 1774 general election. In the House of Commons he supported North's Administration, but took little part in politics and apparently never spoke in the House. He was equally uninterested in City politics and in 1777 resigned as alderman. He does not seem to have used his position as an MP to secure financial advantages for his firm. He was re-elected MP for Queenborough without contest in 1780. He was a member of the St. Alban's Tavern group which tried to bring together Fox and Pitt in 1784. In 1784 he was returned as MP for Huntingdon on Sandwich's interest. He did not stand at the 1790 general election

== Later life ==
Rawlinson was also president of Bridewell and Bethlehem Hospitals. He died without issue at Devonshire Place, London, on 13 March 1805, aged 70.

Parliament of Great Britain
Preceded by Sir Charles Frederick; Captain Sir Peircy Brett	Member of Parliament for Queenborough; 1774–1784; With: Sir Charles Frederick	Succeeded by John Clater Aldridge; Captain George Bowyer
Preceded by Hugh Palliser; The Lord Mulgrave	Member of Parliament for Huntingdon; 1784–1790; With: Lancelot Brown 1784-1787; John Willett Payne 1787-1790	Succeeded by Hon. John George Montagu; John Willett Payne
