= Daniel Bayne =

Daniel Bayne (c 1730 – 1769) was a Scottish born merchant and trader who came to Quebec City after the British Conquest.

Bayne became partners with another Scottish merchant, William Brymer. In 1763, they were granted a four-year monopoly for the fishing post of Cape Charles on the Labrador coast by Governor James Murray. The same year, a royal proclamation put the Labrador coast under the governor of Newfoundland and, in 1765, Hugh Palliser ordered colonials barred from the coast. This caused a large financial loss for those affected and a battle ensued for compensation. The matter was resolved in 1770, too late for Daniel Bayne who had died the previous year.

These events were important in that the British government recognized the Quebec merchants rights of property and residence on the Labrador coast. In 1774, the coast was returned to Quebec, a recognition that the interests of Canadians were to be upheld. Bayne and Brymer had won against Palliser and established that injuries done to the rights of property must be adequately compensated.
