= John Willett Payne =

Rear-Admiral John Willett Payne
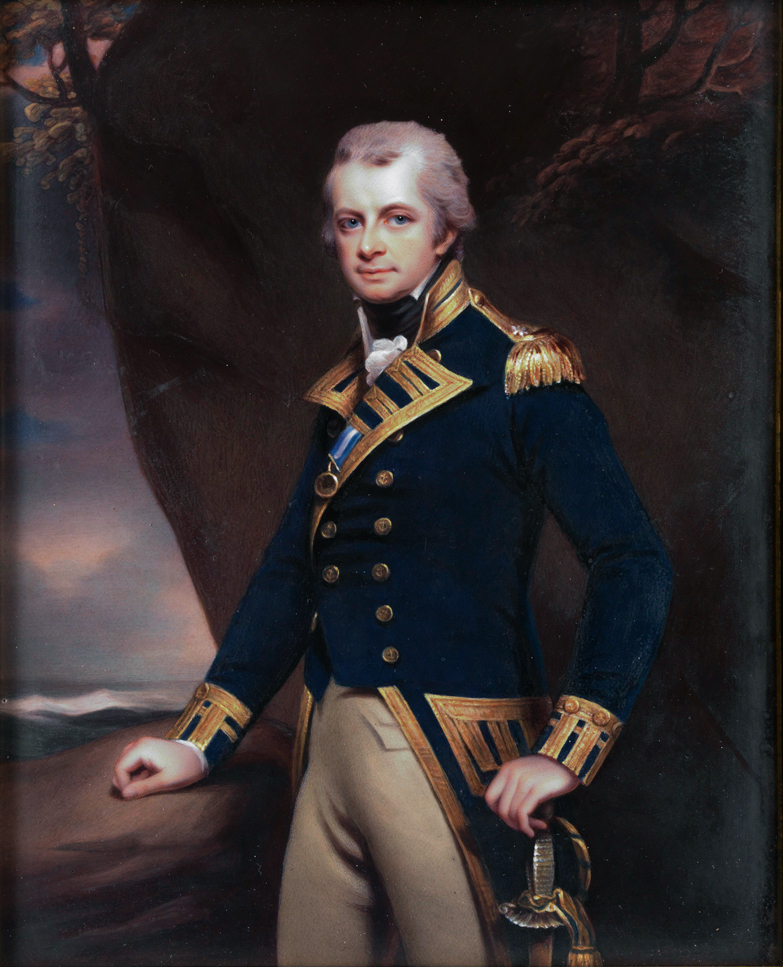
- John Willett Payne (Henry Bone, 1804)
- Born: 23 April 1752; St Kitts, Leeward Islands
- Died: 17 November 1803 (aged 51); Royal Naval Hospital, Greenwich
- Military career
- Allegiance: United Kingdom
- Branch: Royal Navy
- Service years: 1767 to 1803
- Rank: Rear-Admiral
- Conflicts: American Revolutionary War; Battle of Sullivan's Island; Battle of Lake Pontchartrain; French Revolutionary Wars; Glorious First of June
- Other work: MP for Huntingdon, 1787–1796

John Willett Payne (23 April 1752 – 17 November 1803) was an officer of the Royal Navy who also served as a close friend, advisor and courtier to Prince George before and during his first regency. Payne was notorious as a rake and scoundrel, but was also a Member of Parliament and noted for his bravery in several military actions during the American Revolutionary War and the French Revolutionary Wars. Out of favour in his later years, Payne was reconciled with the Prince in 1799, but died whilst still in the service aged 51, from an illness which developed during blockade operations in the Western Approaches.

== Early career ==
Payne was born in 1752, son of Ralph Payne, Chief Justice of St Kitts and his wife Margaret née Gallwey. His elder brother Ralph Payne would later become Baron Lavington. Payne was educated at Dr. Bracken's Academy in Greenwich and later attended the Royal Naval Academy at Portsmouth to train as an officer. During this time he became friends with Hugh Seymour Conway, with whom he had a lifelong friendship and close naval partnership. In 1769 he left the academy to join HMS Quebec.

Quebec served in the West Indies but after only a few months Payne moved to the ship of the line HMS Montagu before returning to Britain in 1773 aboard the sloop HMS Falcon. Payne briefly joined HMS Egmont but soon was attached to the large frigate HMS Rainbow for a cruise to the Guinea Coast. In 1775 he was back in England, where he passed for lieutenant aboard Egmont.

== American Revolutionary War ==
With the outbreak of the American Revolutionary War in 1775, Payne joined HMS Bristol and participated in the Battle of Sullivan's Island under the command of Sir Peter Parker. Shortly afterward, Payne joined HMS Eagle in New York City to serve as Lord Howe's aide-de-camp. In 1777, Payne joined HMS Brune and the following year transferred to HMS Phoenix in which he participated in numerous coastal operations on the Eastern Seaboard.

Payne returned to Britain aboard HMS Roebuck and in Britain served aboard HMS Romney. He impressed Commodore George Johnstone in this duty and in 1779 was made commander of the sloop HMS Cormorant. The following year, Payne was promoted to post captain and took over the prize frigate HMS Artois which he commanded in European waters. He was also embroiled in a scandal when he was accused of impressing Portuguese citizens out of merchant ships in the Tagus.

In 1781, Payne sailed to the Jamaica station in HMS Enterprize and the following year took over HMS Leander. In Leander, Payne fought a duel with a much larger enemy ship in which both vessels were severely damaged. The identity of the other ship was never established, but Payne was given the 80-gun HMS Princess Amelia as a reward. At the war's conclusion, Payne returned to Europe and Princess Amelia was paid off.

== Royal service ==
During the early 1780s, Payne had formed a friendship with the rakish heir to the throne, George, Prince of Wales. After acting as companion to Lord Northington on a Grand Tour of Europe in 1785, Payne returned to the service of the Prince as his private secretary and Keeper of the Privy Seal. Payne also ran the Prince's household and lent money to Lord Sandwich, who was obliged to obtain for Payne the parliamentary seat of Huntingdon, which he held from 1787 to 1796. During this period he was appointed captain of HMS Phoenix but never served at sea, drawing the pay whilst pursuing his other duties.

Following the succession crisis of 1788 when King George III was struck down by porphyria, Payne was an active supporter of the Prince of Wales's regency. Payne corresponded closely with other supporters but also participated in the Prince's frequent and extravagant masques and entertainments. He also helped conspire in the Prince's illegal marriage to Maria Fitzherbert and was once rebuked by the Duchess of Gordon in the terms "You little, insignificant, good-for-nothing, upstart, pert chattering puppy" after being overheard making insulting comments about the Queen, Charlotte of Mecklenburg-Strelitz.

== French Revolutionary Wars ==
The King's recovery, combined with the outbreak of the French Revolutionary Wars, called Payne to sea once more. Taking command of HMS Russell in 1793, Payne joined the Channel Fleet under Lord Howe and the following year participated in the Atlantic campaign of May 1794. Howe was attempting to chase down a French fleet guarding a grain convoy in the mid-Atlantic and after a month of sparring, caught the French on 28 May. Payne's ship was with the flying squadron under Thomas Pasley sent to engage the French and Russell fought well in this action and the following day. In the culminating engagement, the Glorious First of June, Payne's ship was heavily engaged and fought a succession of French ships, inflicting severe damage and making a great contribution to the eventual victory.

In the aftermath of the action, Payne was rewarded with a gold medal and in 1795 was tasked with escorting the Prince of Wales's official wife, Caroline of Brunswick to Britain. Payne became friends with Caroline, and the bitter marriage between her and the Prince angered Payne. In addition, Payne had earned the enmity of Frances Villiers, Countess of Jersey and these factors combined to alienate him from the Prince, who dismissed Payne from all his offices in 1796.

The same year, Payne took command of HMS Impetueux, one of the ships he had captured at the Glorious First of June two years before. In her Payne led a squadron the blockade of Brest until 1799, seeing no significant action and suffering from increasing ill-health as a result of the arduous service. In January 1799, Payne retired ashore and was reconciled with the Prince, who described their relationship as "an old and steady friendship of upwards of twenty years standing". In February Payne was made rear-admiral, but it was becoming clear that he was no longer fit for sea service.

Retiring to the prestige post of treasurer of the Royal Naval Hospital at Greenwich, Payne was actually a patient at the hospital for his last years, and plans for him to move into one of the Prince's residences at Carlton House came to nothing. Payne died in 1803 at the hospital from the strain of his long-service, and was buried at the Church of St. Margaret, Westminster. He never married and had no children, however had been one of the lovers of Emma Lyons who later became Lady Hamilton.

== Notes ==
Parliament of Great Britain
Preceded by Sir Walter Rawlinson; Lancelot Brown	Member of Parliament for Huntingdon; 1787–1796; With: Sir Walter Rawlinson (1787–1790); Hon. John George Montagu (1790); Henry Speed (1790–1796)	Succeeded by William Henry Fellowes; John Calvert
