= HDMS Odin =

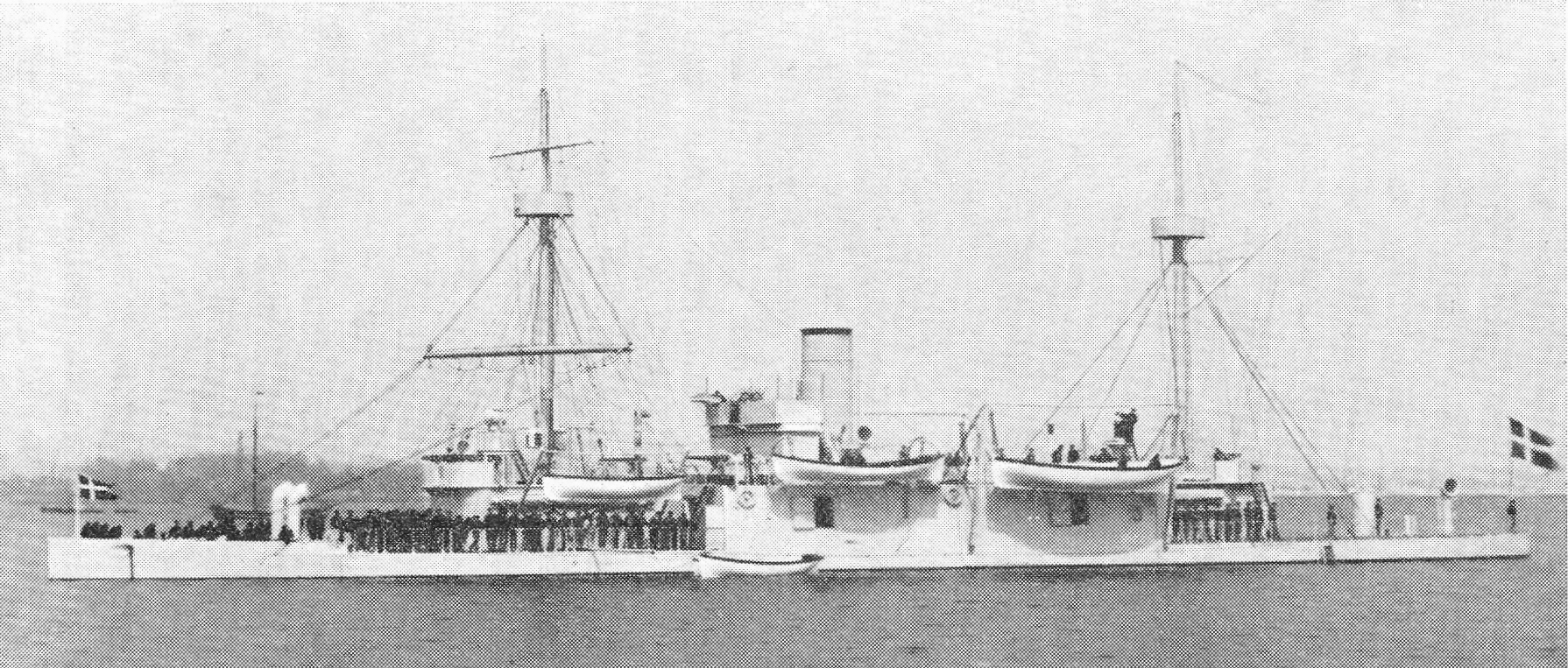
- Odin

History

Denmark
- Name: Odin
- Namesake: Odin
- Builder: Naval Dockyard, Copenhagen
- Laid down: 13 April 1871
- Launched: 12 December 1872
- Commissioned: 7 September 1874
- Decommissioned: 12 June 1912
- Fate: Scrapped 1912

General characteristics
- Type: Central battery ironclad
- Displacement: 3,170 tonnes (3,120 long tons)
- Length: 73.4 m (240 ft 10 in)
- Beam: 14.78 m (48 ft 6 in)
- Draft: 5 m (16 ft)
- Installed power: 2,300 ihp (1,700 kW)
- Propulsion: 1 shaft, 1 trunk steam engine
- Speed: 12 knots (22 km/h; 14 mph)
- Range: 1,200 nmi (2,200 km; 1,400 mi) at 9 knots (17 km/h; 10 mph)
- Complement: 206
- Armament: 4 × single Armstrong 254 mm (10 in) rifled muzzle-loading guns; 6 × single 76-millimeter (3.0 in) guns
- Armor: Belt: 102–303 mm (4.0–11.9 in); Battery: 178 mm (7.0 in); Deck: 26 mm (1.0 in)

The Danish ironclad Odin was a central battery ironclad built for the Royal Danish Navy in the 1870s. She was scrapped in 1912.

== Description ==
The ship was 73.4 meters (240 ft 10 in) long overall with a beam of 14.78 meters (48 ft 6 in). She had a draft of 5 meters (16 ft 5 in) and displaced 3,170 metric tons (3,120 long tons). Her crew consisted of 206 officers and enlisted men. She was fitted with a retractable spur ram in the bow. The ship was reconstruction in 1898 to give her main guns better arcs of fire and an armored conning tower was added.

Odin had one horizontal direct-acting steam engine, built by Burmeister & Wain, that drove a single propeller shaft. The engine was rated at a 2,300 indicated horsepower (1,700 kW) for a designed speed of 12 knots (22 km/h; 14 mph). The ship carried a maximum of 177 metric tons (174 long tons; 195 short tons) of coal that gave her a range of 1,200 nmi (2,200 km; 1,400 mi) at 9 knots (17 km/h; 10 mph).

She was initially armed with four single Armstrong 254-millimeter (10.0 in) rifled muzzle-loading (RML) guns mounted in the armored citadel and six 76-millimeter (3.0 in) guns. In 1883, the 76-millimeter guns were replaced by four 87-millimeter (3.4 in) rifled breech-loading guns. The 254-millimeter guns were later converted into 16-caliber breech-loading guns by Krupp.

The ship had a complete waterline armored belt that ranged in thickness from 102 to 303 millimeters (4.0 to 11.9 in). The battery was protected by 178-millimeter (7.0 in) armor plates. The deck armor was 26 millimeters (1.0 in) thick. The conning tower was protected by armor plates 142 millimeters (5.6 in) thick.

== Construction and career ==
Odin, named for the eponymous god from Norse legend, was laid down by the Naval Dockyard in Copenhagen on 13 April 1871, launched on 12 December 1872 and completed on 7 September 1874.

In August 1895, Odin led the summer maneuver squadron, which also included the coastal defense ship Gorm and the gunboats Grønland, Falster, Grønland, Møn, and Little Belt. Odin served as the flagship of Rear Admiral Kock. The squadron was established on 7 August, and it was joined by the cruisers Fyen, Dagmar, Abaslon, and Diana, along with several small torpedo boats and other small craft. The training exercises lasted until 20 September.

She was stricken from the Navy List on 12 June 1912 and sold for scrap. The ship was broken up in the Netherlands.
