= Hugh Palliser =

Royal Navy officer, politician and colonial administrator (1723–1796)

Admiral of the White Sir Hugh Palliser Bt
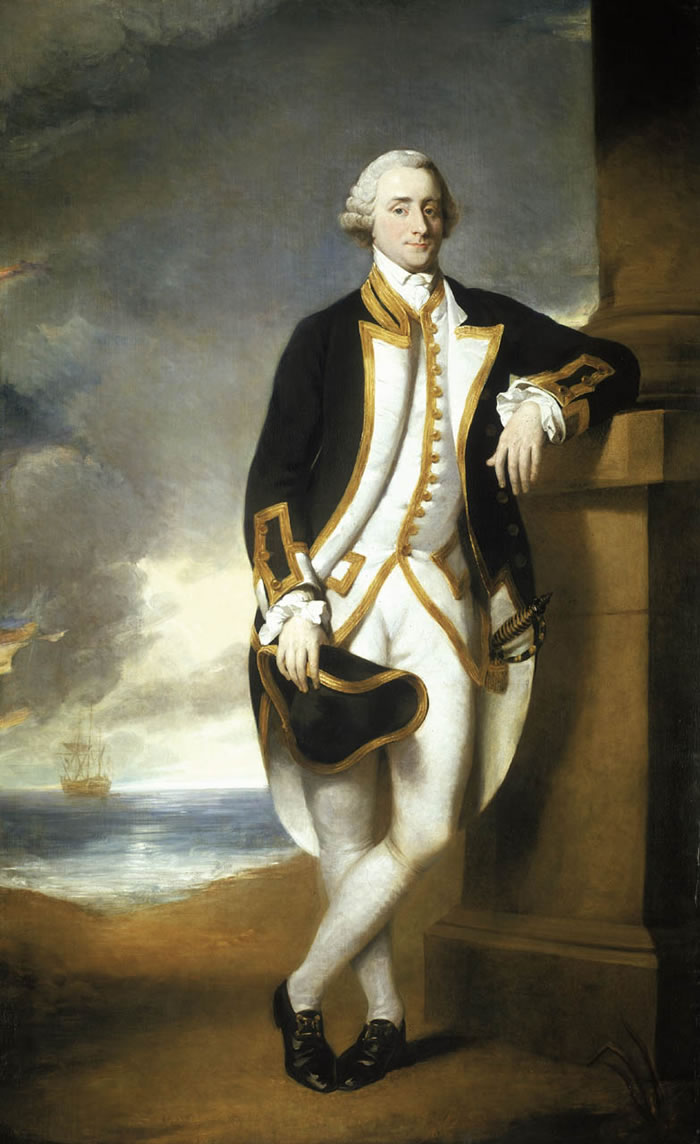
- Portrait attributed to George Dance the Younger, c. 1775

Governor of Greenwich Hospital
- In office 1780–1796
- Monarch: George III
- Preceded by: Sir Charles Hardy
- Succeeded by: Samuel Hood

First Naval Lord
- In office 1775–1779
- Monarch: George III
- Preceded by: Augustus Hervey
- Succeeded by: Robert Man

Controller of the Navy
- In office 1770–1775
- Monarch: George III
- Preceded by: George Cockburne
- Succeeded by: Maurice Suckling

Member of the Great Britain Parliament for Scarborough
- In office 1774–1779 Serving with George Carpenter
- Preceded by: Sir James Pennyman; George Carpenter
- Succeeded by: Charles Phipps; George Carpenter

Member of the Great Britain Parliament for Huntingdon
- In office 1780–1784 Serving with Constantine Phipps
- Preceded by: Sir George Wombwell; Constantine Phipps
- Succeeded by: Sir Walter Rawlinson; Lancelot Brown

23rd Commodore Governor of Newfoundland
- In office 1764–1768
- Monarch: George III
- Preceded by: Thomas Graves
- Succeeded by: John Byron

Personal details
- Born: 26 February 1723 Kirk Deighton, Yorkshire, England
- Died: 19 March 1796 (aged 73) Chalfont St Giles, Buckinghamshire, England
- Military career
- Allegiance: Great Britain
- Branch: Royal Navy
- Service years: 1735–1796
- Rank: Admiral of the White
- Commands: HMS Weazel; HMS Captain; HMS Sutherland; HMS Sheerness; HMS Yarmouth; HMS Seahorse; HMS Bristol; HMS Eagle; HMS Shrewsbury; HMS Guernsey; Newfoundland Station; Comptroller of the Navy; Lord Commissioner of the Admiralty; Greenwich Hospital
- Conflicts: War of the Austrian Succession; Battle of Toulon (1744); Seven Years' War; Raid on St Malo; Battle of the Plains of Abraham; American War of Independence; Battle of Ushant (1778)

Viceregal styles of Sir Hugh Palliser
- Reference style: His Excellency
- Spoken style: Your Excellency

Admiral of the White Sir Hugh Palliser, 1st Baronet (26 February 1723^{[a]} – 19 March 1796) was a Royal Navy officer, politician and colonial administrator. As captain of the 58-gun HMS Eagle, he engaged and defeated the French 50-gun Duc d'Aquitain off Ushant in May 1757 during the Seven Years' War. Palliser went on to serve as Commodore Governor of Newfoundland, then Controller of the Navy and then First Naval Lord. During the American Revolutionary War he came into a famous dispute with Augustus Keppel over his conduct as third-in-command of the Channel Fleet at the inconclusive Battle of Ushant in July 1778; the dispute led to Palliser being court-martialled; he was acquitted. In retirement Palliser became Governor of Greenwich Hospital.

== Early life ==
Palliser was the only son of Hugh Palliser and Mary Robinson and was born at Kirk Deighton, in the West Riding of Yorkshire (now in North Yorkshire). The family had estates in Yorkshire and Ireland. His parents died when he was still young, so he and his sisters were (probably) raised by relatives on his mother's side. He entered the Royal Navy in 1735 as a midshipman on HMS Aldborough, which was captained by his uncle Nicholas Robinson. He followed his uncle to HMS Kennington in 1737, and then to HMS Tiger and HMS Essex.

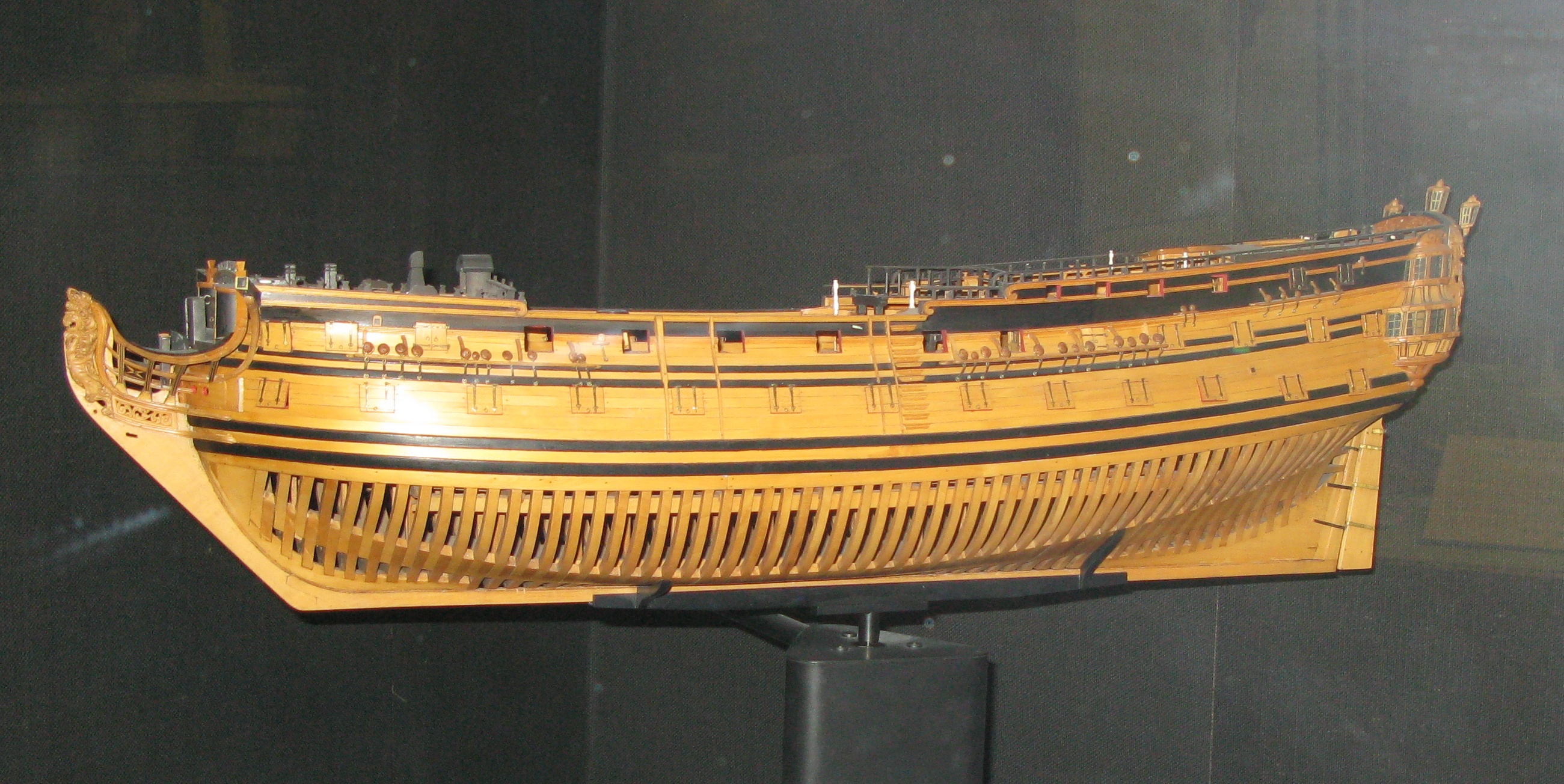
Model of HMS Captain, which Palliser captained from 1746 to 1747

Palliser passed his lieutenant's examination on 12 May 1741 and was promoted to the rank on 18 September 1741. He continued to serve aboard Essex, at first under Robinson, and after he was superseded, under Captain Richard Norris, the son of Sir John Norris. In February 1746 he was placed in command of HMS Weazel. On 25 November 1746 he was promoted to post-captain and appointed the captain of HMS Captain, sailing for the West Indies with the broad pennant of Commodore Edward Legge. Legge died on 19 September 1747, and Palliser transferred to HMS Sutherland. Six months later an accidental fire in that ship's arms chest wounded Palliser; a ball entered his back and exited his groin; another ball struck his right hip; a third ball struck his left shoulder. Two other men were killed in the explosion. Palliser returned to England to recover, but remained lame in his left leg, and suffered perpetual and sometimes excruciating pain to which his death was eventually attributed.

He returned to active service in December 1748 and was appointed to command the frigate HMS Sheerness, sailing her to the East Indies to bring news of the treaty of Aix-la-Chapelle which concluded Britain's role in the War of the Austrian Succession. Palliser was then part of Edward Boscawen's squadron on the Coromandel coast from July 1749, returning to Britain to pay off Sheerness in April 1750. As an alternative to half-pay he took up appointment as captain of HMS Yarmouth, the guardship at Chatham. Shortly afterwards he was moved to the much smaller 20-gun HMS Seahorse, A difficulty arose when Scottish authorities accused a sailor from Seahorse of circulating a forged letter of indenture, in order to receive greater pay. The sailor took refuge aboard the ship, and Palliser refused to hand him over. Palliser was thereupon arrested in the sailor's place and held for several days in the Tolbooth Jail in Edinburgh. He was eventually released by order of the Scottish Lords of Session, who invoked their authority to supersede that of the judge of the vice-admiralty court in Edinburgh who had sought to commit Palliser for trial.

In early 1753 he was appointed captain of the 50-gun HMS Bristol, but soon afterwards returned to command a convoy comprising Seahorse and Nightingale, with orders to protect transports being used to move two British Army regiments to the Colonies immediately prior to what would become the Seven Years' War against France. Palliser sailed in January 1755, directing the convoy in a long southern arc across the Atlantic, as far as the Tropic of Cancer. This represented a substantial deviation from the traditional and more direct easterly route, but enabled the convoy to travel in calmer weather and avoid the risk of losing transports to storms. The unorthodox navigation won Palliser some praise from British authorities.

== Seven Years' War ==
The ongoing friction between Britain and France ignited into open warfare in 1755. In October of that year Palliser was placed in command of the 58-gun HMS Eagle. That ship engaged and defeated the French 50-gun Duc d'Aquitain off Ushant on 30 May 1757. After that battle Eagle returned to port for repairs, and Palliser moved to command of the 74-gun HMS Shrewsbury, part of the Channel Fleet under George Anson.

In that ship in July 1758 he grounded and captured several French ships near Brest. In 1759 Palliser participated in the successful British capture of Quebec City, commanding the seamen who landed and took possession of Lower Town. In 1760 Palliser was sent to the Mediterranean Sea to chase a small French squadron which had slipped out of the port at Toulon. He bottled the French boats up at several ports in Turkey. In 1761 Palliser captured a Danish merchant ship from a small convoy off Sardinia, escorted by the Dano-Norwegian ship of the line HDMS Grønland, in a shrewd operation, where no shots were fired. It was a precarious operation, as Denmark-Norway was neutral in the war, but Palliser had intelligence information informing him that the Danish ships were in fact shipping goods from the Levant to Marseille for French merchants, a practice, which ended after the incident. In 1762 Palliser commanded a four-ship armada dispatched to retake St. John's, Newfoundland, but the area was already in British control when he arrived following the Battle of Signal Hill.

== Governor of Newfoundland and subsequent service ==
In 1764 Palliser was named Governor and Commander-in-Chief at Newfoundland. He had under his command the 50-gun HMS Guernsey, and several frigates. His forces encountered a similar French force which was ostensibly regulating their remaining fishing grounds in the area, but Palliser perceived that they had altered their maps to show they controlled more area than had been agreed upon in the negotiations which ended the conflict in this area. The French minister in London used this clash to complain to the British government against Palliser, but he was able to produce sufficient maps and supporting material to convince his superiors of his correct actions.

Palliser actively supported the fisheries as a source of trained seamen for the Royal Navy. As such he took active steps to enforce the provisions of Treaty of Paris (1763) restricting French access to their specific fishing rights. He also sought to restrict further settlement of Newfoundland, so to encourage the British-based industry.

Palliser remained Governor of Newfoundland until 1768. In 1770 Commodore Palliser was appointed Comptroller of the Navy, and in that same year was elected an elder brother of the Trinity House, which oversees British lighthouses and provides general expertise to the government on naval matters.

In 1773 Palliser was made Baronet. In 1774 he was elected to Parliament for the Borough of Scarborough. On 31 March 1775 he achieved flag rank when promoted to Rear-Admiral of the Blue. Under the Earl of Sandwich he joined the Board of Admiralty as First Naval Lord in April 1775 and received the sinecure of Lieutenant-General of Marines, being promoted to Rear-Admiral of the White on 7 December. Palliser was promoted to Rear-Admiral of the Red on 23 January 1778 and Vice-Admiral of the Blue six days later. He stood down from the Admiralty Board in September 1779.

== Palliser's Act ==
Newfoundland Fisheries Act 1775
- Act of Parliament
- Parliament of Great Britain
- Long title: An act for the encouragement of the Fisheries carried on, from Great Britain, Ireland, and the British Dominions in Europe, and for securing the return of the fishermen, sailors, and others employed in the said fisheries, to the ports thereof, at the end of the fishing season.
- Citation: 15 Geo. 3. c. 31
- Territorial extent: Great Britain

Dates
- Royal assent: 26 May 1775
- Commencement: 1 January 1776 (Note: Section 1.)
- Repealed: 21 August 1871
Other legislation
Amended by	Customs Law Repeal Act 1825
Repealed by	Statute Law Revision Act 1871

Status: Repealed

Text of statute as originally enacted

With his involvement in fisheries and seamen training, in 1775 Palliser initiated legislation to encourage and regulate ship fisheries in Newfoundland. The act is commonly known as Palliser's Act (15 Geo. 3. c. 31), but also called the Newfoundland Fisheries Act 1775; its long title is An act for the encouragement of the Fisheries carried on, from Great Britain, Ireland, and the British Dominions in Europe, and for securing the return of the fishermen, sailors, and others employed in the said fisheries, to the ports thereof, at the end of the fishing season.

Historian Sean Cadigan, author of Hope and Deception in Conception Bay (1995), has since linked Palliser's Act with the high-valuation of women's labour in 18th Century Newfoundland. Given that Palliser's Act required producers to pre-pay their labourers for the fishing season, producers developed little incentive to hire outside of their families: hired labour was high risk because pre-paid wages reduced producers' margin for gain (or loss). As such, Palliser's Act inspired the merger of household labour with the market, making women's work essential to the economic success of the colony.

== American War of Independence and controversy with Keppel ==
In 1778 Palliser was appointed to the Channel Fleet under Admiral of the Blue Augustus Keppel. On 27 July 1778 in the First Battle of Ushant, the Channel Fleet fought an inconclusive battle with the French fleet. The battle's outcome led to personal acrimony between Palliser and Keppel, resulted in their individual courts martial and increased divisiveness in the Navy. Palliser was forced to resign from Parliament and his other posts.

The July 1778 Battle of Ushant came about when the British fleet found that it had become located between the French ships and their home ports. Seeing the sudden advantage, Keppel ordered that a battle line be formed and an attack made. Palliser's ship HMS Formidable was badly damaged in the ensuing fray, and when Keppel hoisted the signal to reform the battle line, Palliser's division was some distance away, so a frigate was dispatched to give the instruction. Due to the battle damage, Palliser's division was unable to comply until later in the evening, when it was too late to continue the battle, and the French withdrew to Brest. Both sides later claimed victory, and Keppel issued a dispatch which commended all his officers for their conduct in the action.

Palliser heard rumours that Keppel had intimated in private conversations that Palliser's absence had been the cause of the inconclusive outcome, so Palliser wrote a paper defending his actions. An anonymous letter to a London newspaper accused Palliser of disobedience in the battle, and he called on Keppel to refute the allegation. When no public refutation was forthcoming, Palliser demanded that a court martial be held to try Keppel on charges of "misconduct and neglect of duty" (which carried a death sentence if proved). Keppel's court martial was held at Portsmouth in January 1779, and he was acquitted after 27 days, the court finding that the charges against him had been brought with malicious intent and were unfounded. The court-martial outcome meant ruin for Palliser. He was defended by Lord Sandwich, but still had to resign from Parliament and as Lieutenant-General of the Marines. He then demanded that a court martial be convened against him so that he could present his version of events during his defence. The court martial was convened, and he was acquitted after 21 days. However, he was censured in that he had failed to inform his superior officer of the battle damage in a timely manner.

After his acquittal Palliser hoped to be reinstated as Lieutenant-General of Marines. Instead, in 1780 he was appointed Governor of Greenwich Hospital by Lord Sandwich, and was again elected to Parliament for Huntingdon (1780–1784). Palliser was promoted to Vice-Admiral of the White on 26 September 1780 and Admiral of the Blue on 24 September 1787.

== Association with James Cook ==
James Cook, a fellow Yorkshireman, first served under Palliser as Master's Mate of HMS Eagle from 1755 to 1758. Palliser would have supported his elevation to Master in 1757. Both were present at the siege of Quebec where Cook charted the approach to the city and the landing area. Following the Treaty of Paris, Cook was charged with surveying Newfoundland. As Governor, Palliser actively supported Cook's work and assisted in the publication of his acclaimed map of Newfoundland. During his term as Comptroller, Palliser supported Cook's first command of exploration in 1768, and his subsequent voyages. Cook named Cape Palliser, Palliser Bay and Palliser Isles after his "worthy friend". On Cook's death, Palliser erected a memorial to Cook at the Vache, his estate near Chalfont St Giles in Buckinghamshire.

== Death ==
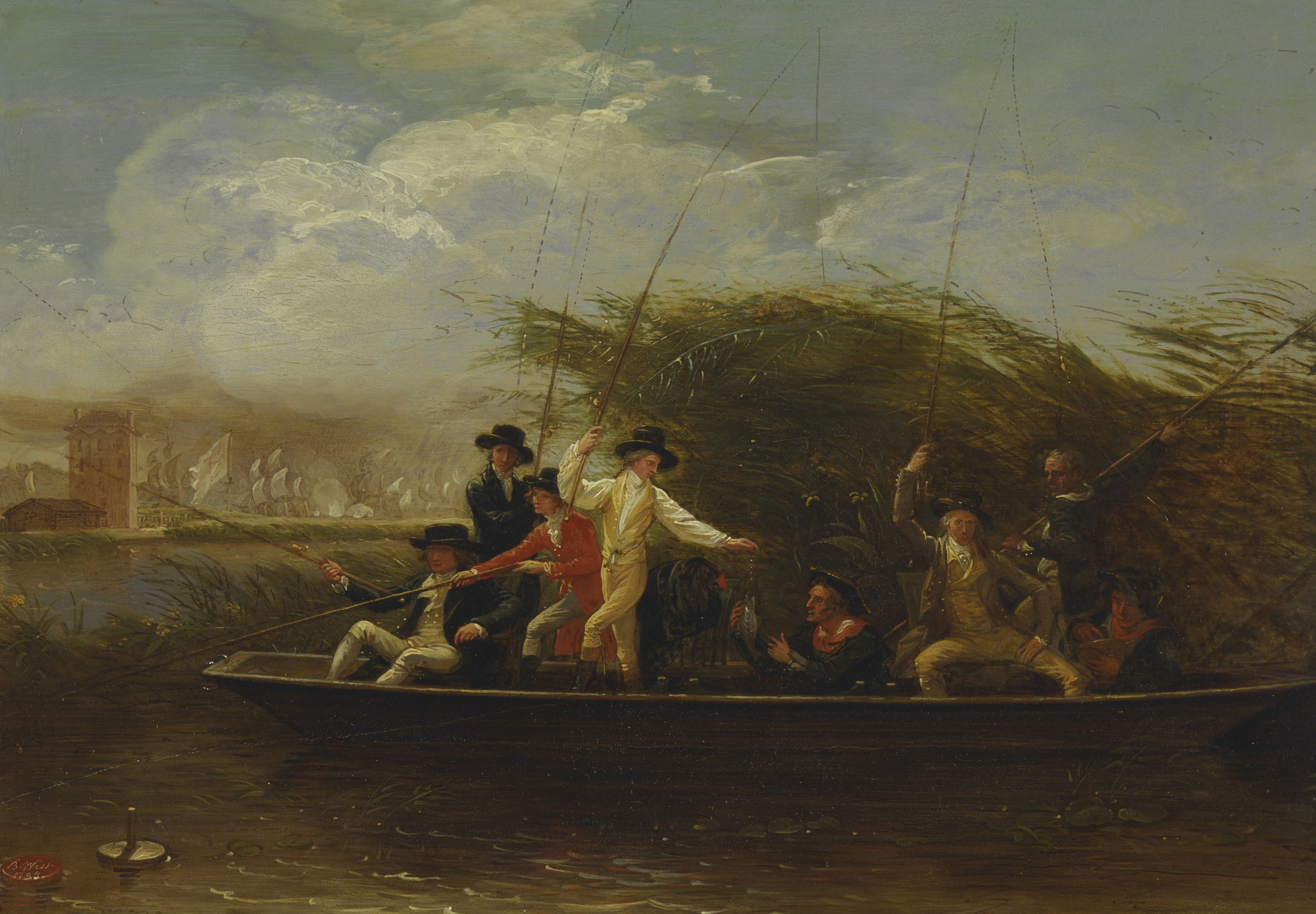
Gentlemen Fishing (Benjamin West, 1794). Palliser is shown third from right.

Palliser was promoted to his final rank of Admiral of the White on 1 February 1793 and died on 19 March 1796 at the Vache, and was buried seven days later at the parish church of St Giles where there is a memorial to him. The Palliser Baronetcy passed to his great-nephew Hugh Palliser Walters who assumed by Royal Licence dated 18 January 1798 the surname and arms of Palliser. Palliser's illegitimate son George Thomas inherited the estate of the Vache.

== Notes ==
a. Some sources use the Old Style dating system, in use in Britain until 1752, for Palliser's birth. As under this system the new year did not begin until 25 March, Palliser's birth was recorded as being in 1722. The article Admiral Sir HUGH PALLISER, Bt 1723–1796, taken from Charnock, J. Biographia navalis . . from 1660 to the present time (6 volumes), states that Palliser was born "on 26 February 1722" (although the title of the article indicates he was born in 1723). The Royal Naval Museum website, accessed 6 August 2009, provides a biography, Biography: Hugh Palliser, which states that Palliser "was born on 26th February 1723". The Government House website, accessed 6 August 2009, provides a biography, Palliser, Sir Hugh (1722–1796). It states that Palliser "was born ... on February 22, 1722. The Dictionary of Canadian Biography Online, accessed 6 August 2009 provides a biography, which states: PALLISER (Pallisser), Sir HUGH, "b. 22 Feb. 1722/23". Contemporary scholarship by the Oxford Dictionary of National Biography places his birth date as 26 February 1723.

== Sources ==
- Cadigan, Sean (1995). Hope and Deception in Conception Bay. University of Toronto Press. ISBN 978-0802075680.
- Charnock, J. Biographia navalis, V. pp. 483–96.
- Hunt, R.M. (1844). The life of Sir Hugh Palliser. London.
- Robson, John (2009). Captain Cook's War and Peace: The Royal Navy Years 1755–1768. University of New South Wales Press. p. 22. ISBN 9781742231099.
- Rodger, N.A.M. (1979). The Admiralty. Offices of State. Lavenham: T. Dalton Ltd. ISBN 0900963948.
- Winfield, Rif (2007). British Warships of the Age of Sail 1714–1792: Design, Construction, Careers and Fates. Seaforth. ISBN 9781844157006.

Military offices
Preceded by George Cockburne	Comptroller of the Navy; 1770–1775	Succeeded by Maurice Suckling
Preceded by Augustus Hervey	First Naval Lord; 1775–1779	Succeeded by Robert Man
Preceded by Sir Charles Hardy	Governor, Greenwich Hospital; 1780–1796	Succeeded by Viscount Hood
Parliament of Great Britain
Preceded by Sir James Pennyman, Bt; The Earl of Tyrconnel	Member of Parliament for Scarborough; 1774–1779; With: The Earl of Tyrconnel	Succeeded by The Earl of Tyrconnel; Charles Phipps
Preceded by George Wombwell; The Lord Mulgrave	Member of Parliament for Huntingdon; 1780–1784; With: The Lord Mulgrave	Succeeded by Sir Walter Rawlinson; Launcelot Brown
Political offices
Preceded by Thomas Graves	Commodore Governor of Newfoundland; 1764–1768	Succeeded by John Byron
Baronetage of Great Britain
New title	Baronet (of The Vache); 1773–1796	Succeeded by Hugh Palliser
