= First Sea Lord =

Professional head of the UK's Royal Navy

First Sea Lord and Chief of the Naval Staff
- Admiral's command flag

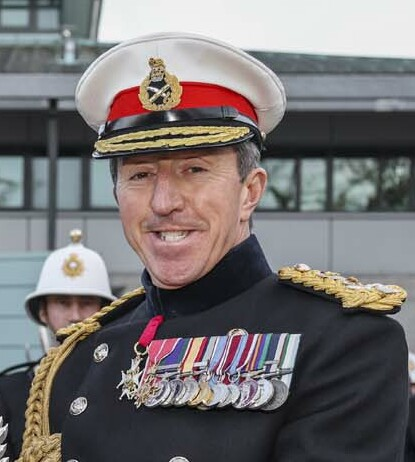
- Incumbent; General Sir Gwyn Jenkins since 27 May 2025
- Ministry of Defence; Royal Navy
- Style: General
- Abbreviation: 1SL/CNS
- Member of: Defence Council; Admiralty Board; Chiefs of Staff Committee
- Reports to: Chief of the Defence Staff
- Nominator: Secretary of State for Defence
- Appointer: The Monarch; On the advice of the Prime Minister, subject to formal approval by the King-in-Council
- Term length: Not fixed; typically 3–4 years
- Formation: Senior Naval Lord (1689–1771); First Naval Lord (1771–1904); First Sea Lord (from 1904)
- First holder: Admiral Arthur Herbert (as Senior Naval Lord); Admiral of the Fleet Sir John Fisher (as First Sea Lord)
- Deputy: Deputy First Sea Lord (1917-1919, 1942-1946); Vice Chief of the Naval Staff (1941–1946); Deputy Chief of the Naval Staff
- Website: Official website

First Sea Lord, officially First Sea Lord and Chief of the Naval Staff (1SL/CNS), is the title of the professional head of His Majesty's Naval Service. The CNS is a member of the Chiefs of Staff Committee and, thereby, a military advisor to the National Security Council, the prime minister and the monarch. The post is currently held by General Sir Gwyn Jenkins.

Originally titled the "Senior Naval Lord to the Board of Admiralty" when the post was created in 1689, the office was re-styled First Naval Lord in 1771. The concept of a professional "First Naval Lord" was introduced in 1805, and the title of the office was changed to First Sea Lord on the appointment of Sir John "Jackie" Fisher in 1904. Since 1923, the First Sea Lord has been a member of the Chiefs of Staff Committee; they now sit on the Defence Council and the Admiralty Board.

== Responsibilities ==
The First Sea Lord is the professional head of the Royal Navy and a member of the Defence Council. He is responsible to the secretary of state for the fighting effectiveness, efficiency and morale of the Naval Service. As a member of the Defence Council, the First Sea Lord supports the Secretary of State in the management and direction of the Armed Forces through prerogative and statutory powers. As a member of the Chiefs of Staff Committee, he advises CDS on maritime strategy and policy. He has a collective responsibility for providing strategic direction to the department, managing performance and ensuring that defence delivers the required outputs.

== History ==
Lords Admiral were appointed from the 15th century; they were later styled Lords High Admiral until the 18th century, and Lords Commissioners of the Admiralty from the 17th century, as the governors of the English and later British Royal Navy. From 1683 to 1684, there were seven paid Commissioners, and one unpaid supernumerary Commissioner. The number varied between five and seven Commissioners through the 18th century. The standing of all the Commissioners was in theory the same, although the First Commissioner or First Lord exercised an ascendancy over his colleagues from an early date.

The generally recognized office of Senior Naval Lord to the Board of Admiralty was established on 8 March 1689, with the first incumbent being Admiral Arthur Herbert; he was also First Lord of the Admiralty. On 20 January 1690 Admiral Herbert was succeeded by Admiral Sir John Chicheley under First Lord of Admiralty Thomas Herbert, 8th Earl of Pembroke.

On 22 May 1702 the Board of Admiralty ceased control of naval affairs and was replaced by the Lord Admiral's Council. The previous office of Senior Naval Lord was replaced by a Senior Member to the Lords Admiral Council; he was usually a serving naval officer of admiral rank and was the Chief Naval Adviser to the Lord Admiral. This lasted until 8 November 1709, when the Board of Admiralty resumed control of Naval Affairs and the post of Senior Naval Lord was resumed.

On 2 February 1771 the office of Senior Naval Lord was renamed to First Naval Lord. The first post holder was Vice-admiral Augustus Hervey; he first served under First Lord of the Admiralty John Montagu, 4th Earl of Sandwich. In 1805, for the first time, specific functions were assigned to each of the 'Naval' Lords, who were described as 'Professional' Lords, leaving to the 'Civil' Lords the routine business of signing documents. On 2 May 1827 the Board of Admiralty once again ceased control of Naval Affairs and was replaced, until 1828, by a Lord High Admirals Council.

The title of the First Naval Lord was changed to First Sea Lord on the appointment of Sir Jackie Fisher in 1904. In 1917 the First Sea Lord was re-styled First Sea Lord and Chief of the Naval Staff. From 1923 onward, the First Sea Lord was a member of the Chiefs of Staff Committee, and from 1923 to 1959, in rotation with the representatives of the other services (the Chief of the Imperial General Staff and Chief of the Air Staff), he served as the chairman of that committee and head of all British armed forces. (Note: In 1955, it was decided to create a new post, Chief of the Defence Staff, who would be chairman of the Chiefs of Staff Committee.) The title was retained when the Board of Admiralty was abolished in 1964 and the Board's functions were integrated into the Ministry of Defence.

Under the current organisation, the First Sea Lord sits on the Defence Council, the Admiralty Board and the Navy Board.

Since 2012, the flagship of the First Sea Lord has nominally been the ship of the line HMS Victory, which used to be Lord Nelson's flagship.

Professional heads of the English/British Armed Forces
	Royal Navy	British Army	Royal Air Force	Combined
1645	N/A	Commander-in-Chief of the Forces (1645/60–1904, intermittently)	Not established	
1689	Senior Naval Lord (1689–1771)	Commander-in-Chief of the Forces (1645/60–1904, intermittently)	Not established	
1771	First Naval Lord (1771–1904)	Commander-in-Chief of the Forces (1645/60–1904, intermittently)	Not established	
1904	First Sea Lord (1904–1917)	Chief of the General Staff (1904–1909)	Not established	Inter-service co-ordination was carried out from 1904 by the Committee of Imperial Defence under the chairmanship of the Prime Minister
1909	First Sea Lord (1904–1917)	Chief of the Imperial General Staff (1909–1964)	Not established	Inter-service co-ordination was carried out from 1904 by the Committee of Imperial Defence under the chairmanship of the Prime Minister
1917	First Sea Lord and Chief of the Naval Staff (1917–present)	Chief of the Imperial General Staff (1909–1964)	Not established	Inter-service co-ordination was carried out from 1904 by the Committee of Imperial Defence under the chairmanship of the Prime Minister
1918	First Sea Lord and Chief of the Naval Staff (1917–present)	Chief of the Imperial General Staff (1909–1964)	Chief of the Air Staff (1918–present)	Inter-service co-ordination was carried out from 1904 by the Committee of Imperial Defence under the chairmanship of the Prime Minister
1923	First Sea Lord and Chief of the Naval Staff (1917–present)	Chief of the Imperial General Staff (1909–1964)	Chief of the Air Staff (1918–present)	Chairman of the Chiefs of Staff Committee (1923–1959, held by one of the service heads until 1956)
1959	First Sea Lord and Chief of the Naval Staff (1917–present)	Chief of the Imperial General Staff (1909–1964)	Chief of the Air Staff (1918–present)	Chief of the Defence Staff (1959–present)
1964	First Sea Lord and Chief of the Naval Staff (1917–present)	Chief of the General Staff (1964–present)	Chief of the Air Staff (1918–present)	Chief of the Defence Staff (1959–present)

== Appointees ==
The following table lists all those who have held the post of First Sea Lord or its preceding positions. Ranks and honours are as at the completion of their tenure:

No.	Portrait	Name	Took office	Left office	Time in office	Ref.
Senior Naval Lords
1	Arthur Herbert	Admiral; Arthur Herbert (c. 1648–1716)	8 March 1689	20 January 1690	318 days	
2	Sir John Chicheley	Rear-admiral; Sir John Chicheley (c. 1640–1691)	20 January 1690	5 June 1690	136 days	
3	Edward Russell	Admiral of the Fleet; Edward Russell (1653–1727)	5 June 1690	23 January 1691	232 days	
4	Henry Priestman	Captain; Henry Priestman (c. 1647–1712)	23 January 1691	2 May 1694	3 years, 99 days	
(3)	Edward Russell, 1st Earl of Orford	Admiral of the Fleet; Edward Russell, 1st Earl of Orford (1653–1727)	2 May 1694	31 May 1699	5 years, 29 days	
5	Sir George Rooke	Admiral of the Fleet; Sir George Rooke (1650–1709)	31 May 1699	26 January 1702	2 years, 240 days	
6	Sir John Leake	Admiral of the Fleet; Sir John Leake (1656–1720)	8 November 1709	4 October 1710	330 days	
7	Sir George Byng	Admiral; Sir George Byng (1663–1733)	4 October 1710	30 September 1712	1 year, 362 days	
(6)	Sir John Leake	Admiral of the Fleet; Sir John Leake (1656–1720)	30 September 1712	14 October 1714	2 years, 14 days	
(7)	Sir George Byng	Admiral; Sir George Byng (1663–1733)	14 October 1714	16 April 1717	2 years, 184 days	
8	Matthew Aylmer	Admiral of the Fleet; Matthew Aylmer (c. 1650–1720)	16 April 1717	19 March 1718	337 days	
(7)	Sir George Byng	Admiral of the Fleet; Sir George Byng (1663–1733)	19 March 1718	30 September 1721	3 years, 195 days	
9	Sir John Jennings	Admiral; Sir John Jennings (1664–1743)	30 September 1721	1 June 1727	5 years, 244 days	
10	Sir John Norris	Admiral; Sir John Norris (c. 1670–1749)	1 June 1727	13 May 1730	2 years, 346 days	
11	Sir Charles Wager	Admiral; Sir Charles Wager (1666–1743)	13 May 1730	23 June 1733	3 years, 41 days	
12	Lord Archibald Hamilton	Captain; Lord Archibald Hamilton (1673–1754)	23 June 1733	13 March 1738	4 years, 263 days	
13	Lord Harry Powlett	Lord Harry Powlett (1691–1759)	13 March 1738	19 March 1742	4 years, 6 days	
(12)	Lord Archibald Hamilton	Captain; Lord Archibald Hamilton (1673–1754)	19 March 1742	25 March 1746	4 years, 6 days	
14	Lord Vere Beauclerk	Admiral; Lord Vere Beauclerk (1699–1781)	25 March 1746	18 November 1749	3 years, 238 days	
15	George Anson, 1st Baron Anson	Admiral; George Anson, 1st Baron Anson (1697–1762)	18 November 1749	22 June 1751	1 year, 216 days	
16	Sir William Rowley	Admiral of the Fleet; Sir William Rowley (c. 1690–1768)	22 June 1751	17 November 1756	5 years, 148 days	
17	Edward Boscawen	Vice-admiral; Edward Boscawen (1711–1761)	17 November 1756	6 April 1757	140 days	
(16)	Sir William Rowley	Admiral of the Fleet; Sir William Rowley (c. 1690–1768)	6 April 1757	2 July 1757	87 days	
(17)	Edward Boscawen	Admiral; Edward Boscawen (1711–1761)	2 July 1757	10 January 1761	3 years, 192 days	
18	John Forbes	Admiral; John Forbes (1714–1796)	19 March 1761	20 April 1763	2 years, 32 days	
19	Richard Howe, 1st Earl Howe	Captain; Richard Howe, 1st Earl Howe (1726–1799)	20 April 1763	31 July 1765	2 years, 102 days	
20	Sir Charles Saunders	Vice-Admiral; Sir Charles Saunders (c. 1715–1775)	31 July 1765	15 September 1766	1 year, 46 days	
21	Augustus Keppel	Rear-Admiral; Augustus Keppel (1725–1786)	15 September 1766	11 December 1766	87 days	
22	Sir Peircy Brett	Rear-Admiral; Sir Peircy Brett (1709–1781)	11 December 1766	28 February 1770	3 years, 79 days	
23	Francis Holburne	Admiral; Francis Holburne (1704–1771)	28 February 1770	2 February 1771	339 days	
First Naval Lords
24	Augustus Hervey	Captain; Augustus Hervey (1724–1779)	2 February 1771	12 April 1775	4 years, 69 days	
25	Sir Hugh Palliser	Vice-Admiral; Sir Hugh Palliser (1723–1796)	12 April 1775	23 September 1779	4 years, 164 days	
26	Robert Man	Vice-Admiral; Robert Man (1721–1783)	23 September 1779	22 September 1780	365 days	
27	George Darby	Vice-Admiral; George Darby (c. 1720–1790)	22 September 1780	1 April 1782	1 year, 191 days	
28	Sir Robert Harland	Admiral; Sir Robert Harland (c. 1715–1784)	1 April 1782	30 January 1783	304 days	
29	Hugh Pigot	Admiral; Hugh Pigot (1722–1792)	30 January 1783	31 December 1783	335 days	
30	John Leveson-Gower	Rear-Admiral; John Leveson-Gower (1740–1792)	31 December 1783	12 August 1789	5 years, 224 days	
31	Samuel Hood, 1st Baron Hood	Admiral; Samuel Hood, 1st Baron Hood (1724–1816)	12 August 1789	7 March 1795	5 years, 207 days	
32	Sir Charles Middleton	Vice-Admiral; Sir Charles Middleton (1726–1813)	7 March 1795	20 November 1795	258 days	
33	James Gambier	Vice-Admiral; James Gambier (1756–1833)	20 November 1795	19 February 1801	5 years, 91 days	
34	Sir Thomas Troubridge	Rear-Admiral; Sir Thomas Troubridge (c. 1758–1807)	19 February 1801	15 May 1804	3 years, 86 days	
(33)	James Gambier	Vice Admiral; James Gambier (1756–1833)	15 May 1804	10 February 1806	1 year, 271 days	
35	John Markham	Rear Admiral; John Markham (1761–1827)	10 February 1806	6 April 1807	1 year, 55 days	
(33)	James Gambier	Admiral; James Gambier (1756–1833)	6 April 1807	9 May 1808	1 year, 33 days	
36	Sir Richard Bickerton	Vice Admiral; Sir Richard Bickerton (1759–1832)	9 May 1808	25 March 1812	3 years, 321 days	
37	William Domett	Vice Admiral; William Domett (1752–1828)	25 March 1812	23 October 1813	1 year, 212 days	
38	Sir Joseph Yorke	Vice Admiral; Sir Joseph Yorke (1768–1831)	23 October 1813	24 May 1816	2 years, 214 days	
39	Sir Graham Moore	Vice Admiral; Sir Graham Moore (1764–1843)	24 May 1816	13 March 1820	3 years, 294 days	
40	Sir William Johnstone Hope	Vice Admiral; Sir William Johnstone Hope (1766–1831)	13 March 1820	2 May 1827	7 years, 50 days	
41	Sir George Cockburn	Vice Admiral; Sir George Cockburn (1772–1853)	19 September 1828	25 November 1830	2 years, 67 days	
42	Sir Thomas Hardy	Rear Admiral; Sir Thomas Hardy (1769–1839)	25 November 1830	1 August 1834	3 years, 249 days	
43	Sir George Dundas	Rear Admiral; Sir George Dundas (1778–1834)	1 August 1834	7 October 1834	67 days	
44	Sir Charles Adam	Rear Admiral; Sir Charles Adam (1780–1853)	1 November 1834	23 December 1834	52 days	
(41)	Sir George Cockburn	Vice Admiral; Sir George Cockburn (1772–1853)	23 December 1834	25 April 1835	123 days	
(44)	Sir Charles Adam	Vice Admiral; Sir Charles Adam (1780–1853)	25 April 1835	8 September 1841	6 years, 197 days	
(41)	Sir George Cockburn	Admiral; Sir George Cockburn (1772–1853)	8 September 1841	13 July 1846	4 years, 308 days	
45	Sir William Parker	Vice Admiral; Sir William Parker (1781–1866)	13 July 1846	24 July 1846	11 days	
(44)	Sir Charles Adam	Vice Admiral; Sir Charles Adam (1780–1853)	24 July 1846	20 July 1847	361 days	
46	Sir James Dundas	Rear Admiral; Sir James Dundas (1785–1862)	20 July 1847	13 February 1852	4 years, 208 days	
47	Maurice Fitzhardinge Berkeley	Rear Admiral; Maurice Fitzhardinge Berkeley (1788–1867)	13 February 1852	2 March 1852	18 days	
48	Hyde Parker	Vice Admiral; Hyde Parker (1784–1854)	2 March 1852	26 May 1854	2 years, 85 days	
(47)	Maurice Fitzhardinge Berkeley	Vice Admiral; Maurice Fitzhardinge Berkeley (1788–1867)	26 May 1854	24 November 1857	2 years, 182 days	
48	Sir Richard Saunders Dundas	Vice Admiral; Sir Richard Saunders Dundas (1802–1861)	24 November 1857	8 March 1858	104 days	
49	Sir William Martin	Vice Admiral; Sir William Martin (1801–1895)	8 March 1858	28 June 1859	1 year, 112 days	
(48)	Richard Saunders Dundas	Vice Admiral; Richard Saunders Dundas (1802–1861)	28 June 1859	3 June 1861	1 year, 340 days	
50	Sir Frederick Grey	Admiral; Sir Frederick Grey (1805–1878)	15 June 1861	13 July 1866	5 years, 28 days	
51	Sir Alexander Milne	Vice Admiral; Sir Alexander Milne (1806–1896)	13 July 1866	18 December 1868	2 years, 158 days	
52	Sir Sydney Dacres	Admiral; Sir Sydney Dacres (1804–1884)	18 December 1868	27 November 1872	3 years, 345 days	
(51)	Sir Alexander Milne	Admiral; Sir Alexander Milne (1806–1896)	27 November 1872	7 September 1876	3 years, 285 days	
53	Sir Hastings Yelverton	Admiral; Sir Hastings Yelverton (1808–1878)	7 September 1876	5 November 1877	1 year, 59 days	
54	Sir George Wellesley	Admiral; Sir George Wellesley (1814–1901)	5 November 1877	12 August 1879	1 year, 280 days	
55	Sir Astley Cooper Key	Admiral; Sir Astley Cooper Key (1821–1888)	12 August 1879	1 July 1885	5 years, 323 days	
56	Sir Arthur Hood	Admiral; Sir Arthur Hood (1824–1901)	1 July 1885	15 February 1886	229 days	
57	Lord John Hay	Admiral; Lord John Hay (1827–1916)	15 February 1886	9 August 1886	175 days	
(56)	Sir Arthur Hood	Admiral; Sir Arthur Hood (1824–1901)	9 August 1886	24 October 1889	3 years, 76 days	
58	Sir Richard Hamilton	Admiral; Sir Richard Hamilton (1829–1912)	24 October 1889	28 September 1891	1 year, 339 days	
59	Sir Anthony Hoskins	Admiral; Sir Anthony Hoskins (1828–1901)	28 September 1891	1 November 1893	2 years, 34 days	
60	Sir Frederick Richards	Admiral of the Fleet; Sir Frederick Richards (1833–1912)	1 November 1893	19 August 1899	5 years, 291 days	
61	Lord Walter Kerr	Admiral of the Fleet; Lord Walter Kerr (1839–1927)	19 August 1899	21 October 1904	5 years, 63 days	
First Sea Lords
62	Sir John Fisher	Admiral of the Fleet; Sir John Fisher (1841–1920)	21 October 1904	25 January 1910	5 years, 96 days	
63	Sir Arthur Wilson	Admiral of the Fleet; Sir Arthur Wilson (1842–1921)	25 January 1910	5 December 1911	1 year, 314 days	
64	Sir Francis Bridgeman	Admiral; Sir Francis Bridgeman (1848–1929)	5 December 1911	9 December 1912	1 year, 4 days	
65	Prince Louis of Battenberg	Admiral; Prince Louis of Battenberg (1854–1921)	9 December 1912	30 October 1914	1 year, 325 days	
(62)	John Fisher, 1st Baron Fisher	Admiral of the Fleet; John Fisher, 1st Baron Fisher (1841–1920)	30 October 1914	15 May 1915	197 days	
66	Sir Henry Jackson	Admiral; Sir Henry Jackson (1855–1929)	15 May 1915	30 November 1916	1 year, 199 days	
67	Sir John Jellicoe	Admiral of the Fleet; Sir John Jellicoe (1859–1935)	30 November 1916	10 January 1918	1 year, 41 days	
68	Sir Rosslyn Wemyss	Admiral of the Fleet; Sir Rosslyn Wemyss (1864–1933)	10 January 1918	1 November 1919	1 year, 295 days	
69	David Beatty, 1st Earl Beatty	Admiral of the Fleet; David Beatty, 1st Earl Beatty (1871–1936)	1 November 1919	30 July 1927	7 years, 271 days	
70	Sir Charles Madden	Admiral of the Fleet; Sir Charles Madden (1862–1935)	30 July 1927	30 July 1930	3 years, 0 days	
71	Sir Frederick Field	Admiral of the Fleet; Sir Frederick Field (1871–1945)	30 July 1930	21 January 1933	2 years, 175 days	
72	Ernle Chatfield, 1st Baron Chatfield	Admiral of the Fleet; Ernle Chatfield, 1st Baron Chatfield (1873–1967)	21 January 1933	7 September 1938	5 years, 229 days	
73	Sir Roger Backhouse	Admiral of the Fleet; Sir Roger Backhouse (1878–1939)	7 September 1938	12 June 1939	278 days	
74	Sir Dudley Pound	Admiral of the Fleet; Sir Dudley Pound (1877–1943)	12 June 1939	15 October 1943	4 years, 125 days	
75	Andrew Cunningham, 1st Viscount Cunningham of Hyndhope	Admiral of the Fleet; Andrew Cunningham, 1st Viscount Cunningham of Hyndhope (1883–1963)	15 October 1943	24 May 1946	2 years, 221 days	
76	Sir John Cunningham	Admiral of the Fleet; Sir John Cunningham (1885–1962)	24 May 1946	29 September 1948	2 years, 128 days	
77	Bruce Fraser, 1st Baron Fraser of North Cape	Admiral of the Fleet; Bruce Fraser, 1st Baron Fraser of North Cape (1888–1981)	29 September 1948	20 December 1951	3 years, 82 days	
78	Sir Rhoderick McGrigor	Admiral of the Fleet; Sir Rhoderick McGrigor (1893–1959)	20 December 1951	18 April 1955	3 years, 119 days	
79	Louis Mountbatten, 1st Earl Mountbatten of Burma	Admiral of the Fleet; Louis Mountbatten, 1st Earl Mountbatten of Burma (1900–1979) (Note: Later served as Chief of the Defence Staff.)	18 April 1955	19 October 1959	4 years, 184 days	
80	Sir Charles Lambe	Admiral; Sir Charles Lambe (1900–1960)	19 October 1959	23 May 1960	217 days	
81	Sir Caspar John	Admiral of the Fleet; Sir Caspar John (1903–1984)	23 May 1960	7 August 1963	3 years, 76 days	
82	Sir David Luce	Admiral; Sir David Luce (1906–1971)	7 August 1963	15 March 1966	2 years, 220 days	
83	Sir Varyl Begg	Admiral; Sir Varyl Begg (1908–1995)	15 March 1966	12 August 1968	2 years, 150 days	
84	Sir Michael Le Fanu	Admiral; Sir Michael Le Fanu (1913–1970)	12 August 1968	3 July 1970	1 year, 325 days	
85	Sir Peter Hill-Norton	Admiral; Sir Peter Hill-Norton (1915–2004)	3 July 1970	9 April 1971	280 days	
86	Sir Michael Pollock	Admiral; Sir Michael Pollock (1916–2006)	9 April 1971	1 March 1974	2 years, 326 days	
87	Sir Edward Ashmore	Admiral; Sir Edward Ashmore (1919–2016)	1 March 1974	9 February 1977	2 years, 345 days	
88	Sir Terence Lewin	Admiral of the Fleet; Sir Terence Lewin (1920–1999)	1 March 1977	6 July 1979	2 years, 127 days	
89	Sir Henry Leach	Admiral; Sir Henry Leach (1923–2011)	6 July 1979	1 December 1982	3 years, 148 days	
90	Sir John Fieldhouse	Admiral; Sir John Fieldhouse (1928–1992)	1 December 1982	2 August 1985	2 years, 244 days	
91	Sir William Staveley	Admiral; Sir William Staveley (1928–1997)	2 August 1985	25 May 1989	3 years, 296 days	
92	Sir Julian Oswald	Admiral; Sir Julian Oswald (1933–2011)	25 May 1989	2 March 1993	3 years, 281 days	
93	Sir Benjamin Bathurst	Admiral; Sir Benjamin Bathurst (1936–2025)	2 March 1993	10 July 1995	2 years, 130 days	
94	Sir Jock Slater	Admiral; Sir Jock Slater (born 1938)	10 July 1995	8 October 1998	3 years, 90 days	
95	Sir Michael Boyce	Admiral; Sir Michael Boyce (1943–2022)	8 October 1998	16 January 2001	2 years, 100 days	
96	Sir Nigel Essenhigh	Admiral; Sir Nigel Essenhigh (born 1944)	16 January 2001	17 September 2002	1 year, 244 days	
97	Sir Alan West	Admiral; Sir Alan West (born 1948)	17 September 2002	6 February 2006	3 years, 142 days	
98	Sir Jonathon Band	Admiral; Sir Jonathon Band (born 1950)	6 February 2006	21 July 2009	3 years, 165 days	
99	Sir Mark Stanhope	Admiral; Sir Mark Stanhope (born 1952)	21 July 2009	9 April 2013	3 years, 262 days	
100	Sir George Zambellas	Admiral; Sir George Zambellas (born 1958)	9 April 2013	8 April 2016	2 years, 365 days	
101	Sir Philip Jones	Admiral; Sir Philip Jones (born 1960)	8 April 2016	19 June 2019	3 years, 72 days	
102	Sir Tony Radakin	Admiral; Sir Tony Radakin (born 1965)	19 June 2019	8 November 2021	2 years, 142 days	
103	Sir Ben Key	Admiral; Sir Ben Key (born 1965)	8 November 2021	6 May 2025	3 years, 179 days	
-	Sir Martin Connell	Vice Admiral; Sir Martin Connell (born 1968); Acting	7 May 2025	27 May 2025	20 days	
104	Sir Gwyn Jenkins	General; Sir Gwyn Jenkins	27 May 2025	Incumbent	1 year, 157 days	

== In fiction ==
In John Buchan's novel The Thirty-Nine Steps (1915), the First Sea Lord is named as Lord Alloa, an impostor whom Richard Hannay recognizes at a meeting as a spy and recent pursuer of his. Hannay describes Lord Alloa as recognizable from news pictures for his "beard cut like a spade, the firm fighting mouth, the blunt square nose, and the keen blue eyes...the man, they say, that made the New British Navy". The real First Sea Lord at the time the story is set (early summer 1914) was Prince Louis of Battenberg, coincidentally also bearded.

== See also ==
- Chief of the Defence Staff (United Kingdom)
- Second Sea Lord
- Third Sea Lord
- Fourth Sea Lord
- Fifth Sea Lord
- Chief of the Air Staff – the Royal Air Force equivalent
- Chief of the General Staff – the British Army equivalent

== Sources ==
- Buchan, John (1999) [1915]. The Thirty-nine Steps. Oxford University Press. ISBN 978-0-19-283931-2.
- Friedman, N. (2015). The British Battleship 1906-1946. Seaforth. ISBN 9781848322257.
- Heathcote, Tony (2002). The British Admirals of the Fleet 1734–1995. Pen & Sword Ltd. ISBN 0-85052-835-6.
- Kerr, Mark (1934). Prince Louis of Battenberg: Admiral of the Fleet. London: Longmans, Green and Co.
- Mackay, Ruddock F. (1973). Fisher of Kilverstone. London: Oxford University Press. ISBN 978-0198224099.
- Rodger, N.A.M. (1979). The Admiralty. Offices of State. Lavenham: T. Dalton Ltd. ISBN 0900963948.
- Sainty, J.C., ed. (1975). Lord High Admiral and Commissioners of the Admiralty 1660-1870, Office-Holders in Modern Britain. Vol. 4: Admiralty Officials 1660-1870. Archived from the original on 7 October 2014.
- Thomas, David A (1988). A companion to the Royal Navy. Harrap. ISBN 0-245-54572-7.
