= HMS Eagle (1745) =

Ship of the line of the Royal Navy

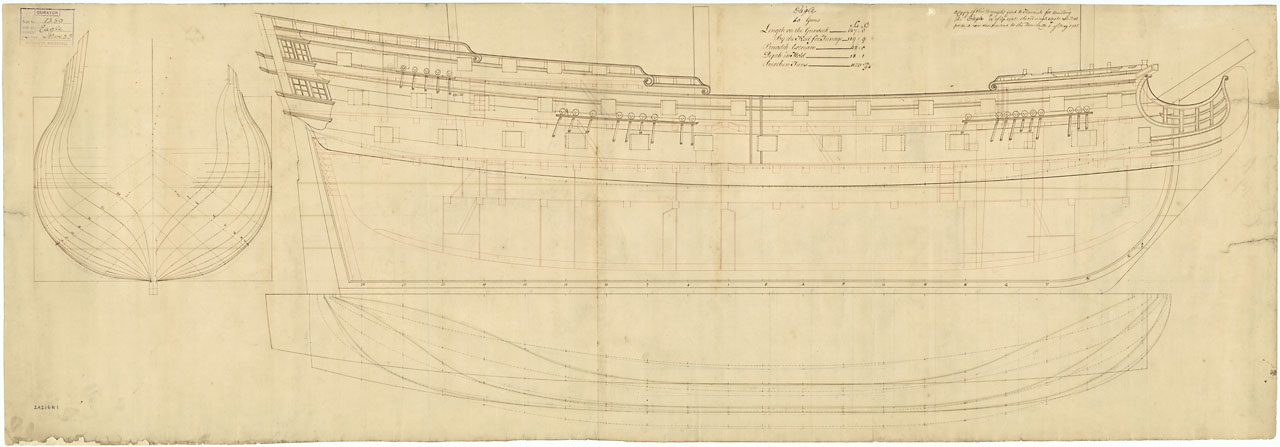
- Eagle

History

Great Britain
- Name: HMS Eagle
- Ordered: 10 April 1744
- Builder: John Barnard, Harwich
- Launched: 2 December 1745
- Honours and awards: Second battle of Cape Finisterre, 1747
- Fate: Sold, 1767

General characteristics
- Class & type: Fourth rate ship of the line
- Length: 147 ft (44.8 m) (gundeck)
- Beam: 42 ft (12.8 m)
- Depth of hold: 18 ft 1 in (5.5 m)
- Propulsion: Sails
- Sail plan: Full-rigged ship
- Armament: 58 guns: Gundeck: 24 × 24 pdrs; Upper gundeck: 24 × 12 pdrs; Quarterdeck: 8 × 6 pdrs; Forecastle: 2 × 6 pdrs

HMS Eagle was a 58-gun fourth rate ship of the line of the Royal Navy built at King's Yard in Harwich by John Barnard and launched in 1745.

== Construction ==
The contract for construction was issued on 10 April 1744 for a vessel named Centurion, a fourth-rate ship of the line to be built according to dimensions laid down in the 1741 proposals of the 1719 Establishment. Her keel was laid on 24 July 1744, and on 15 November she was renamed Eagle to make way for the recommissioning of her namesake, Admiral Anson's flagship, which was returned to active service.

As built, Eagle had an overall length of 147 ft 0 in (44.8 m) with a gundeck of 119 ft 9 in (36.5 m). Her beam was 42 ft 1.5 in (12.8 m) with a hold depth of 18 ft 2 in (5.5 m). She measured 1130 29/94 tons burthen. Construction costs were £14,767 exclusive of armament and rigging. Her designated crew was 420 men.

She was originally designed to carry 56 guns with an upper and lower gun deck each carrying 24 24-pounder cannons, eight 6-pounder cannons on her quarterdeck and two additional 6-pounders mounted on the forecastle. Two more 24-pounder cannons were added to the upper deck prior to launch in 1745.

== Naval service ==
Eagle was launched on 2 December 1745. She was under the command of George Rodney between 1747 and 1748 during the War of the Austrian Succession. Eagle is also notable as being the ship in which James Cook began his career in the Royal Navy, serving from 1755 to 1757 as able seaman, master's mate and finally boatswain under Captain Joseph Hamar for his first year aboard, and Captain Hugh Palliser thereafter.

Eagle was sold out of Navy service in 1767.

== Bibliography ==
- Beaglehole, J.C., ed. (1968). The Journals of Captain James Cook on His Voyages of Discovery, vol. I:The Voyage of the Endeavour 1768–1771. Cambridge University Press. OCLC 223185477.
- Lavery, Brian (1983) The Ship of the Line - Volume 1: The development of the battlefleet 1650-1850. Conway Maritime Press. ISBN 0-85177-252-8.
- Winfield, Rif (2007). British Warships of the Age of Sail 1714–1792: Design, Construction, Careers and Fates. Seaforth. ISBN 9781844157006.
