= HDMS Thetis (1790) =

Royal Dano-Norwegian Navy frigate

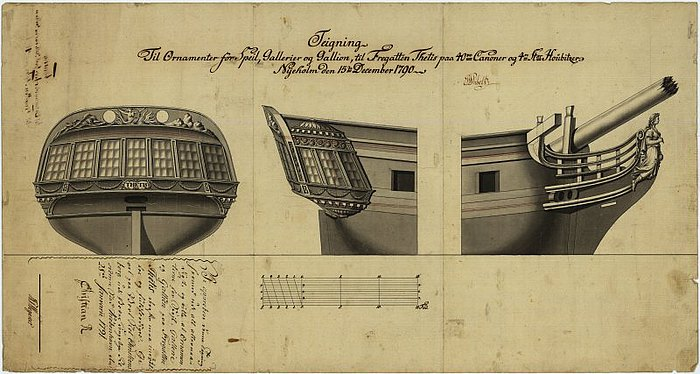
- Construction drawing by Stibolt.

History

Denmark
- Name: Thetis
- Owner: Royal Danish Navy
- Builder: Royal Danish Naval Dockyard
- Launched: 7 August 1790
- Commissioned: 1790
- Fate: Sold in auction

General characteristics
- Class & type: Frigate
- Tons burthen: 658
- Length: gun deck 46.4 m
- Beam: 11.76 m
- Draught: 5.17 meters aft
- Armament: 26 Danish 18-Pounder, 4 Danish 12-Pound Howitzer, 14 Danish 6-Pounder, 6 Danish 1-Pounder

HDMS Thetis was a Fifth rate frigate of the Royal Dano-Norwegian Navy, which she served from 1790 to 1850. She is remembered as the ship that carried a young Bertel Thorvaldsen to Malta in 1796. The sculptor ended up living and working in Rome the next more than forty years. He created a large number of small portrait drawings of the officers on board the ship.

== Construction and design ==
Thetis was built at Nyholm to a design by Ernst Wilhelm Stibolt. She was laid down on 19 August 1789 and the construction was completed on 19 May 1792. She was launched on 7 August 1790.

Thetis was 46.45 metres (152 ft 5 in) long, with a beam of 11.76 metres (38 ft 7 in) and a draught of 5.17 metres (17 ft 0 in).She displaced 658 1/2 læster. Her complement was approximately 380 men. Her armament was 26 × 18-pounder guns, 14 6-pounder guns, 4 × 12-pounder howitzers and 6 × one-pounder falconettes.

== Career ==
Thetis was sent on a diplomatic mission to the Mediterranean in 1796–97. She was under command of captain Lorentz Fisker and with Captain lieutenant Claus Hvidtfeldt Blom as second-in-command. Fisker had two missions: first, to escort the annual "gift ship" to Algiers, and second, to arrange for the freeing of two Danish vessels and their crews in Tripoli. The other officers were Gerhard Sievers Bille (first lieutenant), Laurits Jensen Grove (first lieutenant), Johannes Krieger (1773–1818, second lieutenant), Andreas Christian Lütken (second lieutenant), Johan Joachim Uldall (second lieutenant), Johan Christian Gustav Hohlenberg (second lieutenant), Peder Pavels (chaplin), Christian Georg Hansen (chief surgeon), Blankfordt (junior surgeon), G. Rørbye (Skibsproviantforvalter), Hassing (død 28.4.1797, Underproviantskriver), H. A. Schmidt (Skibssekretær), Hans Jørgen Tronsen)chief mate) and Gregorius (hovmester).

The sculptor Bertel Thorvaldsen was granted permission to travel to Rome with the ship. He visited Fisker and his wife in their home on Toldbodvej several times prior to the ship's departure. He boarded the ship on 29 August 1796.

Thetis set sail from Copenhagen on 30 August, On 6–8 September, she fired warning shots at several Royal Navy ships in the North Sea. On 9 September, she anchored off Dover due to heavy fog. On 2 October, she exchanged gun shots with several Portuguese Navy vessels off the coast of Portugal. On 8 October, Thetis anchored at the Roads of Málaga. Her departure from Málaga was delayed by lack of wind. Thorvaldsen and some of the officers spent the time touring the town, visiting some of its churches and coffee houses. Thetis departed from Málaga on 11 October, bound for Algiers. On 16 October, she left the tribute ship Laurentius behind in Algiers, continuing alone to Malta.

At Valetta, on 24 October, Thetis was placed under a 40-day plague quarantine. On 3 November, Malta's health commission decided to maintain the 40-day quarantine plus an extra 20 days in case the ship decided to call at Tripoli in the meantime.

On 7 November, Thetis continued to Tripoli. On 14 November, Fisker engaged in diplomatic, but unsuccessful, negotiations with the old Pasha of Tripoli, Yusuf Karamanli. A storm forecast forced Thetis to exit the Port of Tripoli, leaving behind her captain. On 23 November, she was finally able to return to Tripoli.

Thetis left Tripoli again on 25 November, bound either for Sicily or Malta. On her arrival at Valetta, on 2 December, she was placed under plague quarantine until 18 December. On 17 January 1797, Thetis departed from Valetta.

== Legacy ==
Thorvaldsen created a number of miniature portrait drawings of the officers on board the Thetis en route to the Mediterranean in 1796.

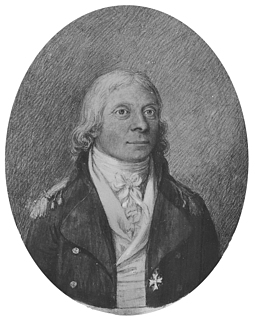
Lorentz Fisker

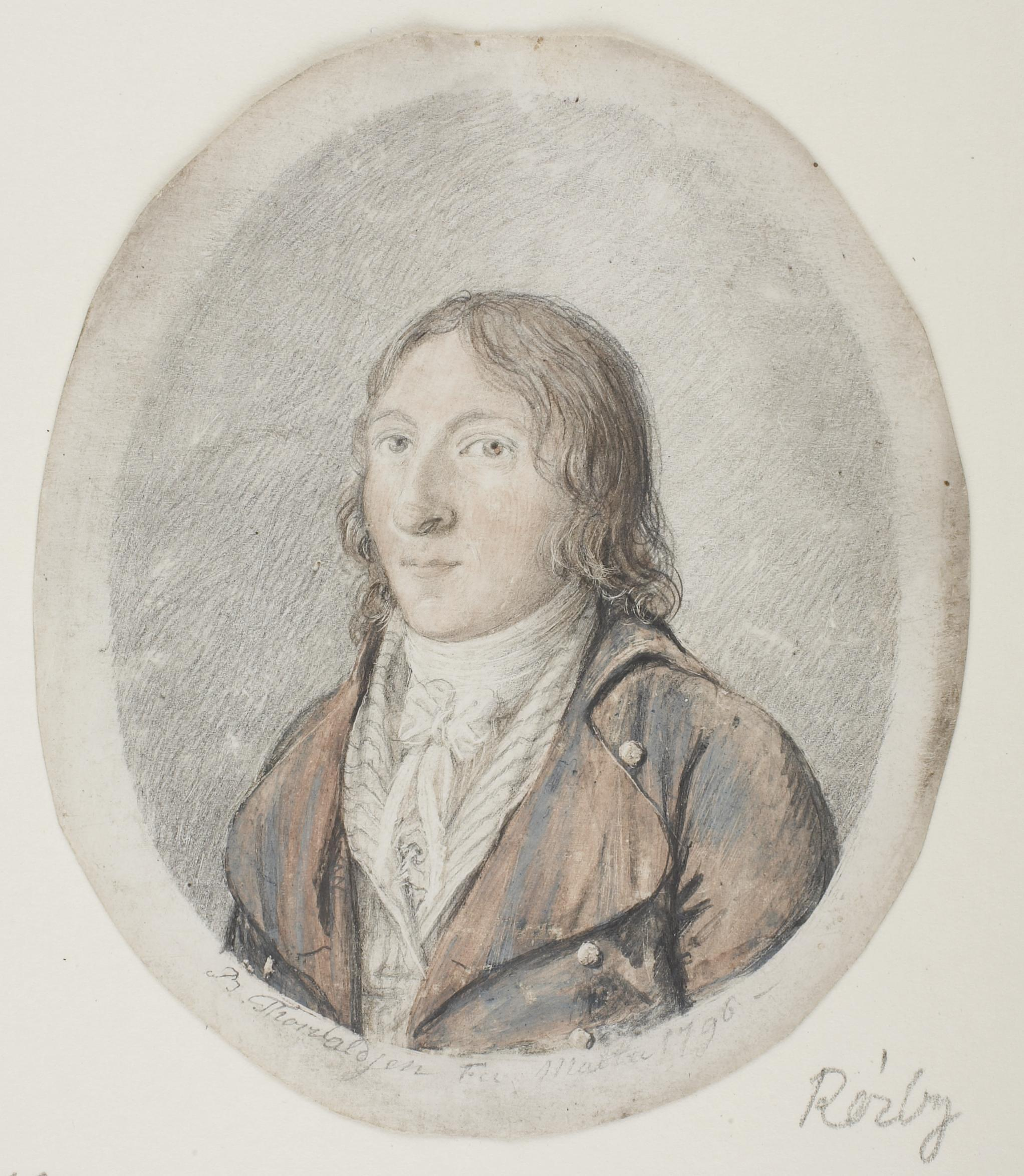
G.F. Rørbye
