= George Cockburne =

Captain George Cockburne
- Died: 20 July 1770; Brighton
- Military career
- Allegiance: Kingdom of Great Britain
- Branch: Royal Navy
- Service years: c.1741–1770
- Rank: Captain
- Commands: HMS Drake; HMS Gibraltar; HMS Medway; HMS Glory; HMS Yarmouth; HMS Nassau; Comptroller of the Navy
- Conflicts: War of the Austrian Succession; Seven Years' War

Captain George Cockburne (died 20 July 1770) was a naval administrator, who went on to be Comptroller of the Navy.

== Career ==
Cockburne was appointed Comptroller of the Navy and promoted to captain in 1756. In 1770, while still comptroller, he stood unsuccessfully in the Scarborough by-election with support from the Marquess of Granby.

== Family ==
He married Caroline, 8th Lady Forrester of Corstorphine. Their only child was Anna Maria Cockburne (d.1808), 9th Lady Forrester of Corstorphine.

Military offices
Preceded by Digby Dent	Comptroller of the Navy; 1756–1770	Succeeded by Sir Hugh Palliser
