= Robert Man =

Royal Navy Admiral (1721–1783)

Admiral Robert Man
- Born: 1721
- Died: 1783 (aged 61–62)
- Military career
- Allegiance: Kingdom of Great Britain
- Branch: Royal Navy
- Service years: 1731–1783
- Rank: Admiral
- Commands: HMS Launceston; HMS Lynn; HMS Anson; HMS Prince Frederick; HMS Lancaster; HMS Cornwall; Leeward Islands Station; Mediterranean Fleet; Lord Commissioner of the Admiralty
- Conflicts: War of the Austrian Succession; Seven Years' War; Siege of Louisbourg; American Revolutionary War

Admiral Robert Man (1721–1783) was a Royal Navy officer. He commanded the third-rate HMS Lancaster at the siege of Louisbourg in June 1758 during the French and Indian War. He went on to become commander-in-chief of the Leeward Islands Station, then Commander-in-Chief, Mediterranean Fleet and finally First Naval Lord.

== Naval career ==
Robert Man was born in 1721 and baptised at St Mary's, Chatham on 2 July of that year. He is listed in three ships commanded by his father, Captain Robert Man (1675-1745), these being a mixture of the usual fiction and fact. His passing certificate is dated 12 March 1739. Man officially joined the Royal Navy on 17 September 1740. Promoted to post-captain on 22 June 1745, he took command of the fifth-rate HMS Launceston in June 1745, the fifth-rate HMS Lynn in June 1746 and the fourth-rate HMS Anson in February 1755. He went on to command the third-rate HMS Prince Frederick in 1758 and the third-rate HMS Lancaster later that year. He commanded Lancaster at the siege of Louisbourg in June 1758 during the French and Indian War. He then transferred to the command of the third-rate HMS Cornwall in 1760.

Whilst in command of Cornwall, he took on board the orphaned son of his cousin, another Captain Robert Man (1720-1762), and did much to promote his career. The boy, later Admiral Robert Man (1745-1813), was described by Nelson as 'a good man in every sense of the word'.

Man became commander-in-chief of the Leeward Islands Station in 1769 and established a naval hospital at Antigua.

Promoted to rear admiral on 18 October 1770, Man went on to be commander-in-chief of the Mediterranean Fleet in 1774 and, having been promoted to vice admiral on 31 March 1775, he joined the Board of Admiralty as First Naval Lord in the North ministry in April 1779. He retired from the Admiralty Board in September 1780 and, having been promoted to full admiral on 26 September 1780, died in 1783.

== Sources ==
- Rodger, N.A.M. (1979). The Admiralty. Offices of State. Lavenham: T. Dalton Ltd. ISBN 0900963948.

Military offices
Preceded by Thomas Pye	Commander-in-Chief, Leeward Islands Station; 1769–1772	Succeeded by William Parry
Preceded by Lord Howe	Commander-in-Chief, Mediterranean Fleet; 1774–1778	Succeeded by Robert Duff
Preceded by Sir Hugh Palliser	First Naval Lord; 1779–1780	Succeeded by George Darby
