= HMS Shrewsbury (1758) =

Ship of the line of the Royal Navy

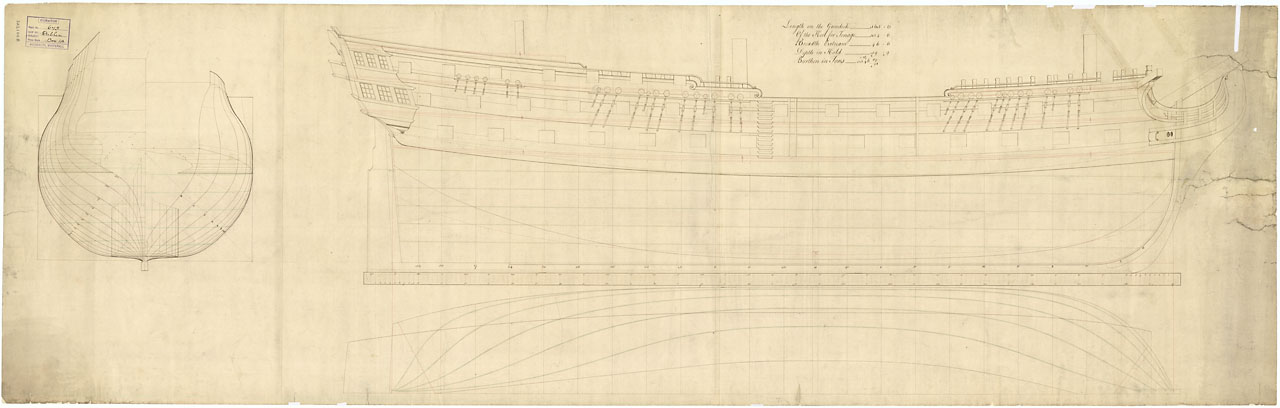
- Shrewsbury

History

Great Britain
- Name: HMS Shrewsbury
- Ordered: 31 October 1755
- Builder: Wells & Company, Deptford Dockyard
- Laid down: 14 January 1756
- Launched: 23 February 1758
- Commissioned: March 1758
- Fate: Scuttled off Jamaica, 1783

General characteristics
- Class & type: Dublin-class ship of the line
- Tons burthen: 1594 31/94 bm
- Length: 166 ft 1 in (50.62 m) (gundeck); 135 ft 2.5 in (41.212 m) (keel)
- Beam: 47 ft 1 in (14.35 m)
- Depth of hold: 19 ft 9 in (6.02 m)
- Propulsion: Sails
- Sail plan: Full-rigged ship
- Complement: 550
- Armament: 74 guns: Gundeck: 28 × 32 pdrs; Upper gundeck: 28 × 18 pdrs; Quarterdeck: 14 × 9 pdrs; Forecastle: 4 × 9 pdrs

HMS Shrewsbury was a 74-gun third-rate ship of the line of the Royal Navy, launched on 23 February 1758 at Deptford Dockyard.

== Service history ==
=== 1758 ===
In March 1758 the newly commissioned Shrewsbury, captained by Hugh Palliser joined forces with the smaller warships HMS Unicorn and HMS Lizard off Brest where the French frigate Calypso was destroyed in Audierne Bay on 12 September.

=== 1759 ===
From February 1759 Shrewsbury was in the North American theatre, and was at the campaign against the French in Quebec which came to a conclusion on 13 September that year.

=== 1760 and 1761 ===
From the summer of 1760 Shrewsbury served in the Mediterranean Sea, forcing the French squadron from Toulon to seek protection in the Crete harbour of Candia. In 1761, whilst enforcing the blockade of French ports in the Mediterranean during the Seven Years' War, Shrewsbury, stopped, searched and detained the Danish ship Den Flyvende Engel which was at that time part of a convoy escorted by HDMS Grønland. (Note: In the same reference (at page 30-31) Andersen analyses the cynical use of a neutral Royal Danish Navy ship to escort private French cargoes masquerading as Danish to break the British blockade of French ports. The captain of HMS Shrewsbury saw through the scam, and negotiated the capture of Den Flyvende Engel without a shot being fired.)

=== 1762 ===
On 18 September 1762 HMS Shrewsbury, together with her squadron of Superb, Bedford and Minerva, arrived off St John's, Newfoundland just a few hours after the town had capitulated to Lord Colville's forces, the French naval squadron under Charles Ternay having escaped the British blockade in fog on 15 September.

== Fate ==
In 1783, she was condemned and scuttled.
