= HMS Captain (1678) =

Ship of the line of the Royal Navy

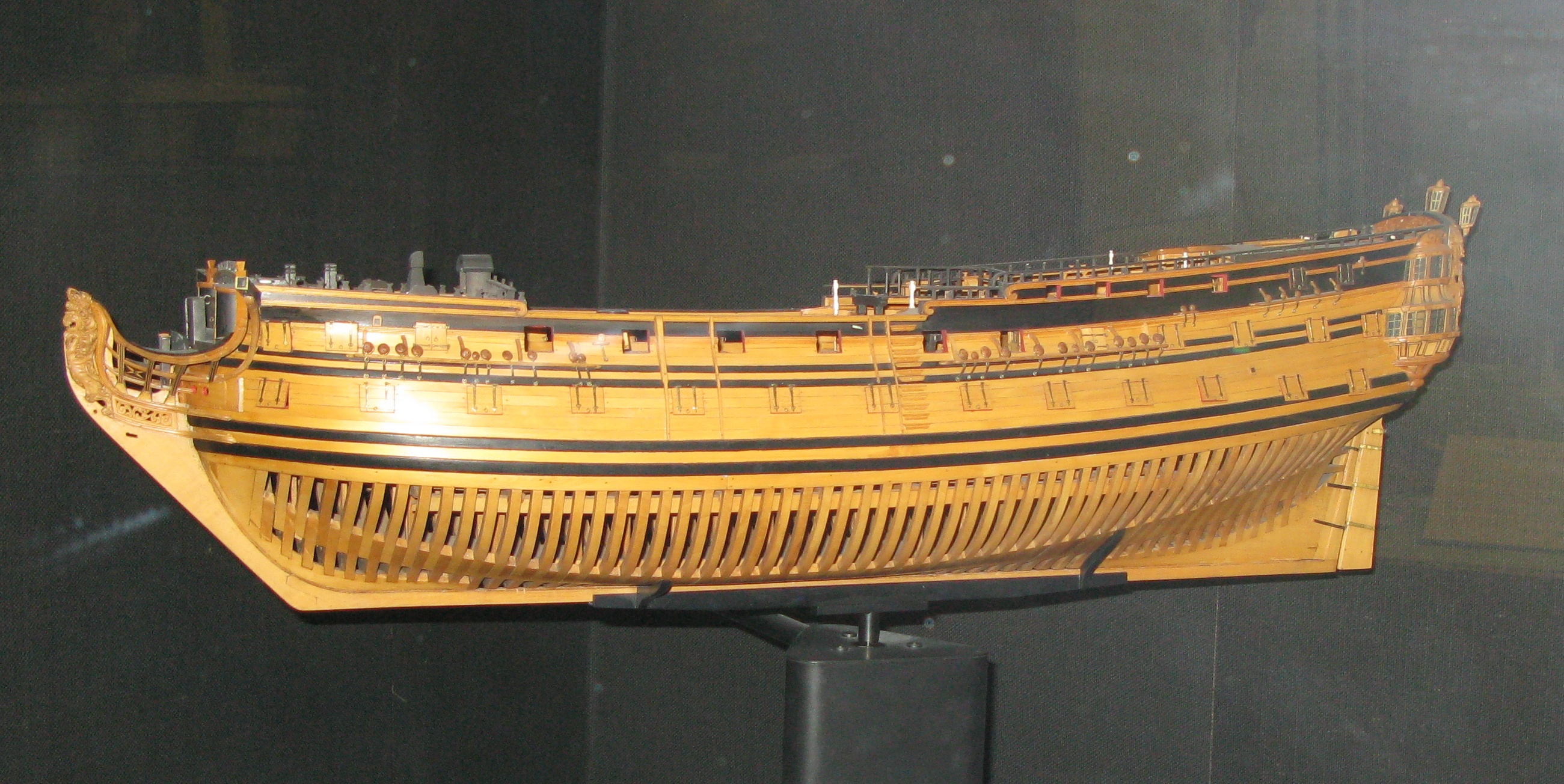
- A model of the hull of HMS Captain after her 1708 rebuild

History

Kingdom of England
- Name: HMS Captain
- Ordered: 9 June 1677
- Builder: Woolwich Dockyard
- Launched: 1678
- Commissioned: 12 September 1678
- Honours and awards: Barfleur 1692; Vigo 1704; Gibraltar 1704; Velez-Malaga 1704; Passero 1718
- Fate: Broken up, 1762

General characteristics as built
- Class & type: 70-gun third rate ship of the line
- Tons burthen: 1,04120/94 tons (bm)
- Length: 149 ft 6 in (45.57 m) gundeck; 119 ft 10 in (36.53 m) keel for tonnage
- Beam: 40 ft 5 in (12.32 m)
- Draught: 18 ft 0 in (5.49 m)
- Depth of hold: 17 ft 1 in (5.21 m)
- Propulsion: Sails
- Sail plan: Full-rigged ship
- Armament: 1677 Establishment 72/60 guns; 26 × demi-cannons 54 cwt – 9.5 ft (LD); 26 × 12-pdr guns 32 cwt – 9 ft (UD); 10 × sakers 16 cwt – 7 ft (QD); 4 × sakers 16 cwt – 7 ft (Fc); 5 × 5 3-pdr guns 5 cwt – 5 ft (RH)

General characteristics 1708 rebuild
- Class & type: 1706 Establishment 70-gun third rate ship of the line
- Tons burthen: 1,12151/94 tons (bm)
- Length: 150 ft 6 in (45.87 m) gundeck; 124 ft 2 in (37.85 m) keel for tonnage
- Beam: 41 ft 2.5 in (12.56 m)
- Depth of hold: 17 ft 4 in (5.28 m)
- Propulsion: Sails
- Sail plan: Full-rigged ship
- Armament: 1703 Establishment 70/62 guns; 24/22 × 24 pdr guns (LD); 26/24 × demi-culverins (UD); 12/10 × 6-pdr guns (QD); 4/2 × 6-pdr guns (Fc); 4 × 3-pdr guns (RH)

General characteristics 1722 rebuild
- Class & type: 1719 Establishment 70-gun third rate ship of the line
- Tons burthen: 1,13972/94 tons (bm)
- Length: 151 ft 0 in (46.02 m) (gundeck); 124 ft 2 in (37.85 m)
- Beam: 41 ft 6.5 in (12.66 m)
- Depth of hold: 17 ft 5.5 in (5.32 m)
- Propulsion: Sails
- Sail plan: Full-rigged ship
- Armament: 70 guns 1719 Establishment; 24 × 24-pdr guns (LD); 26 × 12-pdr guns (UD); 14 × 6-pdr guns (QD); 4 × 6-pdr guns (Fc)

HMS Captain was a 70-gun third rate built at Woolwich Dockyard in 1677/78. After sitting in Ordinary for ten years she was in active commission for the War of the English Succession fighting at Beachy Head and Barfleur. She was in Ordinary until 1706 when she was rebuilt. She was in active commission for the last half of the War of Spanish Succession but fought in no major engagements. She was at the Battle of Passero I 1718. She was rebuilt in 1720/22. She made two forays in to the Baltic though the bulk of her late career was spent as guardship at Portsmouth. She was hulked in 1740 and finally broken in 1762.

She was the first vessel to bear the name Captain in the English and Royal Navy.

HMS Captain was awarded the Battle Honour Barfleur 1692 and Passero 1718.

== Construction and specifications ==
She was ordered on 9 June 1677 to be built at Woolwich Dockyard under the guidance of Master Shipwright Phineas Pett (until February 1678) then completed by Thomas Shish. She was launched in 1678. Her dimensions were a gundeck of 149 feet 6 inches (45.57 metres) with a keel of 119 feet 10 inches (36.53 metres) for tonnage calculation with a breadth of 40 feet 5 inches (12.32 metres) and a depth of hold of 17 feet 1 inch (5.21 metres). Her builder's measure tonnage was calculated as 1,04120/94 tons (burthen). Her draught was 18 feet 0 inches (5.49 metres).

Her initial gun armament was in accordance with the 1677 Establishment with 70/62 guns consisting of twenty-six demi-cannons (54 cwt, 9.5 ft) on the lower deck, twenty-six 12-pounder guns (32 cwt, 9 ft) on the upper deck, ten sakers (16 cwt, 7 ft) on the quarterdeck and four sakers (16 cwt, 7 ft) on the foc's'le with four 3-pounder guns (5 cwt, 5 ft) on the poop deck or roundhouse. By 1688 she would carry seventy guns as per the 1685 Establishment. She carried seventy guns in 1696: twenty-two demi-cannons, four culverins, twenty-four 12-pounder guns, sixteen sakers, and four 3-pounder guns. Her initial manning establishment would be for a crew of 460/380/300 personnel.

== Commissioned service ==
=== Service 1679-1699 ===
She was commissioned on 12 September 1678 under the command of Captain Sir John Holmes for service in the English Channel until his death on 22 September 1679. In 1690 she was under the command of Captain Daniel Jones. She partook in the Battle of Beachy Head in Rear (Blue) Squadron on 30 June 1690. She fought in the Battle of Barfleur in Centre (Red) Squadron, Rear Division from 19 to 22 May 1692. In 1693 she was under Captain Francis Wyvell. She took part in Admiral John Lord Berkeley's operations (an attack on Brest, France) in June 1694. In 1695 she was under Captain Gabriel Hughes sailing with Peregrine, the Marquis de Carmarthen's Squadron. While cruising in the English Channel, mistook a fleet of homeward bound merchantmen as the French Fleet and retired to the Irish Channel. Several English merchant ships were taken by French privateers. In 1696 she sailed under the command of Captain Richard Lestock. She returned home to pay off in 1697. She was to be rebuilt in Portsmouth in 1706/08.

=== Rebuild at Portsmouth Dockyard 1706/08 ===
She was ordered rebuilt on 24 April 1706 at Portsmouth Dockyard under the guidance of Master Shipwright Thomas Podd. Her dimensions were a gundeck of 150 feet 6 inches (45.87 metres) with a keel of 124 feet 2 inches (37.85 metres) for tonnage calculation with a breadth of 41 feet 2 inches (12.55 metres) and a depth of hold of 17 feet 4 inches (5.28 metres). Her builder's measure tonnage was calculated as 1,12151/94 tons (burthen).

Her armament was under the 1703 Establishment as 70 guns wartime/62 guns peacetime consisting of twenty-four/twenty-two 24-pounder guns of 9.5 feet in length on the lower deck (LD), twenty-six/twenty-four demi-culverins of 9-foot length on the upper deck (UD), twelve/ten 6-pounder guns of 8.5-foot length on the quarterdeck (QD), and four/two 6-pounder guns of (2/2) 9-foot length and (2/0) of 7.5-foot length on the foc's'le (Fc), with four 5.5 foot 3-pounder guns on the poop deck or roundhouse (RH).

=== Service 1708-1720 ===
She was commissioned in 1708 under the command of Captain Richard Griffith for service Sir George Byng's Fleet. She sailed With Admiral Byng to the Tagus as an escort for the Queen of Portugal. She was detached to serve with Sir John Jenning's Squadron on the Portuguese coast in 1709. She was later assigned to Rear-Admiral Sir Edward Whittaker's Squadron in the Mediterranean, finally returning Home with Whittaker's Squadron In June 1710. Captain Thomas Smith commanded from 1710 until 1714 in the Mediterranean with Admiral Sir John Jenning. Following the end of the War of Spanish Succession, she returned home at the end of 1713. She underwent a large repair at Portsmouth at a cost of 3,664.11.11d (Note: A total cost accounting for inflation of approximately £723,700 in today's money) during 1714/15. She was then placed in Ordinary. During 1717/18 she underwent a small repair and was fitted for the Mediterranean at Portsmouth for 5,690.4.6 3/4d. (Note: A total cost accounting for inflation of approximately £1,125,200 in today's money) She was recommissioned in 1718 under Captain Archibald Hamilton for service in the Mediterranean with Sir George Byng's Fleet. The Fleet sailed from Spithead on 15 June 1718. She had been detached to Malta but rejoined during the action. She fought at the Battle of Passero on 11 August 1718 capturing the 70-gun Spanish ship Principe de Asturias (the former HMS Cumberland). She remained in the Mediterranean though 1719. She returned to Home Waters and was dismantled at Portsmouth for rebuilding.

=== Rebuild at Portsmouth Dockyard 1719-1723 ===
She was ordered on 18 November 1719 to be rebuilt to the 1719 Establishment at Portsmouth under the guidance of Master Shipwright John Naish. Her keel was laid on 27 July 1720 and launched on 21 May 1722. Her dimensions were a gundeck of 151 feet 0 inches (46.02 metres) with a keel of 124 feet 2 inches (37.85 metres) for tonnage calculation with a breadth of 41 feet 6.5 inches (12.66 metres) and a depth of hold of 17 feet 5.5 inches (5.32 metres). Her builder's measure tonnage was calculated as 1,13972/94 tons (burthen).

Her armament was under the 1719 Establishment as 70 guns consisting of twenty-six 24-pounder guns on the lower deck (LD), twenty-six 12-pounder guns on the upper deck (UD), fourteen 6-pounder guns on the quarterdeck (QD), and four 6-pounder guns on the foc's'le (Fc). Her crew would be 440 personnel.

=== Service 1721-1762 ===
She was commissioned under the command of Captain Philip Vanbrugh in 1721 as guardship at Portsmouth. In 1723, remaining as guardship until 1725, she was under the command of Captain Thomas Whorwood. In 1726 she was assigned to Vice-Admiral Sir Charles Wager's Fleet for service in the Baltic. The sailed from the Nore for Copenhagen, Denmark then on to Stockholm, Sweden. Joined by a Danish Squadron in May, the Fleet continued into the Gulf of Finland. In the autumn the fleet returned to England anchoring off the Gunfleet on 1 November. In 1727 she was the flagship of Rear-Admiral Sir George Walton assigned to Sir John Norris's Fleet in the Baltic. The British Fleet made such a demonstration in the Baltic that the Russians laid up their ships and abandoned their designs on Sweden. In October 1727 she joined Vice-Admiral Wager in the Straits of Gibraltar. Later in 1727 she was under Captain Samuel Atkins. She returned home and paid off in 1728 to be placed in Ordinary.

She was recommissioned in 1731 under the command of Captain Digby Dent (until 1734) as guardship at Portsmouth. Later in 1731 she was ordered to be fitted for service in the Mediterranean. She was in service in the English Channel in July 1732. She was once again reduced to the guardship role at Portsmouth in August 1732. In 1735 she was assigned Captain Alexander Geddes as commander for service with Sir John Norris's Fleet at the Tagus off Portugal. She was paid off on 4 May 1737 into Ordinary.

== Disposition ==
She was ordered rebuilt at Woolwich by Admiralty Order (AO) 7 March 1739. This rebuild was not done. She was fitted as a hulk in 1739/40 at Portsmouth. She underwent a middling repair between October and December 1742, She was finally broken at Portsmouth by AO 11 May 1762, and completed in May 1762.
