= Henrik Fisker (admiral) =

Danish naval officer and politician

Henrik Lorentz Fisker
- Born: 4 January 1720; Copenhagen, Denmark
- Died: 20 June 1797 (aged 77); Copenhagen, Denmark
- Burial place: Holmens Cemetery, Copenhagen
- Relatives: Lorentz Henrik Fisker (1774)
- Military career
- Allegiance: Denmark
- Branch: Royal Danish Navy
- Service years: 1733-1790
- Rank: Admiral
- Awards: Order of the Elephant (1774)

Admiral Henrik Lorentz Fisker (4 January 1720 – 20 June 1797) was a Danish naval officer and politician. He was the son of an attorney at the supreme court, and deputy mayor of Copenhagen. From the age of thirteen as a cadet in the Danish-Norwegian navy, he rose through the ranks to vice admiral in 1775 and full admiral in 1790. He died 20 June 1797 and was buried in the Holmens Kirkegård, the Danish naval cemetery, in Copenhagen.

== Early career ==
As a junior lieutenant, Fisker saw service in the Royal Navy from 1739 to 1742, and again as a senior lieutenant from 1744 to 1746.

In 1753, as captain of the armed merchant ship Friderich og Lovise, he was sent to reinforce the Danish squadron off Morocco and at the same time carry the diplomat Andreas Æreboe to the area.

From service in the West Indies as captain of the frigate Docquen in 1755 - 1756, he then took the ship-of-the-line Neptunus to the Mediterranean and Constantinople.

== 1761 ==
In 1761 he was again in the Mediterranean, this time with ship-of-the-line Grønland including a team of scientists on board. (His 9-year-old son Lorentz was also on board, at the start of an equally illustrious career, but fell ill and was left to convalesce on Malta). In November of that year, the merchant ship Den Flyvende Engel, in a convoy escorted by Grønland was detained and searched by the British ship of the line HMS Shrewsbury, after which Fisker gave up command of his ship and travelled back to Denmark overland from the Mediterranean to face a court martial. He was acquitted of any professional wrongdoing.

== Later career ==
In 1766, while captain of the ship-of-the-line Prins Friderich he was adjutant to the head of the Danish navy. 1770 he was at the Admiralty college, and in 1773 he was in overall command of the flotilla which carried Prince Carl of Hessen and Princess Louise to Norway, where Fisker was the most senior naval officer.

From 1775 to 1780 he was commanding officer of Frederiksværn naval dockyard (modern day Stavern) and of the Norwegian flotilla. On return to Denmark, Fisker was engaged in several important commissions, including that concerning the introduction of gunboats for near coastal defence, as well as being chairman of that covering the Norwegian flotilla. He also served as presiding officer over a number of courts martial. He was ennobled shortly prior to his death.
