= Lorentz Fisker =

Royal Dano-Norwegian Navy Officer

Lorentz Henrik Fisker
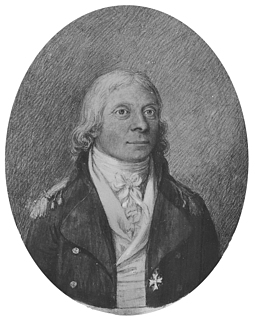
- Miniature portrait drawing of Fisker by Bertel Thorvaldsen created onboard the frigate Thetis in 1796.
- Born: 5 October 1753; Copenhagen, Denmark
- Died: 1 January 1819 (aged 65); Copenhagen, Denmark,
- Burial place: Holmens Cemetery, Copenhagen
- Relatives: Henrik Fisker (father)
- Military career
- Allegiance: Denmark–Norway
- Branch: Royal Dano-Norwegian Navy
- Service years: 1762-1810
- Rank: Counter-Admiral
- Awards: Grand Cross of the Order of the Dannebrog

Counter-Admiral Lorentz Fisker (5 October 1753 – 1 January 1819) was a Royal Dano-Norwegian Navy officer who charted the Skagerrak and Kattegat and served in the French Revolutionary and Napoleonic Wars.

== Early life ==
As the son of Vice-Admiral Henrik Fisker, Lorentz (Note: Fisker's first name is spelt in the teutonic form Lorentz in most references, but in the Danish form Lorens on his gravestone. The Danish source articles name him as Lorentz.) Henrik Fisker accompanied his father on many voyages to the Levant, gaining so much experience that, at the age of only nine years, he was listed as a volunteer cadet in the Royal Dano-Norwegian Navy and at 14 years old (in 1767) was already a junior lieutenant. In 1761 Lorentz had been on board the Grønland, captained by his father, on a voyage to the Mediterranean whose main purpose was to deliver members of the Royal Danish Scientific Expedition to Arabia Felix (modern day Yemen) to Constantinople. As the Grønland was passing Malta, young Lorentz fell ill and his father left him on the island in the care of some nuns. On the ship’s return, Lorentz had recovered and came back on board. Thirty-five years later, in 1796, when Lorentz Fisker was himself a captain, namely of the frigate Thetis, he had a tour of duty in the Mediterranean and visited Malta on many occasions. One of the nuns who had nursed him back to health was by now the Abbess, and she had delivered to the Thetis each day a silver tray of magnificent cakes. (Note: The source for this story appears to be letters written by Fisker in 1796 to his wife, as recorded in Thiele’s Thorvaldsens Ungdomshistorie (1851))

1770–71

Fisker served on the ship-of-the-line Sophie Magdalene under the Admiral Frederik Christian Kaas off Algiers.

== American War of Independence ==
1778

He went into the French naval service on the staff of Admiral Grasses, and later was second-in-command of a number of French frigates.

1779–1782

Fisker was present at the French capture of the British colony of Grenada and the naval battles that followed. In the ship of the line Le Dauphin Royal under Guichon’s command he had three encounters with the Royal Navy under Admiral George Rodney, and later at the investment of Yorktown where General Charles Cornwallis surrendered with 6,000 men. Amongst several other fights, where he took part in the capture of two British corvettes, he also participated in the Battle of the Saintes near Dominique where Rodney defeated Grasse. Awarded the French Order “pour le merite militaire” Fisker’s contributions were acknowledged by the French foreign office. He was recalled after peace was declared in 1783. (Note: During this time Fisker was promoted, by the Danish Admiralty, to the rank of commander but as the orders issued in February 1780 were not received until November 1781 (!!) Fisker lost seniority to Otto Lütken, which gave rise to some ill-feeling.)

== In Home Waters ==
1783–1796

Fisker had a busy period during which he was part ship's captain, part surveyor and map maker of the Danish and Norwegian coasts. (Note: In 1786 orders were issued to Lorentz Fisker to investigate all the inlets, fjords, coves and bays on the southern Norwegian coast between Frederickshald and Lindesnæs, and in 1787 similarly to chart the Kattegat and Great Belt.) In 1788 he was second in command of the royal yacht Hvide Ørn when the crown prince visited Norway. and later that year was appointed as adjutant to the Russian Admiral Von Dessen, who was in command of a joint Russian-Danish squadron. In this position he came to take a major part in the inquiry into the Benzelsterna case (Note: Lars Benzelsterna was a Swedish naval officer who planned (unsuccessfully) to burn the Russian fleet while it was frozen in at Copenhagen. Lorentz Fisker arrested Benzelsterna as the latter was trying to escape disguised as a coachman.)

In 1789 he was promoted to captain, and in the same year he married Charlotte Amalie Kofoed, daughter of the Director of the Post Office and of the Prison Service.
As captain of various ships, Fisker served in the Danish home fleet, including the ship-of-the-line Ditmarsk, and the frigate Fredericksværn in 1792 when this was a cadet training ship. In 1795 he travelled extensively in Jutland and the duchies of Schleswig and Holstein (Note: The Danish monarch was, constitutionally, only Duke of Schleswig, of Holstein and of Lauenberg. See Schleswig-Holstein Question) to determine the needs and positioning of coastal batteries.

1796–1797

The service in home waters was broken by a year in the Mediterranean in command of Thetis where he delivered the annual tribute to the Bey of Algiers. Fisker had diplomatic, but unsuccessful, talks with the old Bey of Tripoli, before being relieved by Steen Andersen Bille.

On this voyage he carried the artist Bertel Thorvaldsen to Malta. Among some fifty miniature portraits by Thorvaldsen are drawings of his fellow passengers made during this voyage

1800–1805

Back in Danish waters, Fisker was on the Trindel Light commission (Note: Trindel is a rocky reef northeast of Læsø, now (2012) being restored and managed as a marine nature reserve) and, on land, enquiring into sites for placements of signal telegraphs.
In 1805 he was head of a squadron of various types of gunboats undergoing trials of their performance and suitability for coastal defence.

== Active Service in Norway ==
After having worked as a recruitment officer in Norway, he joined (in 1806) the Construction Commission, but at the outbreak of hostilities with Britain the following year he was once again unemployed. In a very frank letter to the Prince Regent (later Frederick VI) he drew attention to Norway's unprotected state, as a result of which he was appointed Adjutant General of the navy in Norway and soon after as chief of the entire Norwegian naval defence - continuing the work already started by Jens Schou Fabricius and Hans Christian Sneedorff of reorganising Norway's preparedness. Within a year, with indefatigable hard work, he had a considerable number of gunboats and small armed vessels in service and in addition had improved harbour defences, and the coastal militia.

On 27 April 1808, in the war against Sweden, he advanced with 24 gunboats towards Strömstad on the Swedish border, but at Furuholm met with strong resistance and had, after ninety minutes of battle, to retire.

== Conflict with Fellow Officers and the Admiralty ==
1809

Promoted to Flag Rank, from Norway Fisker submitted his 1809 proposals for the conquest of Heligoland and the recapture of the island of Anholt. The 1809 Anholt expedition came to nought, frustrated by late winter storms, and the 1810 attempt, led by Jørgen Conrad de Falsen, failed miserably. Still, with the gunboats and brigs in Norwegian waters the Danish-Norwegian forces were able to capture, at various times in 1809, a total of two British brigs, 1 cutter, and 107 merchant ships. On 9 October 1809 Fisker was promoted to counter admiral. In this year Fisker was decorated with the Commander Cross of the Order of the Dannebrog.

1810

Lorentz Fisker had personally laid the plans for the Norwegian brigs’ attack on a large British convoy in the Skagerrak in July 1810. The plan met with total success, with 48 merchant ships being stopped and brought into various Norwegian harbours and before prize courts. The auction thereafter of ships and cargoes raised some 5.2 million rigsdaler. (Note: modern day value of at least £20 million, based on corn, silver and gold price comparisons) Fisker was disappointed, however, that he was awarded only the flag officer’s portion, whilst the portion reserved for the Admiralty went to governors who had had nothing to do with the affair. As Fisker had already undertaken a division of the prize money to the men under him, Michael Johannes Petronius Bille rejected the protest. This gave rise to considerable friction between Fisker and Michael Bille, and later with other colleagues – a conflict that left Fisker embittered and that was only resolved in 1816.

== Death ==
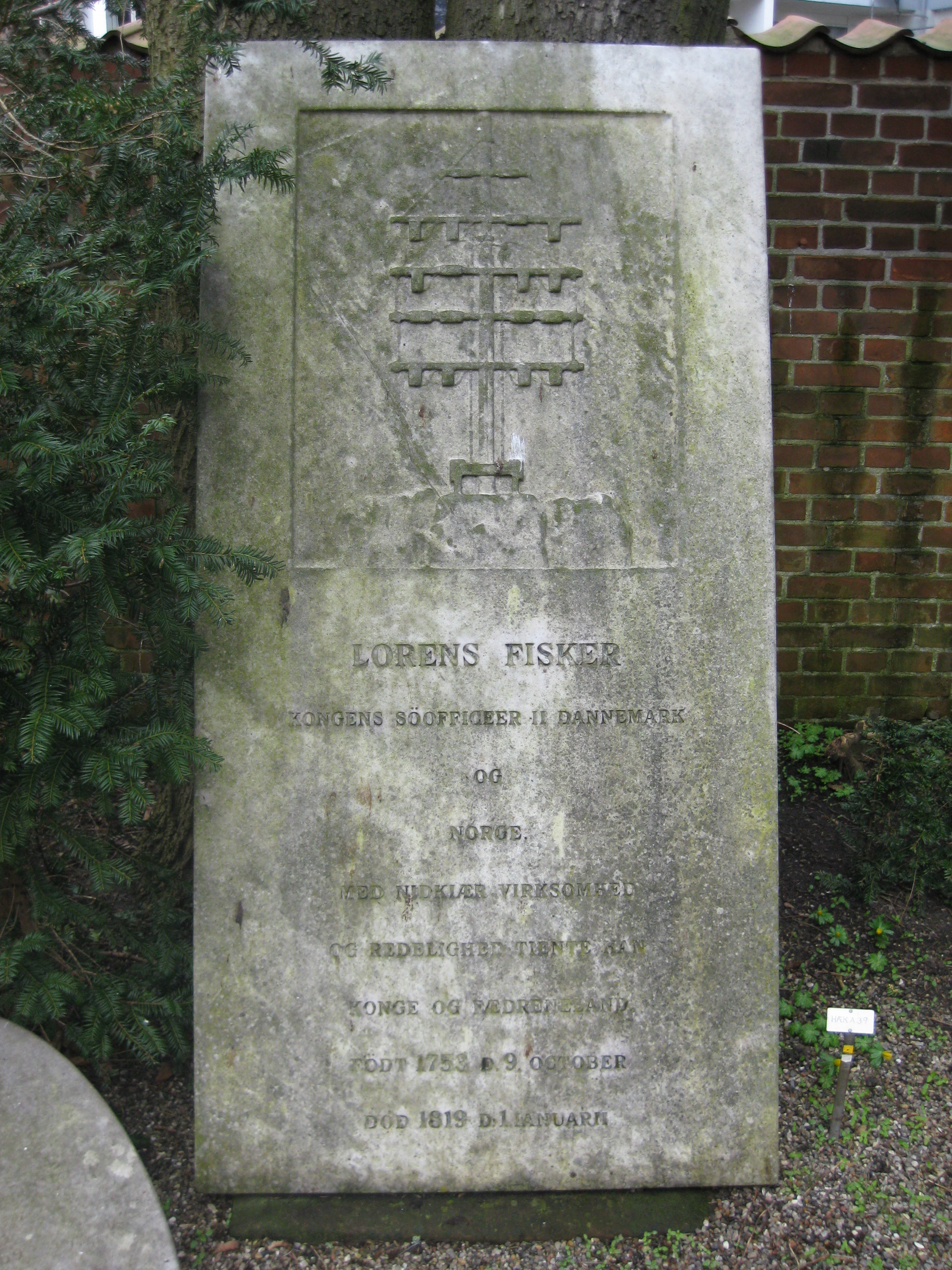
Lorentz Fisker's gravestone in Holmens Graveyard

He retired from the service in 1810. With prize money paid out in 1812, Fisker bought properties near Hellestrup and Ringsted on Zealand. In 1812 he received the Grand Cross of the Order of the Dannebrog.

He died in 1819, and was buried in Holmens Cemetery in Copenhagen.

== Citations ==
- This article is largely translated from the Danish Wikipedia article da:Lorentz Fisker which article acknowledges the Danish Biographical Dictionary edited by C.F.Bricka, Gyldendal (1887–1905) - see Project Runeberg as the primary source.
- (in Danish)Project Runeberg: C With on Lorentz Fisker in Danish Biographical Dictionary
- Thiele: The Life of Thorvaldsen, Collected from the Danish of J. M. Thiele, by M. R. Barnard Paperback – 8 Aug. 2019 This is a reproduction of the original artefact from 1865 translated by M R Barnard.
- (in Danish)T. A. Topsøe-Jensen og Emil Marquard (1935) “Officerer i den dansk-norske Søetat 1660-1814 og den danske Søetat 1814-1932“. Two volumes. Download here.
- (in Danish)Topsøe-Jensen, Th.: Lorentz Fisker in Dansk Biografisk Leksikon at lex.dk accessed 9 June 2020
