= HDMS Grønland =

Danish-Norwegian ship of the line

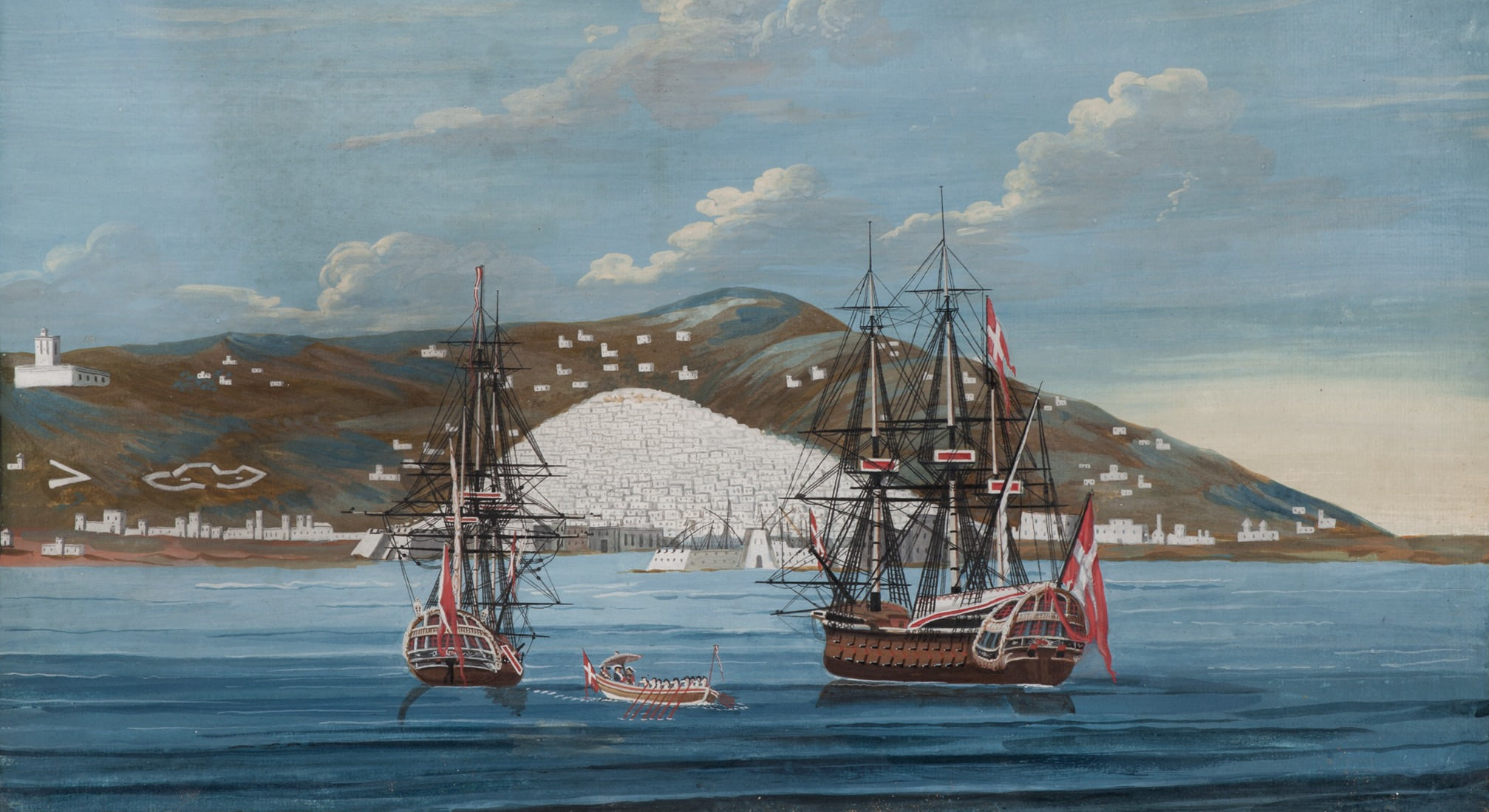
- Grønland (right) together with the frigate Falster off Algiers in 1772

History

Denmark
- Name: HDMS Grønland
- Builder: Danish Naval Shipyard, Nyholm, Copenhagen, Constructor: Turesen/Gerner
- Yard number: 15
- Laid down: 1 Sept 1755
- Launched: 27 Nov 1756
- Decommissioned: 1791
- Home port: Copenhagen

General characteristics
- Class & type: Ship of the line
- Length: 43.7 m (143 ft)
- Beam: 11.9 m (39 ft)
- Draught: 5.7 m (19 ft)
- Sail plan: Full rigged
- Complement: 424
- Armament: 22 18 pound cannons; 22 12 pound cannons; 6 6 pound cannons

HDMS Grønland (Greenland) was a ship of the line of the Dano-Norwegian Navy, built in 1756 (Note: six technical drawings of this ship are available on-line at the Danish Naval Museum website (click vis)) and decommissioned in 1791. Grønland spent considerable time in the Mediterranean Sea, where she protected Danish merchant convoys. Grønland took part in the bombardment of Algiers in 1770 but otherwise did not see any action in battle. It is noted in the Danish Admiralty's papers that she was an unusually seaworthy ship.

== Convoys in the Mediterranean Sea ==
During the first years in service Grønland spent a significant part of her time in the Mediterranean Sea, where she escorted Danish merchant ships. Denmark-Norway was not part of the seven-years' war (1756–63), and the merchant fleet was thus threatened by both French and British privateers. Although Denmark-Norway was neutral, the French merchant brothers Couturier had persuaded the Danish King Frederik V to provide a navy ship as protection for Danish ships transporting goods from the Levant to Marseille for the brothers. This arrangement ended, however, when the British ship of the line HMS Shrewsbury under the command of Hugh Palliser managed to capture a Danish merchant ship Den flyvende Engel. Den flyvende Engel was part of a convoy that Grønland, under command of Henrik Lorenz Fisker, was escorting. Shrewsbury had 70 cannons against Grønland's 50, which likely contributed to Fisker's decision not to open fire. Because of the incident, Fisker was replaced by Simon Hoogland in Marseilles, and he was later brought for a court-martial when he returned to Denmark. However, he was cleared of all charges.

=== The Danish Arabia Expedition ===
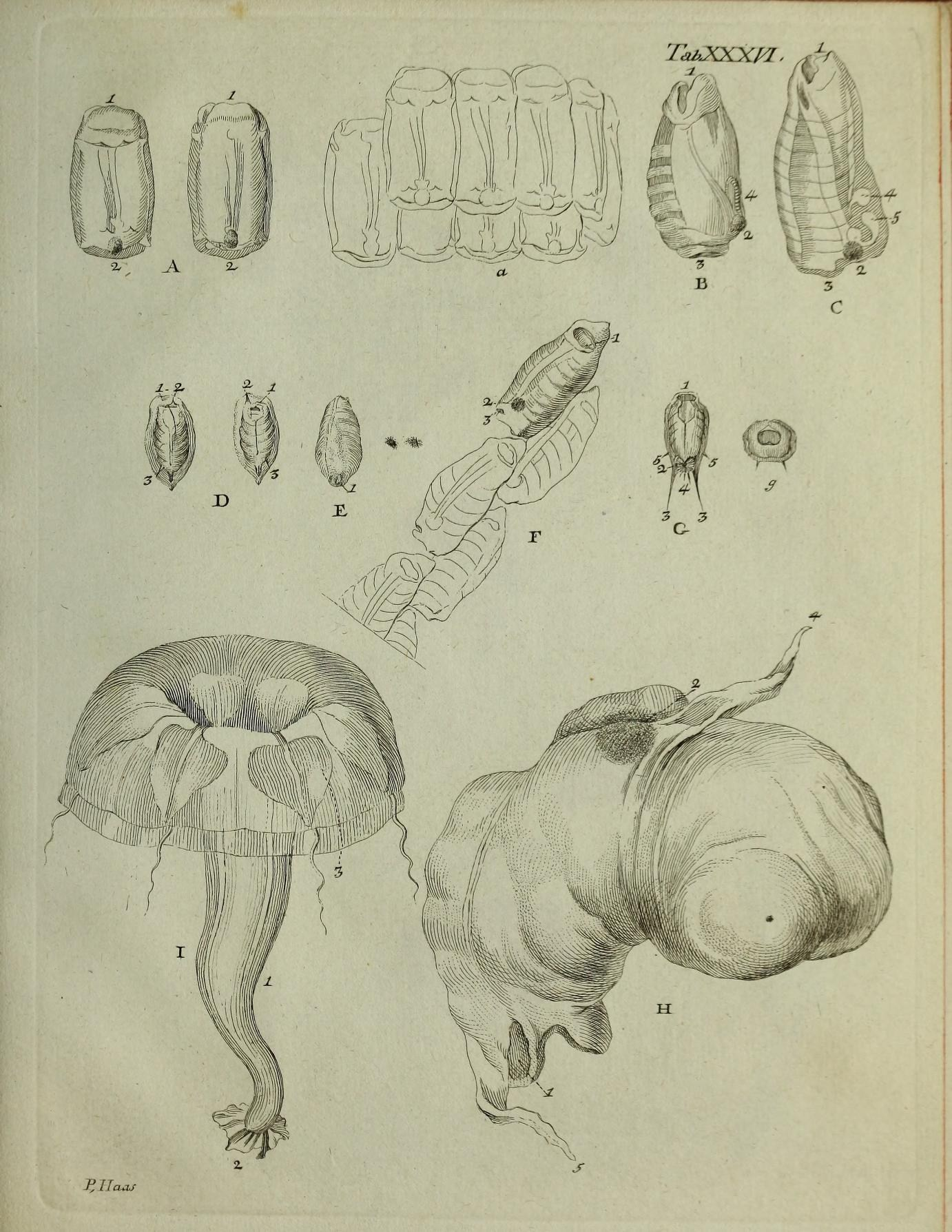
Salps described by Forsskål

The first voyage to the Mediterranean by Grønland in 1761 can be said to be the world's first oceanographic expedition, as the ship had on board a group of scientists appointed by Frederik V for an expedition to Arabia. The group consisted of linguist Frederik Christian von Haven, surveyor Carsten Niebuhr, naturalist Peter Forsskål, physician Christian Carl Kramer, artist and painter Georg Wilhelm Baurenfeind, and assistant Lars Berggren. One of the explicit tasks of the expedition was to study and describe the marine life in the open sea, including finding the cause of mareel, or milky seas. For this purpose, the expedition was equipped with nets and scrapers, specifically designed to collect samples from the open waters and the bottom at great depth.

Grønland brought the expedition as far as Cairo, where the expedition continued over land to explore the Arabian Peninsula (in particular present day Yemen) and the Red Sea. Only one member of the expedition, Carsten Niebuhr, survived and returned to Denmark in 1767, but he brought with him the enormous collections, especially those of Forsskål. His descriptions of animals collected, together with drawings and sketches by Baurenfeind, were posthumously published as the book Descriptiones Animalium, which stands out as one of the most important contributions to natural history in the 18th century. Many of the specimens collected by Forskål are today among the most valued treasures of the Natural History Museum of Denmark. Also, the many detailed maps made by Niebuhr and ethnographic observations and artifacts collected by the expedition still today provide one of the most important sources of information about life in 18th-century Yemen.

== Later years ==
Grønland mostly served in Danish waters, but after a major overhaul in 1769, she was again sent to the Mediterranean in 1770 in what is known as the Danish–Algerian War. This time under the command of Commander Count Moltke and in a fleet that also included three other ships of the line, two frigates, two gunboats, and two transport ships, in total 3000 seamen and 516 soldiers. The fleet was sent on a mission to resolve a dispute with the Dey of Algiers about the taxes paid by Dano-Norwegian ships for passage. The fleet, under the command of Admiral Frederik Christian Kaas, bombed Algiers from the sea, but was unsuccessful in making a deal with the Dey. Two years later Greenland again returned to Algiers, this time under the command of Admiral Hoogland, and negotiated a treaty with the Dey.

After returning to Copenhagen, Grønland served as a guard ship and in the last years as part of the moored blockade of Copenhagen, until she was decommissioned in 1791.
