= Lancelot Brown (MP) =

English politician

Lancelot Brown (13 January 1748 – 28 February 1802) was an English politician.

He was a member (MP) of the parliament of England for Totnes from 1780 to 1784, Huntingdon from 1784 to 1787, and Huntingdonshire from 1792 to 1794.
