= Johan Cornelius Krieger =

Johan Cornelius Krieger may refer to:

- Johan Cornelius Krieger (architect) (1683–1755), Danish architect and gardener
- Johan Cornelius Krieger (1725–1797), Danish naval officer
- Johan Cornelius Krieger (1756–1824), Danish naval officer
- Johan Cornelius Krieger (1818–1894) , Danish army officer
- Johan Cornelius Krieger (1917–1984), Danish army officer
- Johan Wilhelm Cornelius Krieger (1788–1857), Danish naval officer
