= Kaas (surname) =

Kaas is a surname. Notable people with the surname include:

- Carl Waaler Kaas (born 1982), Norwegian orienteering competitor
- Erling Kaas (1915–1996), Norwegian pole vaulter
- Frederik Christian Kaas (1725–1803), Danish admiral
- Frederik Christian Kaas (1727–1804), Danish admiral
- Herman Munthe-Kaas (1890–1977), Norwegian architect
- Hugo Munthe-Kaas (1922–2012), Norwegian intelligence agent and resistance fighter
- Jon Kaas, professor and scientist
- Ludwig Kaas (1881–1952), German priest and politician
- Niels Kaas (1535–1594), Danish politician and diplomat
- Nikolaj Lie Kaas (born 1973), Danish actor
- Patricia Kaas (born 1966), French singer and actress
- Preben Kaas (1930–1981), Danish actor

== Danish naval officers ==
For a list of 17 Danish naval officers with this surname, see Kaas (Danish Naval Officers)
