= HDMS Najaden (1796) =

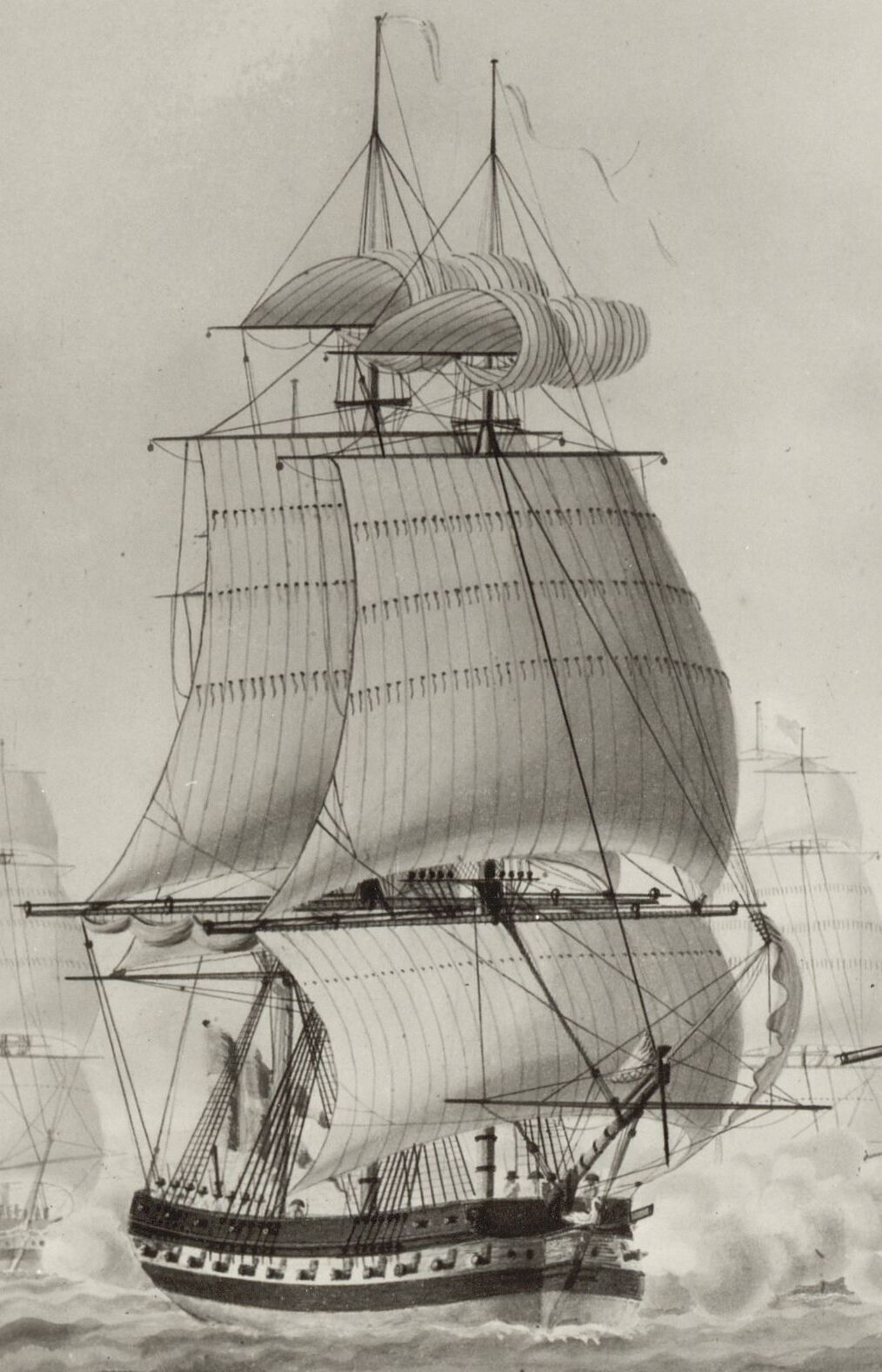
- Najaden at the action of 16 May 1797

History

Denmark & Norway
- Name: Najaden
- Builder: Nyholm Naval Dockyard, Copenhagen
- Laid down: 11 August 1795
- Launched: 11 August 1796
- Fate: Surrendered to the British after the Battle of Copenhagen

United Kingdom
- Name: Nyaden
- Acquired: Captured from Denmark 7 September 1807
- Commissioned: 1808
- Fate: Broken up May 1812

General characteristics
- Class & type: Fifth-rate frigate
- Tons burthen: 90875/94 (bm)
- Length: 140 ft 3 in (42.7 m) (gundeck); 119 ft 4 3/8 in (36.4 m)(keel)
- Beam: 38 ft 0 in (11.6 m)
- Depth of hold: 10 ft 5 1/2 in (3.2 m)
- Complement: 254 in British service
- Armament: In Danish service: Some descriptions refer to her as having 36 × 12-pounder guns; In British service: Upper Deck: 26 × 18-pounder guns; QD: 12 × 32-pounder carronades; Fc: 2 × 9-pounder guns + 2 × 32-pounder carronades

HDMS Najaden (Danish: "The Naiad") was a frigate of the Royal Dano-Norwegian Navy, which she served from 1796 until the British captured her in 1807. While in Dano-Norwegian service she participated in an action at Tripoli, North Africa. She served the Royal Navy as the fifth rate HMS Nyaden (or Nijaden) from 1808 until 1812 when she was broken up. During her brief British service she participated in some small attacks in the Barents Sea during the Anglo-Russian War. (Note: There is an excellent treatment of both Najaden and the other frigates in the online article by Eric Nielsen)

== Design ==
Najaden was the first ship that the great Danish naval architect F.C.H. Hohlenberg designed after he returned home from training abroad. She had several revolutionary innovations and bore more resemblance to 19th century sailing warships than 18th century examples. (Note: The Danish ending "en" equates to the definite article in English; when captured British ships were brought into Danish service they gained an article as part of the name - see "The Seagull") HDMS Nymphen was the only other member of the class.

Najaden had a slab-sided hull and the typical Hohlenberg pinkie stern, with a place for two stern chaser guns. Gardiner suggests that the pinkie stern and increased tumblehome towards the stern permitted the vessel to fire over the quarters. Naval warfare in the Baltic made extensive use of oared gunboats, which would fire on becalmed vessels from the quarter, an angle that normally broadside guns could not cover. The pinkie stern was unpopular with the British, who removed it when they refitted her.

Compared to many British frigates of the same period, her main gun deck ports were closer to the water (at 6 feet (1.8 m) when loaded with full supplies), and she had less carrying capacity for supplies. This made sense as Hohlenberg expected that her primary area for operations would be the Baltic, but it would have been difficult for her to be in full action in heavy weather in the open Atlantic.

== Dano-Norwegian service ==
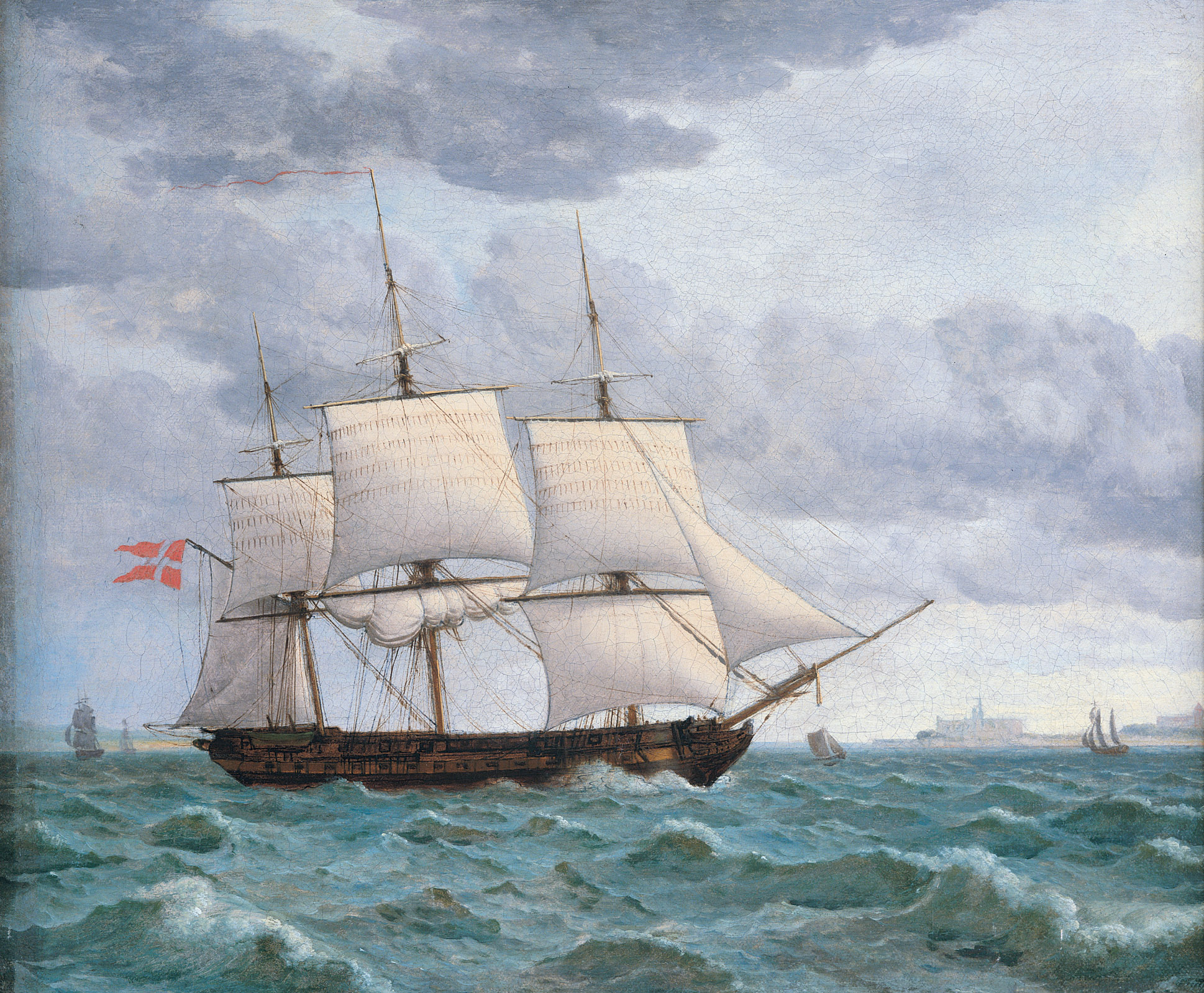
Painting of Najaden shortly after she was commissioned

The future vice admiral, Johan Cornelius Krieger, was captain on her sea trials after commissioning. The trials were overseen by another future flag officer, R H Tønder. Much of the ship's service in the next eight years would be in the Mediterranean, continuing the diplomacy and convoy protection demanded by the Danish–Algerian War and the Barbary Corsairs

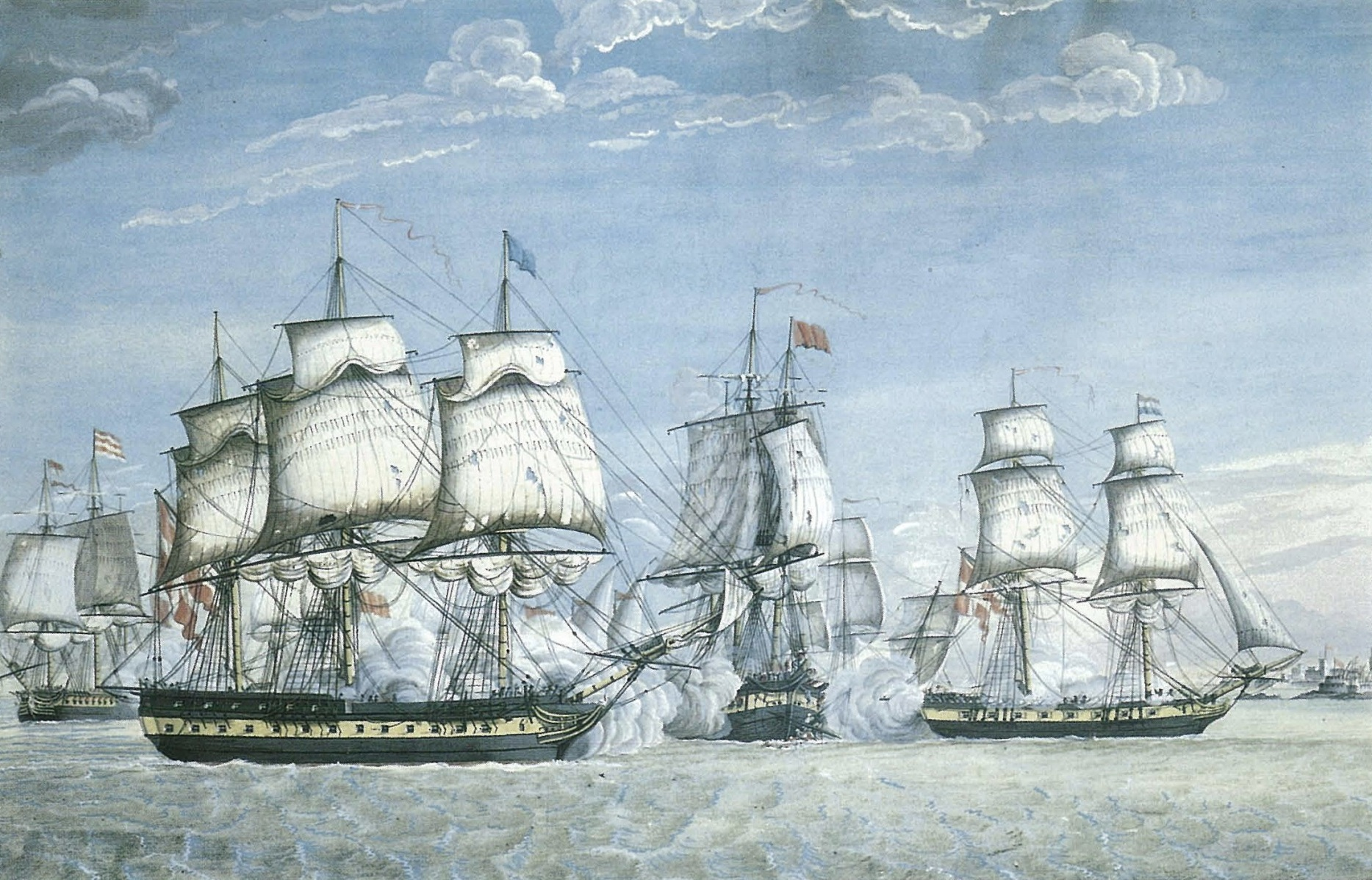
Najaden (second from left) at the action of 16 May 1797

In the action of 16 May 1797, Najaden, under Captain John Hoppe, with Captain Steen Andersen Bille in overall command, led a small squadron that also included Sarpen and a hired xebec in an attack at Tripoli. The battle lasted for about two hours before the Tripolitans retreated. The Danes suffered one man killed and one wounded. As a result of the Danish victory, the Bey of Tripoli signed a peace treaty with Denmark on 25 May.
Najaden was released from the Mediterranean squadron in August 1798, shortly after Steen Andersen Bille's return from his embassy to Morocco.

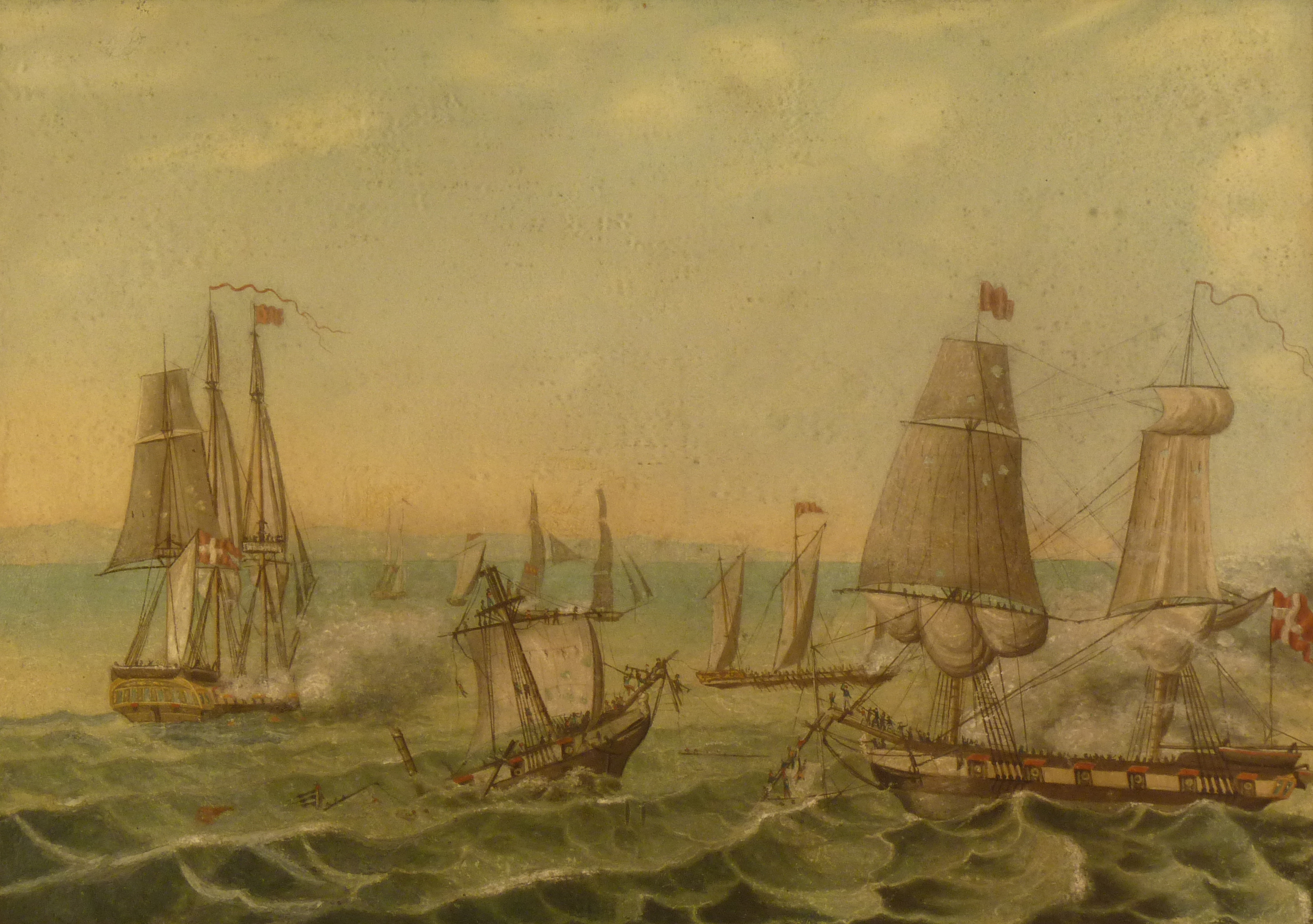
Action near Tunis on 31 May 1800.

Late in 1798 Najaden, again under Captain Johan Cornelius Krieger, convoyed seven ships from Flekkerø to Malaga. One of the ship's officers was Andreas Schifter who was captured in May 1800 and held prisoner by the Bey of Tunis for three months. Najaden completed her tour of duty and was ordered home (with Sejeren, Freia and Havfruen) leaving Malaga on 29 March 1801, arriving near Bergen on 24 April 1801.

In 1804 Najaden returned to the Mediterranean with Captain Friderich Christian Fisker, who reported on the loss of one of the ship's boats in August near Marseille and a fire from lightning strike in the foretop sail in September. (Note: It appears Najaden returned to Denmark before the end of 1804, or early 1805, as many of her officers took up home duties in 1805.)

== British service ==
=== Capture ===
The British captured Najaden at the Battle of Copenhagen on 7 September 1807. Lieutenant John Gore brought her home in October. She was to be renamed Hephaestion but the Admiralty canceled the name change. After refit she joined the British Navy as HMS Nyaden (sometimes given as Nijaden).

=== Anglo-Russian War ===
Nyaden was commissioned under Captain Frederick Cottrell (or Cotterell) in February 1809 and may have sailed for Greenland on 2 March. Under Cottrell Nyaden participated in at least one and possibly two actions during the Anglo-Russian War. In June 1809 her boats, under the command of her senior lieutenant, A. Wells, participated in a night raid on Kildin Island that wiped out a Russian garrison. Boats from the Nyaden also captured some 22 or 23 coastal trading vessels in the Kola River, many upriver from the present city of Murmansk. The landing party took away the fort's guns or threw them into the Kola River.

On 9 June Nyaden captured the Russian vessels Peter Metropolite, Neptune, and Magnum Brostrum, for which prize money was paid on 4 July 1811. Then on 15 June Nyaden captured two Russian vessels, Rolla and Czar Constantine, for which prize money was paid on 23 February 1810. Unfortunately, it is unclear what connection, if any, these vessels had with the raid on Kildin.

Nyaden was probably the vessel whose boats in July took possession of Catherine Harbour, in the ostrog or fortified settlement of Kola. The British also commandeered all the stores belonging to the White Sea Company (est. 1803 at Archangel), consisting of salt, cordage etc., as well as some vessels loaded with corn. The Times reported that this was the first British amphibious landing on a Russian territory, news of the attack on Kildin Island either being subsumed or overlooked. The Russian account of the incident is that a British vessel sent two boats with 35 men under a lieutenant. Kola had been demilitarized during the reign of Paul I, but its citizens quickly formed a militia corps of about 300 men under the command of the merchant Matvey Gerasimov to resist the attack. However the Governor, fearing possible reprisals, forbade any resistance so most of population of the town (numbering roughly 1,000 individuals) left Kola with their goods. The British force entered the town unopposed, sacking Kola before arresting the Governor and other government officials. They then returned to their ships and left, after capturing all vessels present in the bay.

=== Leeward Islands ===
Nyaden sailed for the Leeward Islands on 14 January 1810. On the way, on 17 January, she and Dannemark, with Hamadryad in company, captured the brig Thomas. (Prize money was available for payment on 24 November 1812.)

On 8 and 10 July Nyaden captured Marrimack and Sally. (Prize money was paid on 19 November 1816.)

While she served in the Leeward Islands she suffered an epidemic of yellow fever that killed 47 of her crew. On 19 April 1811 Cottrell died of "a rapid consumption" while Nyaden was off Barbados. His replacement was Captain Robert Merrick Fowler. Later, she came under the command of Captain Farmery Predam Epworth.

In the spring of 1812 she was carrying dispatches from Lisbon back to Great Britain when a flotilla of five French ships of the line that had escaped from Lorient spotted her. The French ships pursued Nyaden and shots were exchanged, but although some shots damaged her rigging, she managed to flee and warn a convoy of three East Indiamen, Northampton, Monarch, and Euphrates. The French, bound for Brest, continued on their route without giving chase.

== Fate ==
Nyaden was broken up in May 1812.

== Post script ==
The British took the lines off Najaden, and they are available at the National Maritime Museum in Greenwich. The Royal Danish Naval Museum holds a set of the 1795/96 plans for the Najaden, signed by Hohlenberg.
