= Kaas (Danish naval officers) =

== Danish naval officers surnamed Kaas ==
- Ahasverus Kaas (1693 - 1744) Captain
- Bernhard Kaas (1764 - 1795) Senior Lieutenant. son of rear admiral Wolfgang K.(see below)
- Christian Ulrich Kaas (1731 - 1803) Commodore. son of Ahasverus (see above).
- Frantz Kaas (1658 - 1690) Junior Lieutenant (no naval forebears or issue)
- Frederik Kaas (1730 - 1759) Captain. died in battle with an English warship in East Indies 10 September 1759. Presumably Battle of Pondicherry son of admiral Ulrich K. (see below)
- Frederik Christian Kaas (1725–1803) Admiral. son of Hans K. (see below)
- Frederik Christian Kaas (1727–1804) Admiral. son of admiral Ulrik K (see below)
- Georg Conrad Kaas (1762 - 1808) Captain. died November 1808 when his ship ran aground on Kragerø. son of Frederik Christian K. (1725) (i.e. the topmost F C K) .
- Hans Kaas (1683 - 1737) Commodore
- Hans Michael Kaas (1760 - 1799) Captain. son of Frederik Christian K. (1725) (i.e. the topmost F C K) . See HDMS Hvide Ørn (1798) and HDMS Nidelven
- Jørgen Grubbe Kaas (1716 - 1740) Senior Lieutenant. son of Ulrich K.
- Malta Kaas (1721 - 1774) Senior Lieutenant. son of Ulrik K., brother to Jørgen Grubbe K.
- Ulrich Kaas (1677 - 1746) Admiral. Also da:Ulrik Kaas
- Ulrik Christian Kaas (1729 - 1808) Admiral. son of Ulrich K. Captain of HDMS Mars at Algiers in 1770 Also da:Ulrik Christian Kaas
- Ventsel Rotkirk Kaas (1721 - 1743) Junior Lieutenant son of Ahasverus K., brother to Wolfgang
- Wolfgang Kaas (1724 - 1778) Rear Admiral. son of Ahasverus K., brother to Ventsel Rotkirk K.
- Wolgang Kaas (1776 - 1840) Commodore. son of Rear Admiral Wolfgang K.

arranged by family
Ahasverus

Christian Ulrich, Ventsel Rotkirk, Wolfgang

Bernhard, Wolfgang

Hans

Frederik Christian (1725)

Georg Conrad, Hans Michael

Ulrich

Frederik, Frederik Christian (1727), Jørgen Grubbe, Malta, Ulrich Christian

Frantz (with no naval forebears)

== Citation ==
- (in Danish)Gravsted website
- (in Danish)Projekt Runeberg - Danish Biographical Lexicon - Vol IX page 71
- (in Danish)Salmonsen konversationsleksikon 2 Ed. Vol XIII p 339
- (in Danish)T. A. Topsøe-Jensen og Emil Marquard (1935) “Officerer i den dansk-norske Søetat 1660-1814 og den danske Søetat 1814-1932“. Two volumes. Download here.
