= Frederik Christian Kaas =

Frederik Christian Kaas may refer to:

- Frederik Christian Kaas (1725–1803), Danish naval officer
- Frederik Christian Kaas (1727–1804), Danish naval officer
