= Dano-Algerian War =

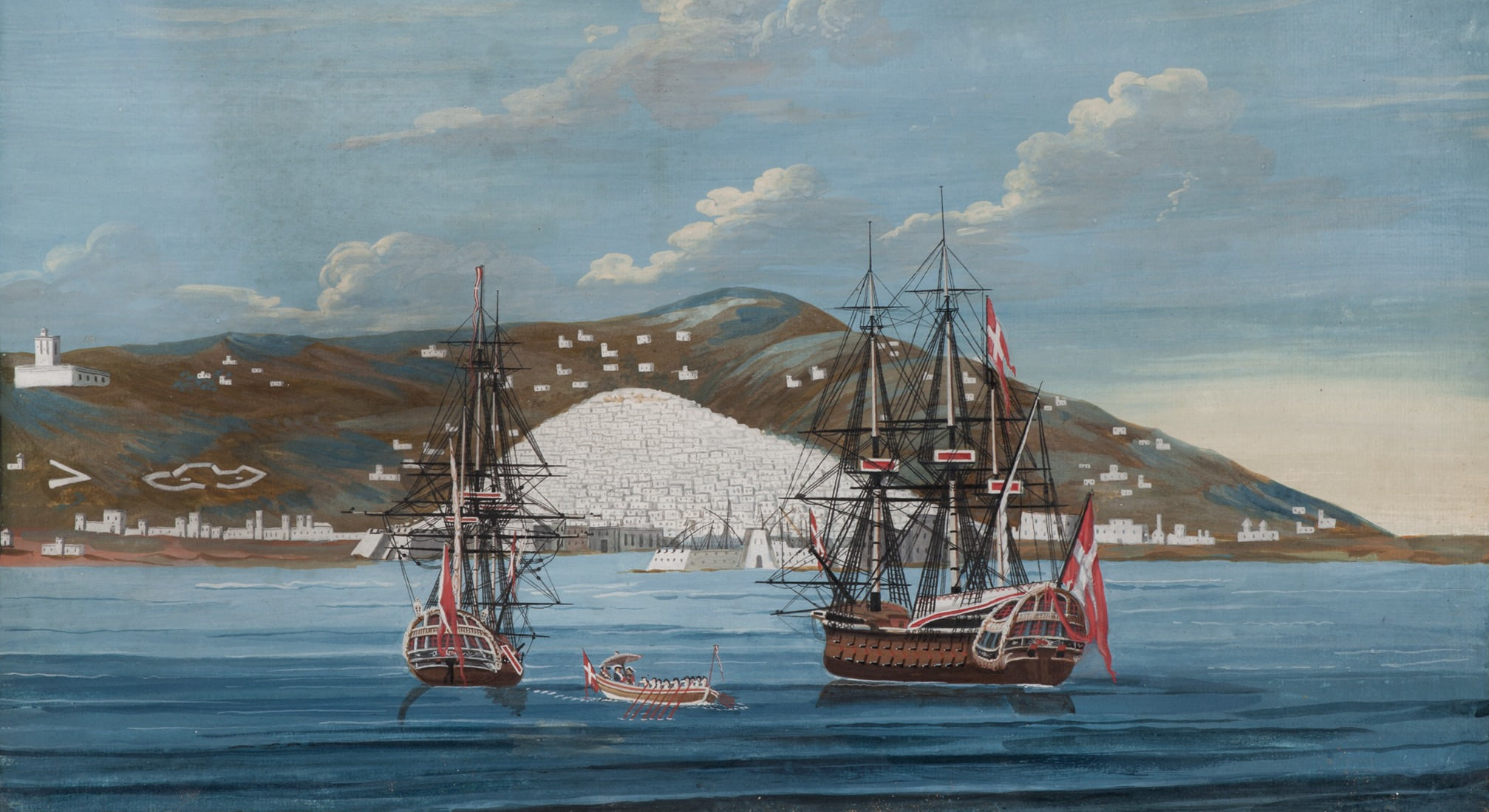
- Danish frigate Falster and ship of line Grønland near Algiers, 1772
| Date | 14 September 1769 – 16 May 1772 (2 years, 245 days) |
| Location | Near Algiers, Regency of Algiers |
| Result | Algerian victory |

Belligerents
| Denmark–Norway | Algiers; Tunis |

Commanders and leaders
| (Denmark–Norway) Christian VII (Denmark–Norway) Frederik Kaas (Denmark–Norway) Peter Wleugel (Denmark–Norway) Simon Hooglant | (Regency of Algiers) Muhammad V (Regency of Algiers) Salah Bey (Beylik of Tunis) Ali ibn Hussein |

Strength
| 6 frigates 10 bomb galiots 4 ships of the line 2 carrier ships 7 warships 2,911 sailors and soldiers | Unknown |

Casualties and losses
| Unknown | Unknown |

The Dano-Algerian War (Danish: Krigen mellem Danmark-Norge og Algier, Arabic: قصف الجزائر) was a conflict lasting from 1769 to 1772 between Denmark–Norway and the Regency of Algiers. The latter of which was functionally and mostly independent from the Ottoman Empire. It is also known as the Algerian Expedition (Danish: den Algieriske expedition), or in Denmark as The War Against Algeria (Danish: Krigen mod Algier).

== Background and beginning of conflict ==
Danish-Norwegian trade in the Mediterranean greatly expanded in the mid-1700s. In order to protect their lucrative business against piracy, Denmark–Norway had secured a peace deal with the states of Barbary Coast, involving the payment of an annual tribute to the individual rulers of those states and additionally to the States.

In 1766 Baba Mohammed ben-Osman became Dey of Algiers. He demanded that the annual payment made by Denmark–Norway should be increased, and he should receive new gifts. Denmark–Norway refused the demands. Shortly after, Algerian pirates hijacked three Danish-Norwegian ships and sold the crew into slavery.

== Response ==
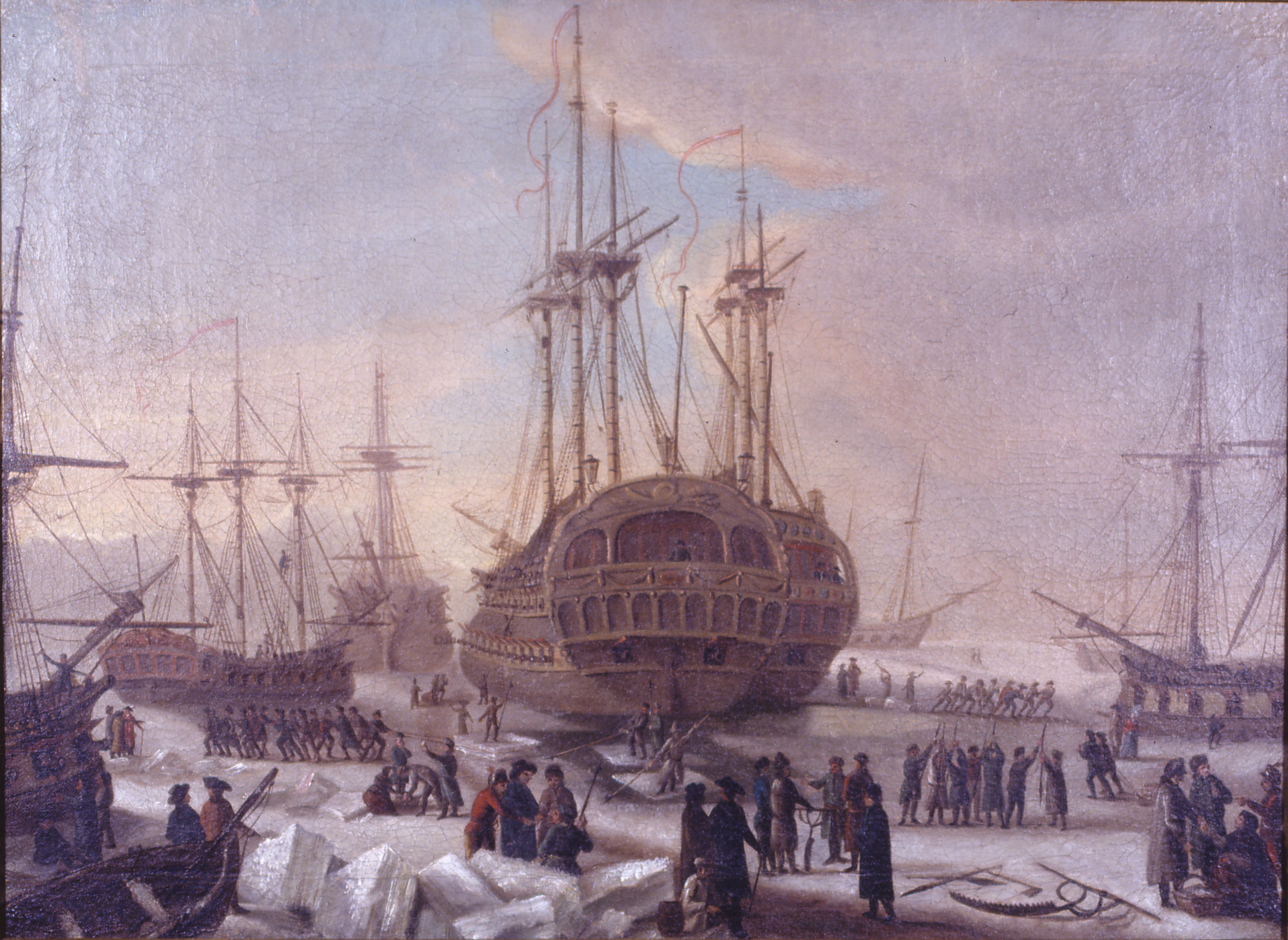
The Danish eskadre in Copenhagen Harbour, 1770

A punitive expedition comprising four ships of the line, with two frigates and two bomb galiots, under the command of Frederik Christian Kaas, sailed from Copenhagen on 16 May 1770. They threatened to bombard the Algerian capital if the Algerians did not agree to a new peace deal on Danish terms. Algiers was not intimidated, and the Danish-Norwegian bombardment ended in failure, as a large part of the crew fell seriously ill due to an outbreak of typhoid. The ships could not withstand heavy mortar attacks from the Algerians, which damaged their hulls. The Danish-Norwegian contingent fired approximately 75 bombs at the city of Algiers before the attack had to be abandoned. The contingent then resorted to a blockade of the city.

The De Fire Søstre, a merchant and hospital ship, was present with the Danish squadron in the Mediterranean from 1770 to 1771, and its captain, Jens Knudsen, visited the sick who had been landed at Port Mahon.

== Aftermath ==
In 1772, a delegation was sent to Algiers, and after five days of negotiations a new peace was concluded in which Algiers was well-paid. In addition, Denmark–Norway had to pay for the return of each slave who had been captured during the war. Danish and Norwegian slaves who were sold to private slave owners had to individually negotiate the prices of their freedom.

Today the war is mostly forgotten in Denmark and Norway, because it played a small role in Danish and Norwegian history.

== In fiction ==
The 2013 novel 1001 natt by Vetle Lid Larssen follows two Norwegians enslaved during the war.

== See also ==
- List of wars involving Denmark
- List of wars involving Norway
- List of conflicts in Algeria
- Action of 16 May 1797
- Turkish Abductions
