= De Fire Søstre (Danish ships) =

Name of five historical Danish ships

De Fire Søstre (English: The Four Sisters) was the name of five separate ships which served purely as merchant ships or, for part of their lives, hospital and supply ships to the Danish fleet. (Note: Depending on the source of any reference, the ship name may be reported under the letter D or the letter S)

== Danish Royal Navy ships ==
De Fire Søstre (pre-1737)

This ship acted for much of its career as a fleet auxiliary captained by officers commissioned in the Royal Danish Navy. (Note: Judging from the ranks of the commanders – Captain Lieutenant (just below full captain) - the ship was possibly a frigate, although this is not specified in the available references) Converted (or rebuilt) in 1740, under Captain-Lieutenant Hans Christian Lund, she is described as a fleet merchant ship. In 1741 she carried a cargo of hemp from Riga to the Danish shipyard at Holmen, Copenhagen.

In 1761, under Captain-Lieutenant Gottlieb Joachim Dilleben, De Fire Søstre was employed by the Danish Customs Department acting against smugglers in Danish waters. Under P G M Schultz the ship is described as a hospital ship and troop transport, taking troops to Norway in 1762 and then as the hospital ship in the fleet in 1763. She may have continued the anti-smuggling duties into 1764.

De Fire Søstre (1764)

De Fire Søstre was a merchant ship designed by F M Krabbe and built at Nyholm naval dockyard, Copenhagen. (Note: The Record card reports the year of naming, as 1762 – not the year of launch)
In the campaign against the Algerian corsairs of 1770 -1772 the ship, captained by Jens Knudsen served as a hospital ship to the Danish Mediterranean squadron. This was her last mission as she was decommissioned in 1771.

== Civilian ships ==
De Fire Søstre (pre-1750)

The ship was built in Germany, bought in Altona and worked in the whaling trade from 1752 to 1758. After 1750 it belonged to det Almindelige Handelskompagni (the Ordinary Trading Company) of Copenhagen. The ship was registered in Denmark, apparently as an ordinary merchant ship.

De Fire Søstre (1791)

Built in Svendborg on the Danish island of Funen by Niels Hansen in 1791, this ship was rigged as a yacht with a single mast. She was owned and operated out of Svenborg from 1825 to 1849 by H J Baagøe (Shippers). Her final fate is not recorded.

De Fire Søstre (1850)

Built by L J Bager in Marstal, this ship was launched on 11 May 1850. Measuring 44.5 ft by 13.1 ft and with a draught of 6.9 ft, she was rigged as a yacht with a single mast. From 1850 to 1891 this ship was known as De Fire Søstre, sometimes recorded as De 4 Søstre. De Fire Søstre was initially owned jointly by two men, Rasmus Olsen of Skælskør and Hans Clausen Christensen of Marstal. After 1877 the former became the sole owner. After 1891 it was renamed Caroline of Marstal. As Caroline she plied her trade until 1901, owned by Captain Claus Christensen Eriksen of Marstal. (Note: Eriksen is NOT listed as an officer of the Royal Danish Navy)
