= Steen Andersen Bille (1751–1833) =

Danish naval officer

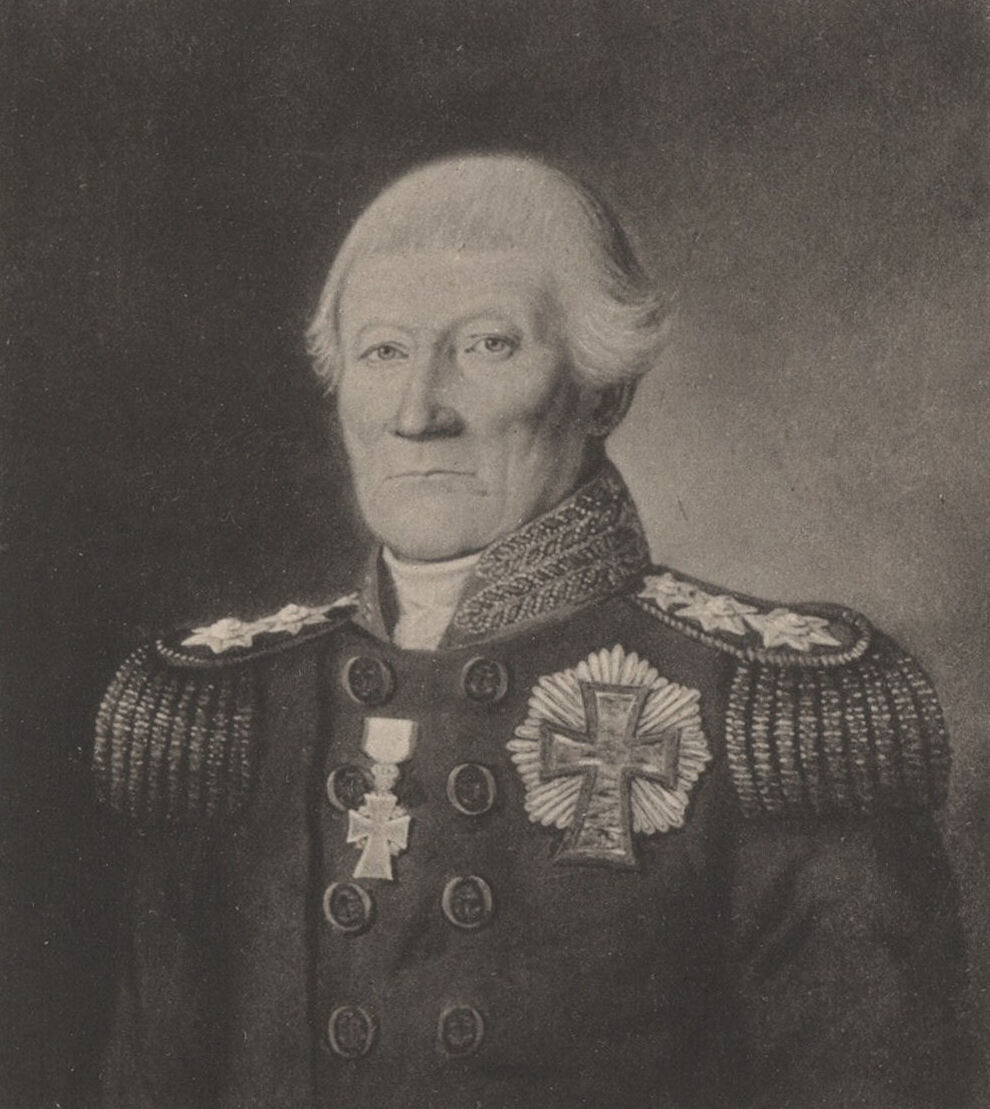
- Portrait of Bille
- Born: 22 August 1751; Assens, Funen, Denmark
- Died: 15 April 1833 (aged 81)
- Burial place: Holmens Kirkegård, Copenhagen
- Spouse: Frederikke Bornemann (m. 1790)
- Children: 4, including Vice Admiral Steen Andersen Bille
- Relatives: Rear Admiral Daniel Ernst Bille (Father)
- Military career
- Allegiance: Denmark–Norway (1762-1814); Denmark (1814-1833)
- Branch: Royal Dano-Norwegian Navy; Royal Danish Navy
- Service years: 1762–1833
- Rank: Admiral
- Conflicts: French Revolutionary Wars; Action of 16 May 1797; War of the Second Coalition; Battle of Copenhagen; Gunboat War; Battle of Copenhagen
- Awards: Grand Cross of the Order of the Dannebrog

Admiral Steen Andersen Bille (22 August 1751 – 15 April 1833) was a Danish naval officer. A member of the Bille family, he rose to the rank of admiral and became a privy counselor during the period of Denmark-Norway's policy of "armed neutrality" following the Gunboat War. (Note: The Gunboat War was part of the Napoleonic Wars, which the Danes refer to as the English Wars.) He was instrumental in the rebuilding of the Danish Navy after 1814.

== Early life ==
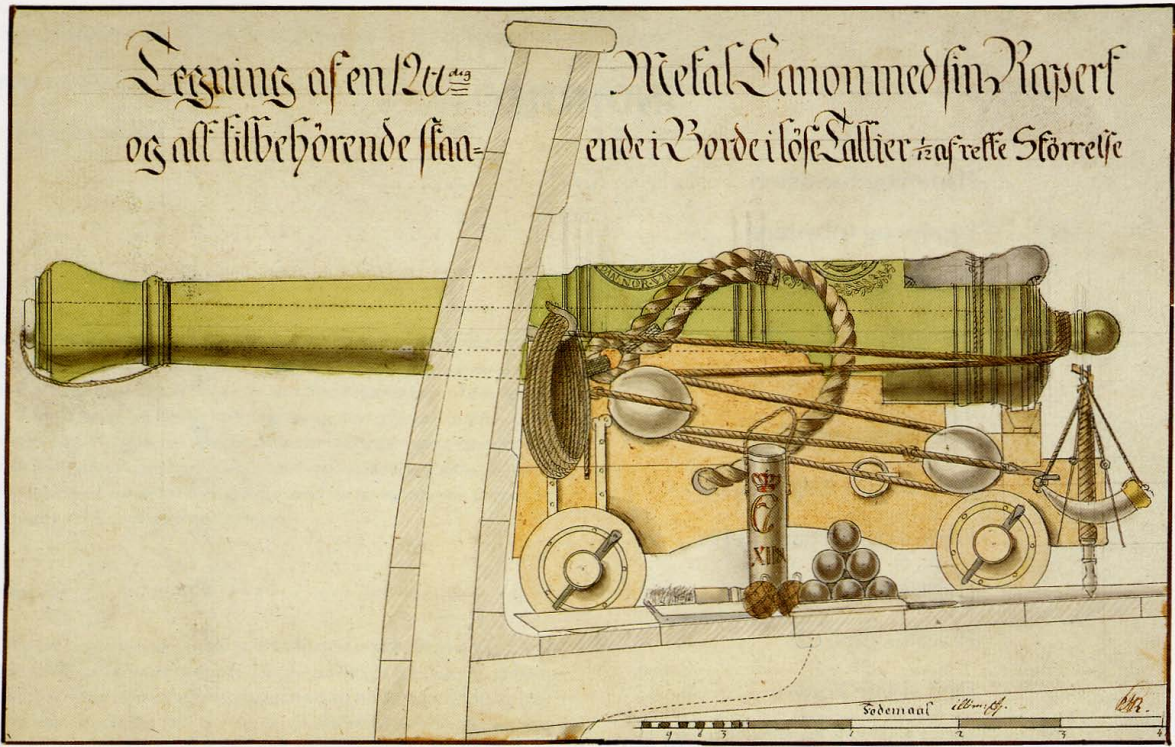
Drawing of a 12-pound canon created by Bille as a cadet (scale 1:12).

Steen Andersen Bille was born on 22 August 1751 in Assens, on the Funen coast of the Little Belt, where his father Rear Admiral Daniel Ernst Bille was then stationed. Steen Andersen Bille became a cadet at the age of eleven, despite being of poor physique, having already experienced a trial voyage in the previous year.

In 1765, as a cadet, Bille was in the frigate Hvide Ørns when storms and contrary winds held the ship in the Baltic for so long that it was feared the ship would founder – prayers were said in churches around the land for the ship's safety (to good effect, seemingly). As one of the most able cadets of his year, he was promoted to Junior Lieutenant on 16 March 1768, serving then, and again in 1773, in the ship-of-the-line Norske Løve under his father's command.

On 22 March 1773 he was promoted to Senior Lieutenant. In 1775 he had an independent armed command in the merchant ship Mercurius preventing smuggling to enforce control measures against an outbreak of Rinderpest (Cattle Plague) in Schleswig Holstein.

== The Indies – West and East ==
In 1777 he was posted to the Danish West Indies (DWI) for two years where he became close friends with the Governor General Peter Clausen and two future Governors, Ernst Walterstorff and Peter Oxholm. On his return to Denmark he became second-in-command of the frigate Bornholm, which returned almost immediately to the DWI. Sixty of the crew, including Bille, became sick and were left on St Thomas as the ship escorted a convoy to Guadeloupe. On the way the convoy encountered three British privateers and all the merchant vessels Bille was escorting were captured. This upset Bille for a long time afterwards, despite his court-martial judging him to be not be responsible for the loss.

Bille was promoted to Commander on 18 October 1781 and he was immediately permitted to go on a trading voyage in the Danish East Indiaman Copenhagen, one of the poorest sailing ships the company owned. After a difficult voyage to the Dutch Republic, Norway and the East Indies he returned successful, but had suffered many fatalities among his crew. On the outward voyage, scurvy had broken out and not one seaman was fit for duty by the time he reached Cape Town. There Bille also broke an arm, which was not set properly and which gave him problems for the rest of his life. Arriving in Bengal, he sent his second officer home in disgrace, for embezzlement.

For a few years after his return, Bille was in poor health and without a command. During this time he traveled privately to Germany and Paris. Then he received a few commands and at the age of 38 he was promoted to Captain on 6 March 1789. He became flag captain to Admiral von Schindel in Den Prægtige. Later, he commanded Havfruen and other ships.

As head of cadet training in the frigate Fredericksværn in 1795, he earned his students' undying loyalty by allowing them to eat all they wanted each day. In a test in 1796, racing the old Cronborg against the newly built Najaden, Bille's Cronborg was always the victor. That same year, Bille was flag captain in the squadron of Vice-Admiral F C Kaas.

== In The Mediterranean ==
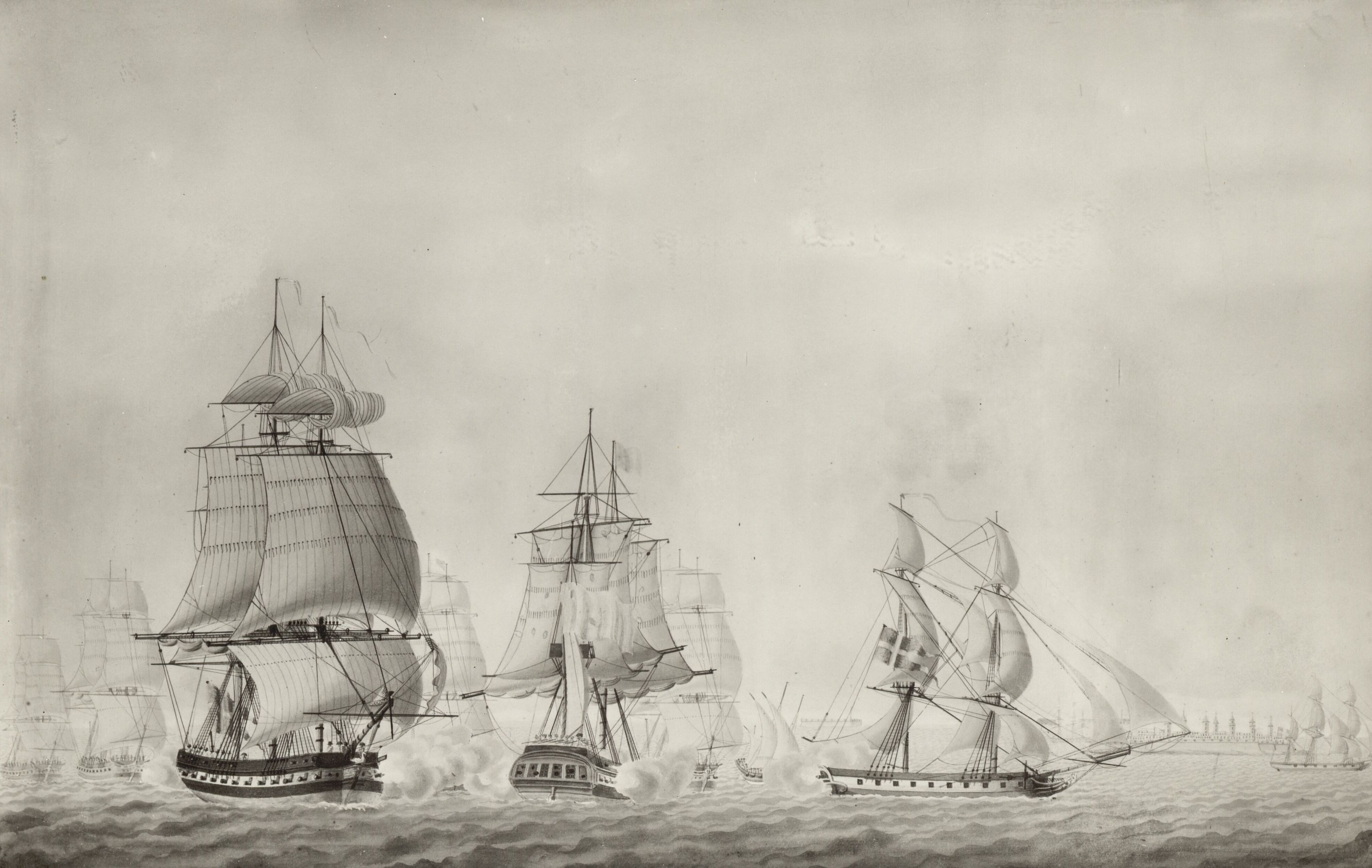
The action of 16 May 1797, where Bille fought an inconclusive action

In the spring of 1797, whilst most of Europe was at war, neutral Denmark-Norway had expanded its trade in the Mediterranean and it was necessary for the country's interests to protect this. The Moors had until now been appeased with annual gifts of tribute, but Tripoli now declared war on Denmark, seizing a merchant ship – the Providentia from Bergen – and selling the crew into slavery.

Bille was given the task of solving the situation and he set sail in Najaden, arriving on 2 May in Malta, where the brig Sarpen and a hired armed xebec were waiting. These ships proceeded to Tripoli harbour where, on 16 May 1797, they successfully fought the Bey of Tunis's ships.

The ensuing peace treaty was favourable to the Danes, and Bille's squadron continued to provide naval cover for all Danish merchant ships in the Mediterranean. Bille himself was promoted on New Years Day 1798 to senior captain (Danish – KomKapt) and honoured with an appointment as Gentleman-in-waiting to the Danish Court. Diplomacy was high on his agenda (he became the ambassador to Morocco), to protect Danish convoys and to negotiate with foreign warships and avoid conflict when they demanded inspection rights whilst maintaining Denmark-Norway's policy of armed neutrality. Bille was recalled from the Mediterranean early in 1801, just as war was about to break out again between Tunis and Denmark-Norway.

== Battles of Copenhagen ==
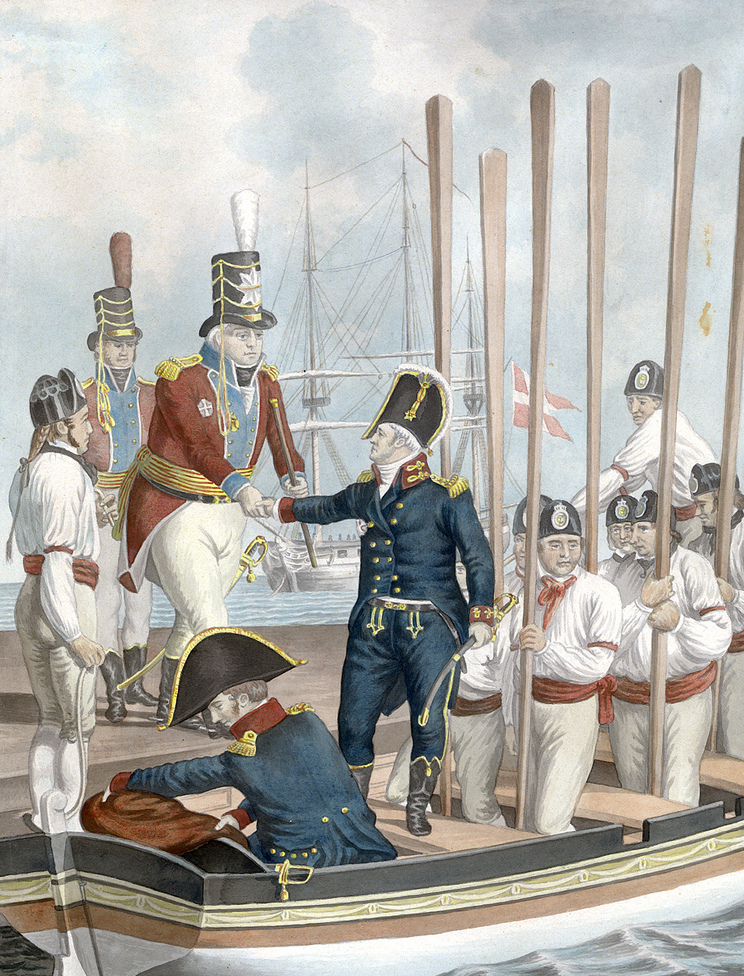
Ernst Peymann saying his goodbye to Bille at the Nordre Toldbod as the latter sets out to attack the British navy on 17 August 1807

On return to Denmark in 1801, Bille was again in action in the Battle of Copenhagen. His position was on the left, i.e. northern, end of the line, which included the ships-of-the-line Danmark and Trekroner, the frigate Iris, brigs Sarpen and Nidelven and a large contingent of gunboats – none of which saw serious action that day. After the battle had been raging on the southern end for close on four hours, British Rear-Admiral Thomas Graves came north with his five ships of the line and three of them ran aground. The British having negotiated a ceasefire after their victory over the Danes, refloated their ships and withdrew.

On 28 December 1804, with further promotion to commodore (Kommandør), Bille became deputy in the Admiralty College. He also held positions on the African Consulate Commission, the Quarantine Commission and the Naval Defence Commission.

After war flared with Britain again in 1807, Bille was named as commander of Danish-Norwegian naval defence under the overall command of Ernst Peymann. Peymann performed poorly against the British army that had landed near Svannemølle and capitulation of Copenhagen became unavoidable. Preparations to sink or burn the Danish fleet at anchor were made, but the expected orders were never received.

At the capitulation on 7 September 1807, Bille refused to append his signature and sought permission from the crown prince (later Frederick VI) to launch what would be a suicide attack with all available weapons. He is quoted (in translation) as saying "I foresaw that my suggestion would achieve nothing other than my own and my naval warriors honourable deaths. In the meantime we could have won enough time that the Fleet might have been destroyed at its anchorage." (Note: Compare this with the actual actions of 29 August 1943 in the same harbour. See Scuttling.) On 9 October 1809 Bille was promoted to counter admiral.

== After the Gunboat War ==
After the British captured the entire Danish fleet, Bille was central in organising gunboat patrols to engage British naval elements in the Baltic, and corresponded with many of the naval officers involved. In 1811 he received the Grand Cross of the Order of the Dannebrog for his efforts.

When Denmark-Norway dissolved after the Treaty of Kiel, it was Bille who led the attempts to establish a Danish navy and with careful financial management establish a reserve fund for the naval service. In 1825 he was promoted to vice admiral, and on 1 August 1829 to full admiral. In 1831 Bille was appointed to the Danish Privy Council.

== Personal life ==
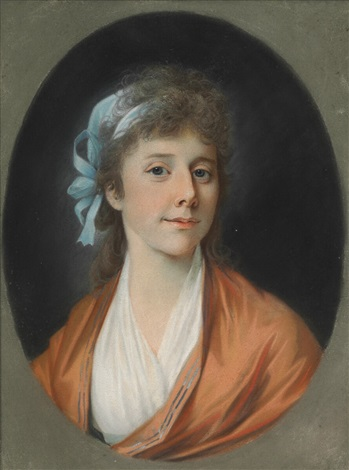
Frederikke Vilhelmine Bille

He married Frederikke Vilhelmine Charlotte Bornemann on 6 December 1790. She was the youngest daughter of Vilhelm Bornemann (1731-1801) and Talche (Thalia) Storm (1738-1779). Her sister Vilhelmine Caroline von Bornemann (1767–1792) was married to Johan Cornelius Krieger, one of Bille's colleagues, who commanded the gunboat flotilla during the Gunboat Ear and later served as chief of Holmen. Bille's bore him four children, Thalia Amalia Bille (1792-1820), Sophie Steensdatter Bille (1794–97), Ernst Wilhelm Bille (1795-1821), and Steen Andersen Bille (1797-1883) who became a vice admiral in the Royal Danish Navy.

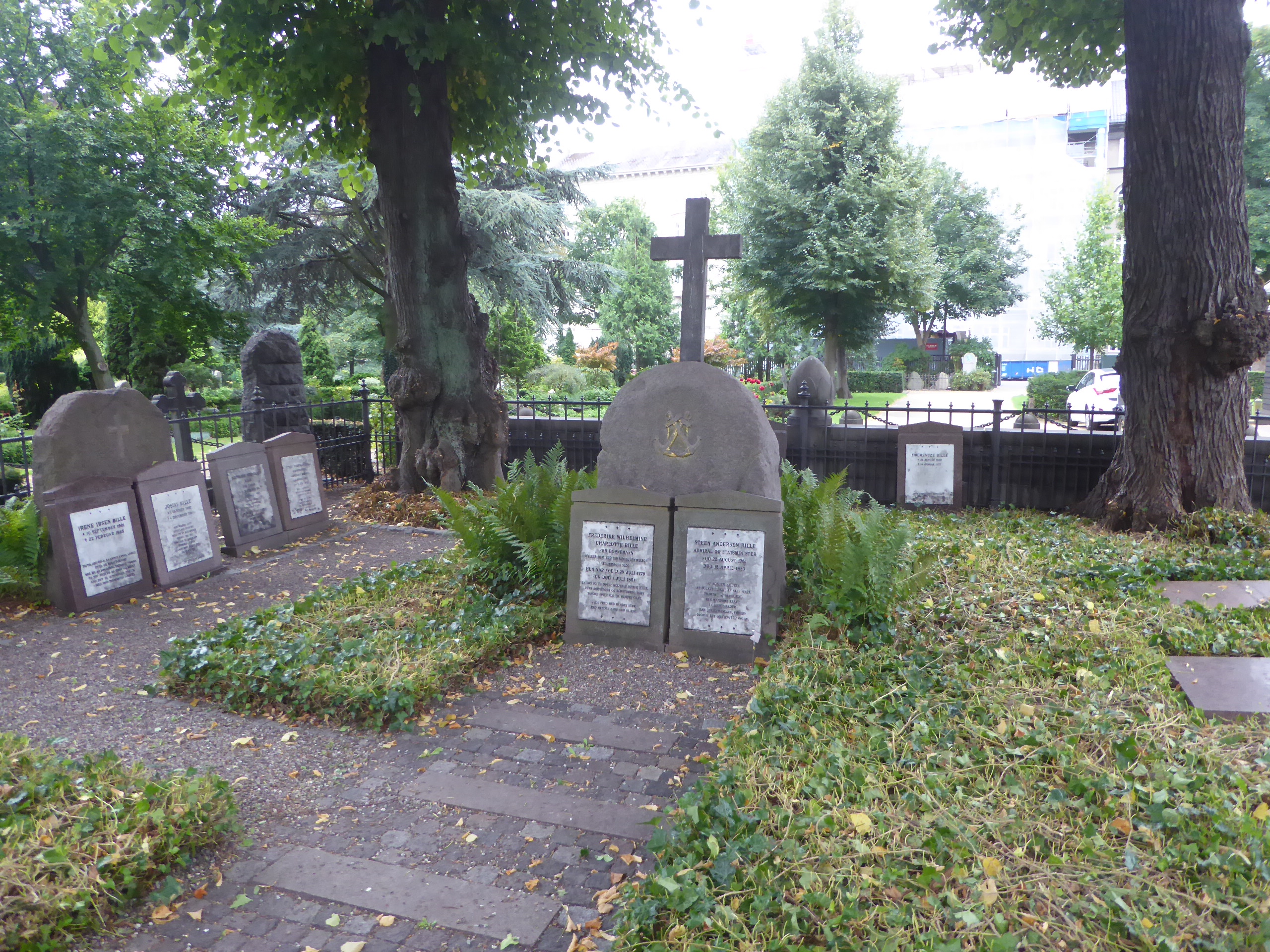
Steen Andersen Bille's grave at the Cemetery of Holmen

In 1795–1797, Bille lived in an apartment at Amaliegade 14. His two next homes were at Købmagergade 38 (1798–1801) and then on Østergade (1802, unknown number). In 1803, he bought half of the Bernstorff Mansion on Bredgade. In 1816, he moved to the Niels Aagesen House on Amaliegade.

“Do right, and fear nobody" was his life's motto. He died on 15 April 1833 and is buried in the Cemetery of Holmen, Copenhagen.

== Notes ==
Footnotes

Citations

=== References ===
- T. A. Topsøe-Jensen og Emil Marquard (1935) "Officerer i den dansk-norske Søetat 1660–1814 og den danske Søetat 1814–1932" (Danish Naval Officers).
- With, C. (1887–1905). "Bille, Steen Andersen, 1751–1833". In Bricka, C.F. (ed.). Dansk biografisk leksikon. Vol. 2 (1st ed.). Gyldendal. pp. 246–251.
