= Johan Cornelius Krieger (naval officer, born 1725) =

Danish naval officer

- Born: February 14, 1725
- Died: July 15, 1797 (aged 72)
- Children: Johan Cornelius Krieger
- Father: Johan Cornelius Krieger

Vice Admiral Johan Cornelius Krieger (14 February 1725 - 15 July 1797) was a Danish naval officer in the service of the Royal Dano-Norwegian Navy. In 1797, he was ennobled by letters patent. He was the father of the naval officer Johan Cornelius Krieger.

== Early life ==
Krieger was born in Copenhagen as the son of royal architect and gardener Johan Cornelius Krieger (1683–1755) and Anne Matthisen (1693–1760).

== Career ==
Krieger became a cadet in 1734, a junior lieutenant in 1743 and a senior lieutenant in 1749. In 1744–47, he was in French service. In 1751–1753, he was second-in-command of the frigate Docquen on a voyage to Morocco. The ship was part of a squadron under command of Simon Hooglant, The other ships were the frigate Falster and three transport ships carrying 350 soldiers under the command of lieutenant-colonel Longueville. The purpose of the expedition was to establish a trading station in Morocco. While the ships were anchored at the Road of Saffa lieutenantcolonel Longueville and senior lieutenant Frederik Christian Kaas, who commanded the transport ships, together with all the soldiers, were arrested by Prince Muhammed. Krieger was therefore sent back to Copenhagen to inform the Danish Admiralty of what had happened. In 1752, he was sent back to Copenhagen to inform the Danish Admiralty of the situation with the Danish captives. In 1754, he was put in charge of a group of smaller vessels hunting smugglers in the waters between Funen and Ærø. In the same year, he was promoted to captain lieutenant. In 1755, he returned to the Mediterranean in the ship of the line Fyb. The next years were spent in home waters. 1758 saw him promoted to captain. In 1759 and again in 1762, he was in command of a frigate as part of a squadron. In 1767, he was in command of the frigate Havfruen on the annual voyage to Maroccco with presents to the local ruler in order to avoid piracy against Danish merchant ships. Ub 1767, he was promoted to commander captain. In 1770–71, he was in command of the ship of the line Sophie Magdalene, with his son as one of the junior officers, as part of Frederik Christian Kass' ill-fated expedition to Algiers. In 1773, he was in command of the ship of the line Neptunus. The ship was tasked with transporeting Prince Carl of Hessen and Princess Louise back and forth to Norway. In 1775, he was promoted to commodore. In 1779 and 17821 he was in command of a ship of the line. In 1781, he was also promoted to counter admiral. In 1782, he became a member of the Regulation Committee. In 1789, he was in command of a squadron in home waters. In the following year, he was promoted to vice admiral. In 1794, he was once again put in command of a squadron.

in 1790. He was created a White Knight within the Order of the Dannebrog in 1792. In 1686, he was ennobled by letters patent,
