= Johan Cornelius Krieger (naval officer, born 1756) =

Danish naval officer

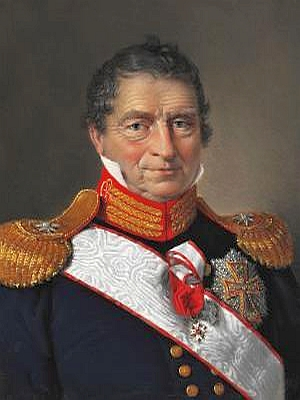
- Johan Cornelius Krieger painted by Christian Albrecht Jensen.
- Born: July 7, 1756; Copenhagen, Denmark
- Died: July 9, 1824 (aged 68)
- Burial place: Assistens Cemetery
- Father: Johan Cornelius Krieger

Counter Admiral Johan Cornelius Krieger (7 July 1756 – 9. July 1824) was a Danish naval officer who served in the French Navy during the American Revolutionary War and in the Danish navy during the Gunboat War. He ended his career as chief /Overekvipagemester) of the Holmen naval base in Copenhagen. He was the father of naval officers Johan Wilhelm Cornelius Krieger and Christian Krieger.

== Early life and family ==
Krieger was born in Copenhagen as the third child and eldest son among the 16 children of Vice Admiral Johan Cornelius Krieger and Sophie Magdalene Arff (173-1816). His paternal grandfather was the architect and gardener Johan Cornelius Krieger. A paternal aunt was married to Admiral Lorentz Fisker.

Five of Krieger's younger brothers—Carl Wilhelm, Severin, Johannes, Antonius and Emmanuel—would also become naval officers. The last two brothers, da:Adolph Frederik Krieger and Ludvig Hannibal Krieger, who became army officers, reached the rank of generalmajor. Their sister Anna Marie Krieger (1758-1826) was married to Jørgen Henrich Rawert (1751-1823).

== Career ==
=== Early career, 1763–1778 ===
Already at the age of seven Krieger made his first voyage as a volunteer cadet. He became a cadet in 1767, and that same year was with the frigate Havfruen to the Mediterranean. In 1770–1881, he returned to the Mediterranean, this time on board the Prinsesse Sophie Magdalene, commanded by his father, as part of Admiral Frederik Christian Kaas' ill-fated voyage to Algiers. The following year he was appointed junior lieutenant, but remained in the Mediterranean until 1772. After some voyages in the squadron and to Iceland, Krieger was promoted to first lieutenant in 1776.

=== French service, 1778–1781 ===
In 1778, he was sent to France with seven other officers to join the French navy in the American Revolutionary War and remained there until 1781. In the many bloody and highly instructive naval battles that were fought in these years in the West Indian waters between the admirals Count d'Estaing, Count de Guichen and Count de Grasse on the French side against Graves, Hood and Rodney on the English side, Krieger took an active part. He distinguished himself on several occasions, was wounded, decorated with the Ordre pour le mérite militaire, was offered an annual pension by the French government (which he refused), and was finally sent home with an extremely laudatory letter from his superior, Marquis Joseph-Bernard de Chabert-Cogolin. Shortly before his return trip he was promoted to lieutenant captain.

=== 1781–1796 ===
In 1781, Krieger was made a member of the Construction Committee. From 1781 to 1783, he commanded a ship for the Danish West India Company. At the end of this period he was appointed adjutant general to the king. During the tense relations with Sweden in 1784, 1788 and 1789 he was assigned to the squadrons that operated together with Russian squadrons, and for a time he was employed as an attaché to the Russian admiral. In 1789 he became a captain. In 1791–98, he was put in charge of overseeing the fitting out of naval ships (ekvipagemester) at Nyholm. Concurrently to this, he served as Harbour Master in Copenhagen and on the Harbour Committee. In the autumn of 1798 he went to the Mediterranean as commander of the frigate Najaden to protect the Danish merchant ships, under the command of Steen Andersen Bille, partly against the North African pirate states, partly against British visitations. In 1800, when relations with England had reached a worryingly tense character, all ships stationed in the Mediterranean were recalled, for which Krieger then took over command; At the end of April 1801 he arrived safely with his fleet in Norway. From 1801 to 1803 he stayed in Norway as a member of a defense commission and then held some short-term commands in home waters until 1807. He became a Commander captain in 1800. In 1802 he resigned from the Construction Committee, in whose meetings he had rarely participated due to his assignments, but in 1804 he became a member of the Regulation Committee and again in 1807–14 a member of the Construction Committee.

=== Gunboat War, 1796–1813 ===
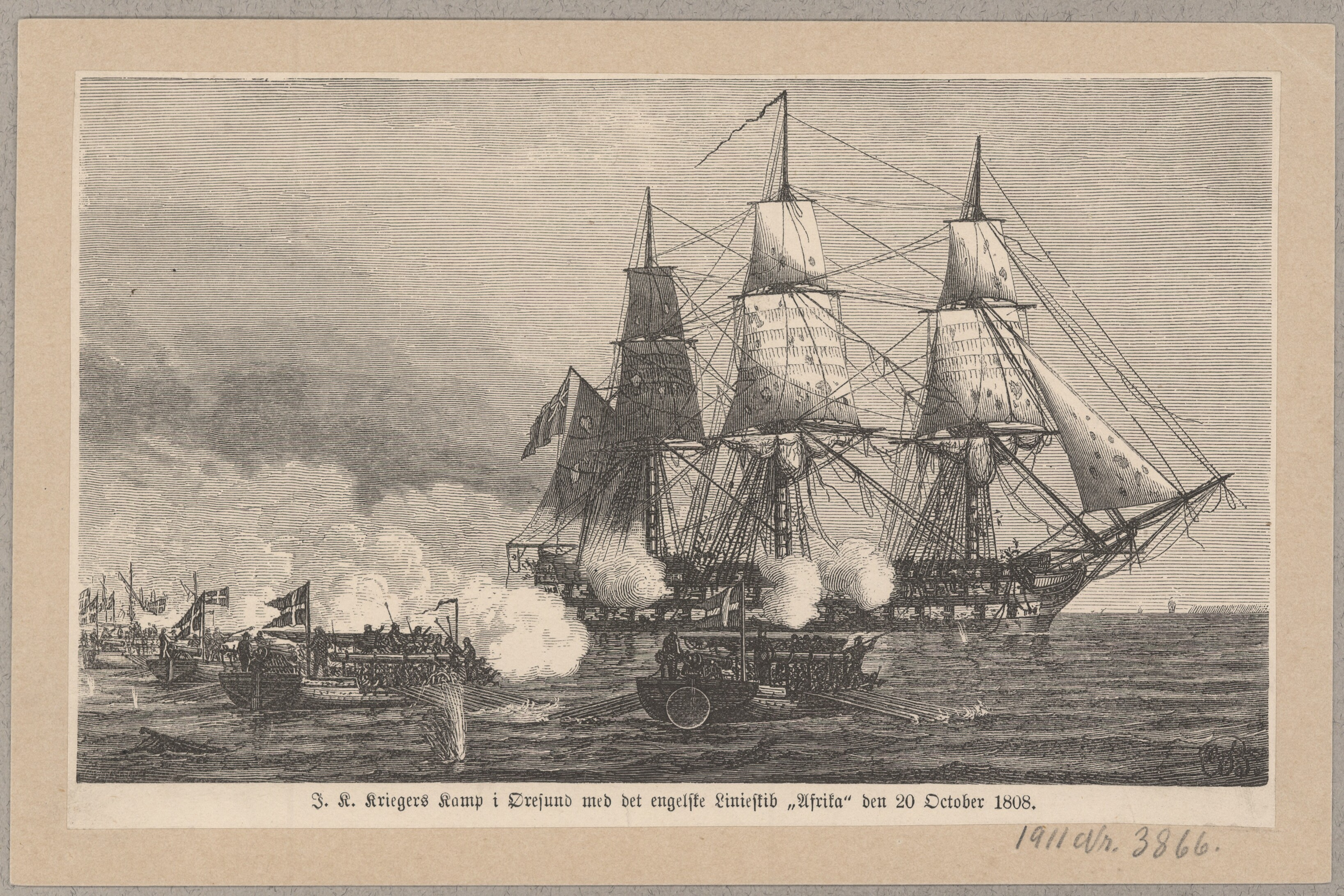
Krieger in combat with HMS Africa on 20 October 1808 in the Øresund..

When the British attacked Copenhagen in 1807, Krieger was quickly given command of the mobile coastal defences; his tireless activity and courage also succeeded in thwarting the British fleet's attack from the sea, although he could not prevent the enemy's bombardment of the city from the land batteries. In 1808, after the British had captured the entire Danish fleet, Krieger was given command of the gunboat defences in Øresund and along the east coast of Zealand. In the same year he was promoted to commander. He used the force under his command, which grew to 33 vessels during the summer, with excellent skill; in June he captured an English brig and a number of Swedish merchant ships, and in October of the same year he drove away with his gunboats the blockading British ship of the line Africa. In 1810, his area of command was expanded to the waters between Nakkehoved and Møn, and in 1812 he was also given command of the gunboats in the Great Belt.

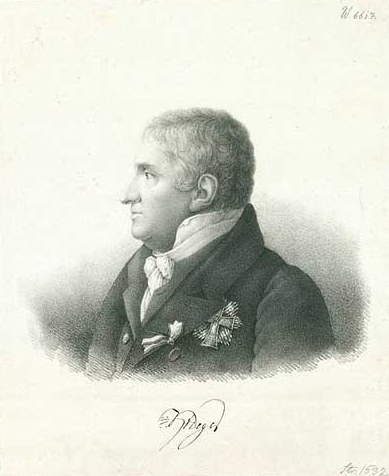
Johan Cornelius Krieger

=== Later career, 1814–1824 ===
Krieger, who was promoted to rear admiral in 1812, continued to lead this gunboat defense throughout the war until 1813. After the war, in May 1814 he succeeded Ole Andreas Kierulff as Chief of Holmen (Overekvipagemester). In this capacity, he contributed to rebuilding the Danish navy.

== Personal life ==
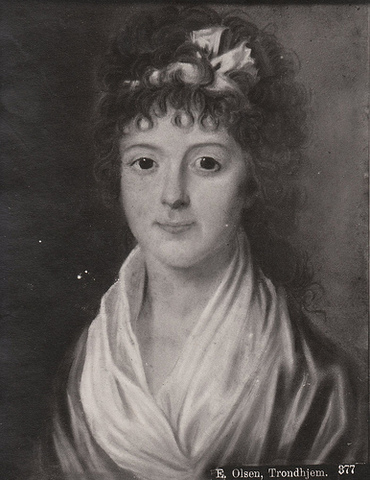
Dorothea Sara Krieger, née Maria Meincke.

Krieger was married three times. On 7 July 1787, he married Sophia Vilhelmine Caroline Bornemann (1767-1792). She was a daughter of military prosecutor Vilhelm Bornemann (1731-1801) and Talche Storm (1738-1779). Her younger sister was married to Steen Andersen Bille, one of Krieger's colleagues, who also contributed to rebuilding the Danish fleet. On 28 November 1794, Krieger married Dorothea Sara Marie Meincke (1777- 1809). She was a daughter of civil servant Lorentz Angel Meincke (1750-1811) and Margrethe Amalie Bluhme (1757–1809). On 28 May 1811, he married Anna Cathrine Falbe (1770-1843). She was a daughter of civil servant Johan Christian Falbe (1740-1801) and Anna Catharina Hagerup de Gyldenpalm (1741-1815).

Krieger died on 9 July 1824. He is buried at Copenhagen's Assistens Cemetery. He was survived by two sons and two daughters. His older son, Johan Wilhelm Cornelius Krieger (1788-1857), became a counter admiral in the Royal Danish Navy. His younger son, Christian Krieger, was killed in the Battle of Eckernförde during the Second Schleswig War in 1849. His younger daughter, Sophie Wilhelmine Caroline Krieger (1807-1889), married the politician Wolfgang von Haffner (1810-1887).
