= Frantz Hohlenberg =

Danish naval officer

Frantx Hohlenberg
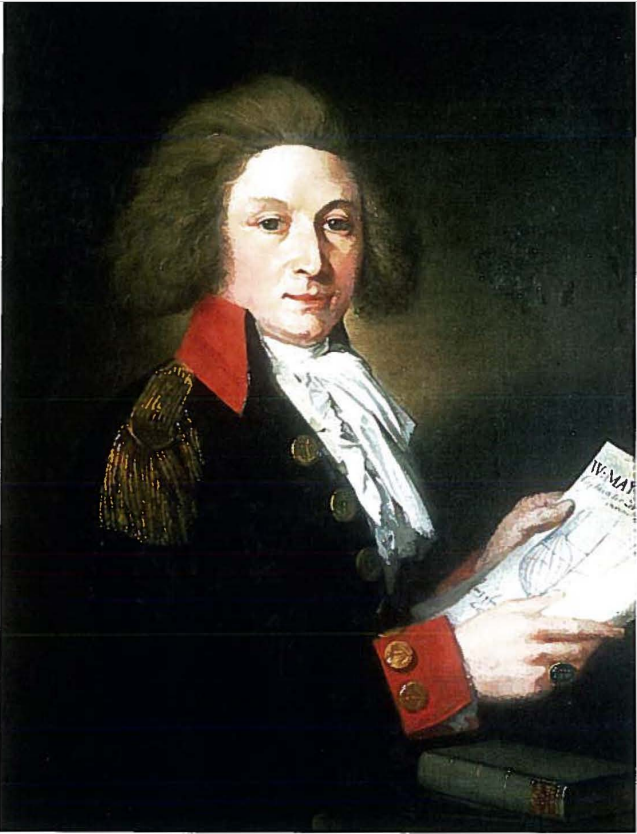

Fabriksmester of Orlægsværftet
- In office 1795–1803
- Monarch: Christian VII
- Preceded by: Ernst Wilhelm Stibolt
- Succeeded by: Group management (1814–: Andreas Schifter)

Personal details
- Born: 16 February 1765 Åbenrå, Denmark
- Died: 7 January 1804 (aged 38) Christiansted, Danish West Indies
- Spouse: Judithe Hagen (m. 1795)

Frantz Christopher Henrik Hohlenberg (16 February 1764 – 9 January 1804) was a Danish naval officer who specialised in ship design and had little seagoing experience. He succeeded Ernst Wilhelm Stibolt as Master Shipbuilder (fabriksmester) at the Royal Danish Dockyards in 1796. His ships included five ships of the line (one constructed posthumously) and 18 frigates (five constructed posthumously). Three of the ships of the line and nine of the frigates were captured at the 1807 Battle of Copenhagen and subsequently added to the Royal Navy. He resigned after a controversy in 1803.

== Early life and family ==
Hohlenberg was born on 16 February 1764 (or possibly 16 February 1765) in Åbenrå, the son of Christopher Carl Henrik Hohlenberg (1728–73) and Øllegaard Hedevig Grabow (1739–1807). His father was a captain in the navy. He became a junior lieutenant in the Danish Navy at the age of 18 and began an apprenticeship with the Danish Construction Commission. Soon after his appointment, he made a study tour of naval establishments of southern Europe, and later of Sweden and Russia. He was considered the most gifted of Henrik Gerner's pupils when Gerner was fabrikmester at Copenhagen and inherited all of Gerner's papers on the latter's death.

He married on-30 January 1795 in Holmen Church Elise Judithe Hagen (1771–1814), daughter of pharmacist Matthias Hagen (1738–1802) and Birgitte Catharine Søbøtker (1749–1831). Kong Salomons Apotek ("King Solomon's Pharmacy", Østergade 56)), one of the oldest pharmacies in Copenhagen, was owned by her father and later by her brother Johannes Hagen. One of her sisters was married to Jens Michelsen Beck. Frantz and Elise Hohlenberg had three children. Their eldest son Hagen Hohlenberg (1797–1845) would become a professor of theology at the University of Copenhagen. His younger brother Johannes Søbøtker Hohlenberg (1795–1833) served as governor of Serampore in Danish India from 1828 until his death.

== Career ==
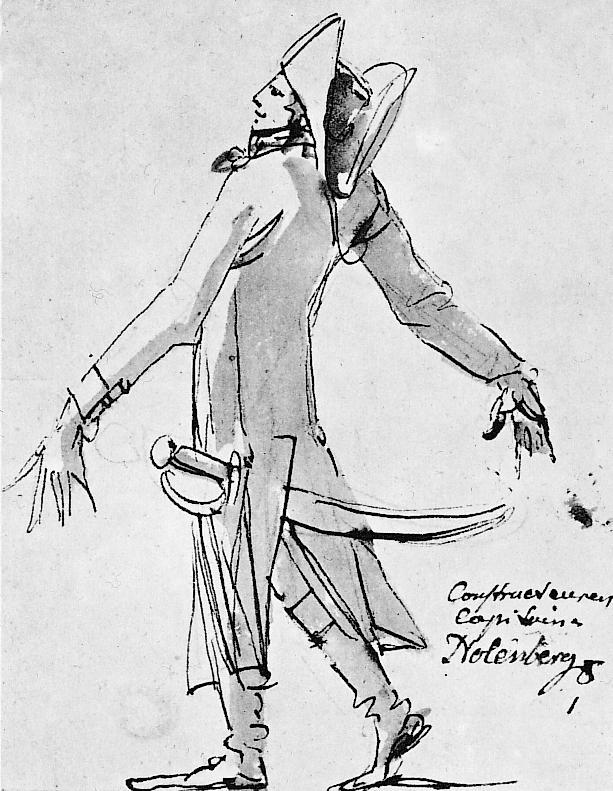
Frantz Hohlenberg, sketch by Johan Tobias Sergel.

In 1795 he became a lecturer in shipbuilding at the Naval Cadet Academy and at the same time a fully fledged member of the Construction Commission. Promoted to the most senior lieutenant's rank (Note: Kapitejnlieutenant – immediately below full captain in rank) in 1796, he became interim fabrikmester (master shipbuilder to the Royal Danish-Norwegian Navy) as his predecessor E W Stibolt retired on health grounds, (Note: Political and personal rivalries made the position of fabrikmester a very stressful post!) a position confirmed in 1797.

In 1801 he was appointed to the Defence Commission. A report which disapproved of his handling of the building of the frigate Rota upset him greatly and at the age of 38, in 1803, Hohlenberg resigned his post and travelled to the Danish West Indies to become harbourmaster and chief pilot at Christiansted on St Croix. He died shortly after arrival on 9 January 1804. He was buried on the island, but the position of his grave was not recorded.
The position of fabrikmester at the Danish Naval Dockyards remained unfilled until, in 1810, Jens Jøgen Pihl was appointed.

== Hohlenberg's ships ==
Of the four ships-of-the-line built to Hohlenberg's designs, three were seized by the British at the Battle of Copenhagen (1807) and used by British shipyards. Their design and build qualities were greatly admired by the British naval officers who later served in them.

Eleven frigates are also attributed to Hohlenberg along with a number of lesser ships which suffered from being too narrow in the beam. It may have been this latter characteristic that was responsible for the loss of HDMS Hvide Ørn (1798) which capsized with the loss of all hands (including Frantz Hohlenberg's younger brother, Johan) in the Mediterranean the year after it was commissioned.

Ships-of-the-line

- HDMS Norge (1800) (1800, captured in 1807)
- HDMS Christian den Syvende (1803) (1803, captured in 1807)
- HDMS Prinds Christian Frederik (1803, destroyed in March 1808 at the Battle of Zealand Point)
- HDMS Prindsesse Caroline (1805) (65, captured in 1807)
- HDMS Danmark (1817)

Frigates;

Of the thirteen Hohlenberg frigates built prior to 1807, nine were captured by the British Royal Navy at the Battle of Copenhagen (1807). All were commissioned into the Royal Navy.

- HDMS Najaden (1796)
- HDMS Hvide Ørn (1798) (1798)
- HDMS Fridericksteen (1799) (1800)
- HDMS Elven (1799) (1800)
- HDMS Rota (1791) (1801)
- HDMS Eideren (1802) (1802)
- HDMS Fylla (1792) (1802), a little frigate.
- HDMS Diana (1794)
- HDMS Perlen (1704) (1802)
- HDMS Glückstadt (1804) (1804)
- HDMS Venus (1795) (1805)
- HDMS Nymphen (1807) (1807)
- HDMS Najaden (1711) (1811)
- HDMS Perlen (1712) (1812)
- HDMS Venus (1712) (1812)
- HDMS Minerva (1813) (1913)
- HDMS Nymphen (1715) (1815)
- HDMS Fylla (1816)

Lesser ships

- 3 brigs
  - HDMS Brevdrageren (1801)
  - HDMS Fama (1802) (1802)
  - HDMS Femern (1803)
- 4 schooners
  - HDMS Svanen (1799)
- 1 royal yacht
- 7 artillery prams (barges)
- 1 mortar vessel

Under construction

Ships still under construction in 1807 were to Hohlenberg's designs, but were destroyed on the stocks during the Battle of Copenhagen (1807). A later frigate, HDMS Najaden (1811) became a victim of British naval action at the Battle of Lyngør

== Citations ==
- Dansk Militærhistorie website
- Project Runeberg – Dansk biografisk Lexikon / VII. Bind. I. Hansen – Holmsted /
- Royal Danish Naval Museum – List of ships
- Royal Danish Naval Museum – (orlogsbasen) From the DATABASE > AVANCEREDE > Set Konstruktør to Hohlenberg > Søg. (This works only when the language is set to Danish)
- Skibregister, for individual ship record cards
- (in Danish)T. A. Topsøe-Jensen og Emil Marquard (1935) “Officerer i den dansk-norske Søetat 1660-1814 og den danske Søetat 1814-1932“. Volume 1 and Volume 2
- da:Frantz Hohlenberg
