= HDMS Sarpen =

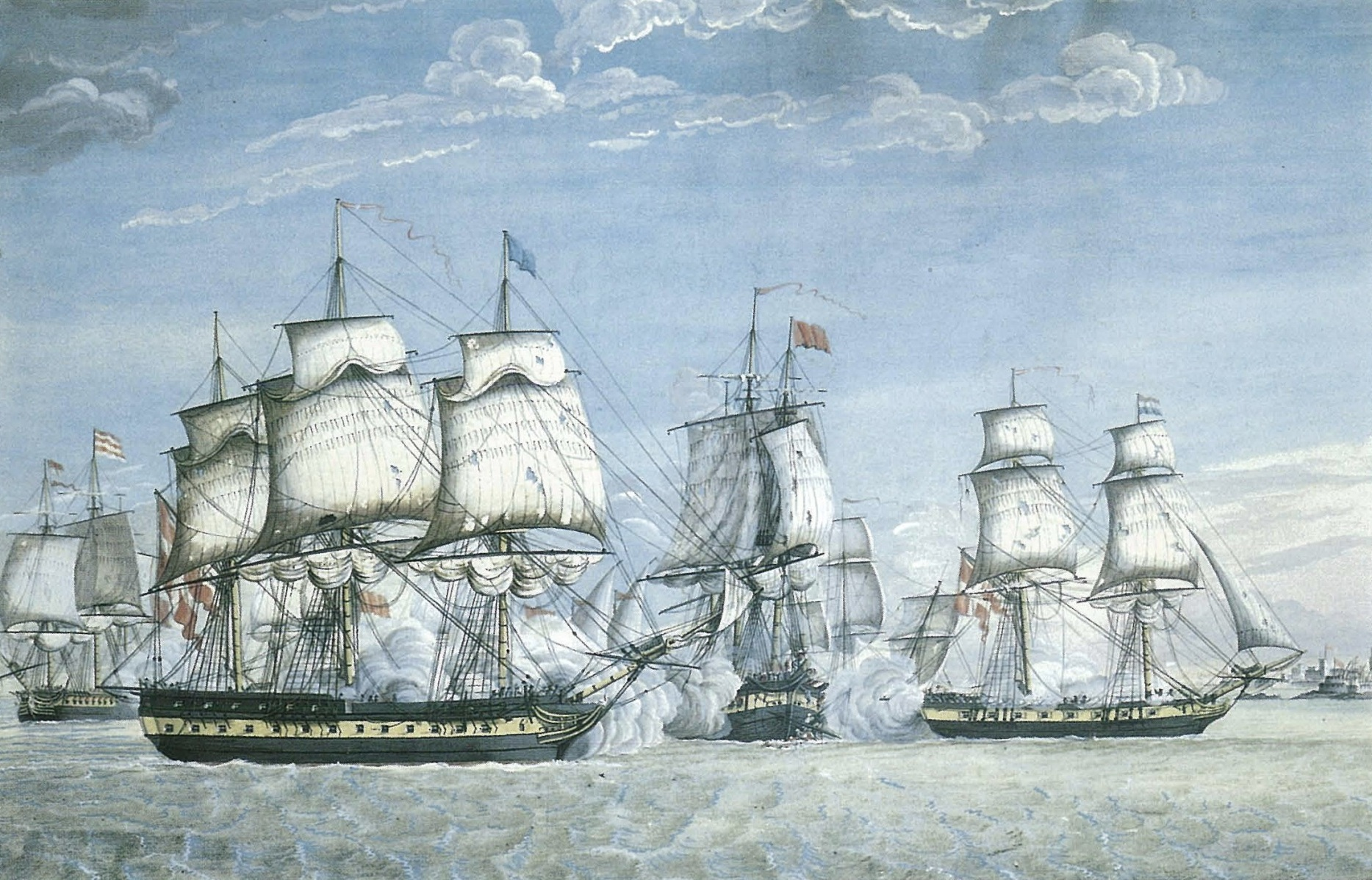
- Sarpen (first from right) at the action of 16 May 1797

History

Denmark-Norway
- Name: Sarpen
- Namesake: Sarp Falls
- Builder: Stibolt at Tønsberg, Norway
- Launched: 24 September 1791
- Fate: Surrendered to the British after the Battle of Copenhagen

United Kingdom
- Name: Sarpen
- Acquired: Captured from Denmark 7 September 1807
- Commissioned: 1808
- Fate: Broken up August 1811

General characteristics
- Class & type: Lougen-class brig
- Tons burthen: 3082/94 (bm)
- Length: 94 ft 5 in (28.8 m) (gundeck); 77 ft 6 1/8 in (23.6 m)(keel)
- Beam: 27 ft 4 in (8.3 m)
- Depth of hold: 10 ft 3 in (3.1 m)
- Complement: 100 in British service
- Armament: 16 × 24-pounder carronades; 2 × 6-pounder chase guns

HDMS Sarpen was a brig of the Royal Dano-Norwegian Navy, in which she served from 1791 until the British seized her in 1807. While in Dano-Norwegian service she participated in an indecisive action at Tripoli, North Africa. She served the Royal Navy as HMS Sarpen from 1808 until 1811 when she was broken up. During her brief British service she participated in the Walcheren Expedition. Her name is that of a waterfall on the Norwegian river Glomma.

== Design ==
Sarpen was one nine Lougen-class brigs designed by the naval architect Ernst Wilhelm Stibolt. The British captured six in 1807.

== Dano-Norwegian service ==
In the action of 16 May 1797, Sarpen, under Captain Charles Christian De Holck, with Captain Steen Andersen Bille in overall command in the frigate Najaden, participated in a punitive attack at Tripoli. The battle lasted for about two hours before the Tripolitans retreated. The Danes suffered one man killed and one wounded. As a result of the Danish victory, the Bey of Tripoli signed a peace treaty with Denmark on 25 May.

On his return to Malta from Tripoli, De Holck, performed his quarantine of 38 days at the Lazzaretto in Marsamuscietto, together with Lieut. John Munk, Lieut. Emanuel Krieger, Lieut. Wolfgang Kaas, Commissar Gabriel Hetting and Doctor Mark Klausen. In acknowledgement of the kind treatment they had received, De Holck set up a commemorative marble tablet on 10 October 1797.

During the battle of Copenhagen in 1801, Sarpen was under the command of Captain Lieutenant Carl Farbriuis de Tengnagel. Prior to the battle the Danes had sent her to The Skaw to serve as the eyes of the fleet. She served in Olfert Fischer's division in the Inner Run under Chamberlain Steen Bille and did not engage in any actual fighting.

== British service ==
The British took possession of Sarpen under the terms of capitulation following the second battle of Copenhagen on 7 September 1807. Sarpen arrived on 7 November at Chatham where she was fitted out from November to August 1808. She was to be renamed Voltiguer but the Admiralty canceled the name change. After refit she joined the British Navy as HMS Sarpen.

Commander James Gifford took command of Sarpen on 16 May 1808 for the North Sea and Baltic. In 1809 she came under the command of Commander John Sanderson Gibson and participated in the Walcheren Expedition. She took up station off Blackenbeg (probably Blankenberge). In early May Gibson boarded a vessel with an English license and found out from the Master information about the size and status of the French fleet at Terneuzen. Gibson passed the information up the chain of command to Admiral Sir Richard J. Strachan. Similarly, on 29 June, boats from Sarpen captured a boat and took five prisoners. Gibson interrogated the prisoners from whom he learned that the French were stringing a chain across the river at Antwerp to prevent an attack by fire ships. By October 1809, however, Sarpen was at Anholt, to which she had escorted four supply ships.

== Fate ==
Sarpen was paid off on 22 December 1809 and laid up at Sheerness. She was broken up there in August 1811.

== See also ==
- List of ships captured during Battle of Copenhagen
