= Action of 16 May 1797 =

Naval battle near Tripoli, Libya

Coordinates: 32°54′8″N 13°11′9″E

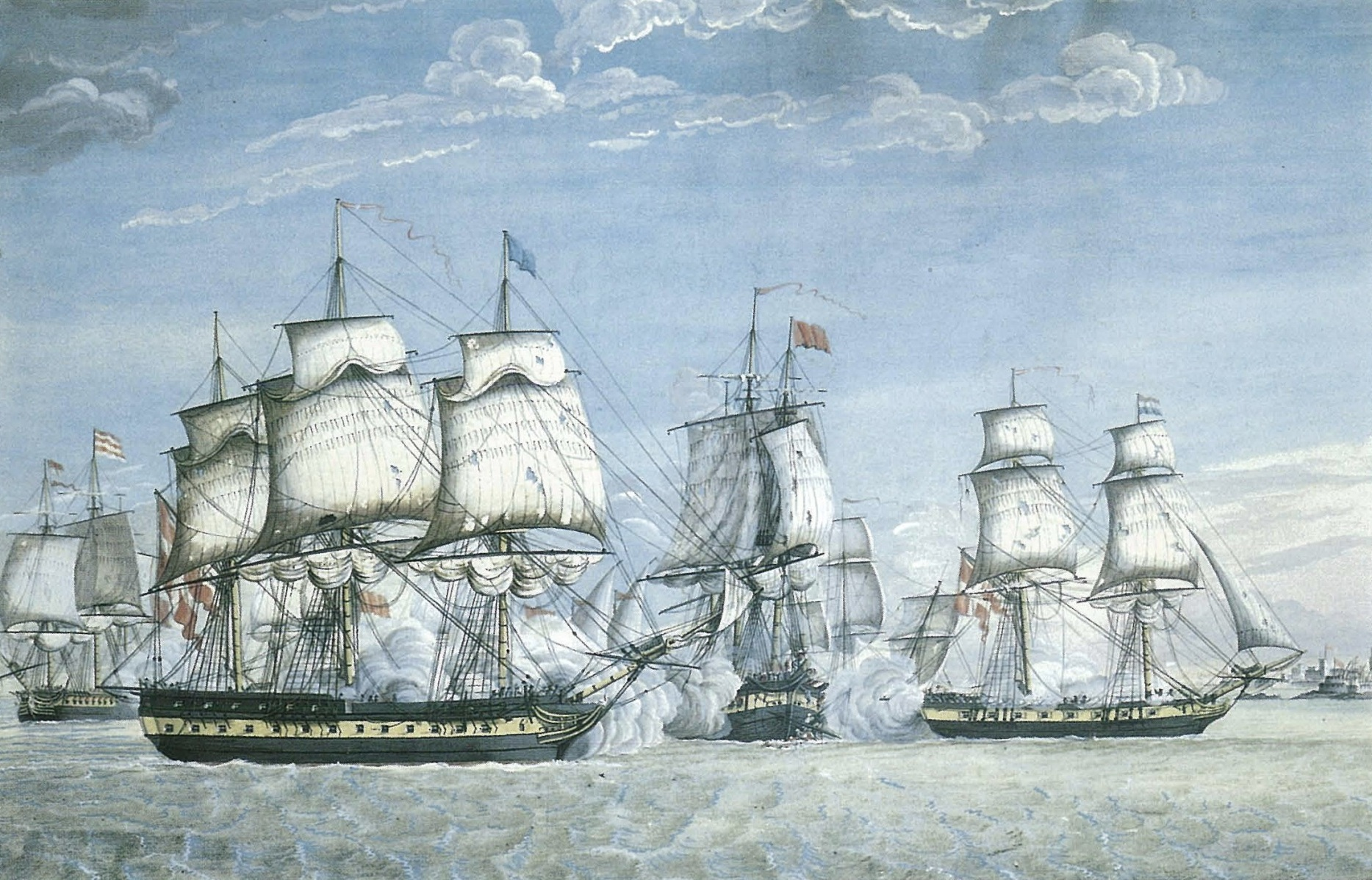
- Painting of the action
Date	16 May 1797
Location	Off Tripoli, Tripolitania
Result	See Aftermath

Belligerents
Denmark–Norway	Tripolitania

Commanders and leaders
Steen Andersen Bille	Yusuf Karamanli

Strength
1 frigate 1 brig 1 xebec	3 xebecs 3 smaller vessels

Casualties and losses
At least 1 killed and 1 wounded	Unknown

The Action of 16 May 1797 was a naval battle that took place near Tripoli in Ottoman Tripolitania (present-day Libya). The Danish squadron was attacked by a Tripolitan squadron that outnumbered them in number of vessels.

== Background ==
After the newly appointed Bey of Tripoli, Sidi Yussuf, demanded an increased tribute, which essentially constituted a bribe to stop Tripolitans preying on Danish merchant ships. He also captured two Danish vessels, whose crews he sold into slavery. As a result, Denmark-Norway sent Captain Lorenz Fisker in the 40-gun frigate Thetis to Tripoli. He had two missions: first, to escort the annual "gift ship" to Algiers, and second, to secure the freedom of the two Danish vessels and their crews. He arrived at Tripoli on 30 August 1796, but failed to free the captured sailors, or even agree on a ransom price.

== Action ==
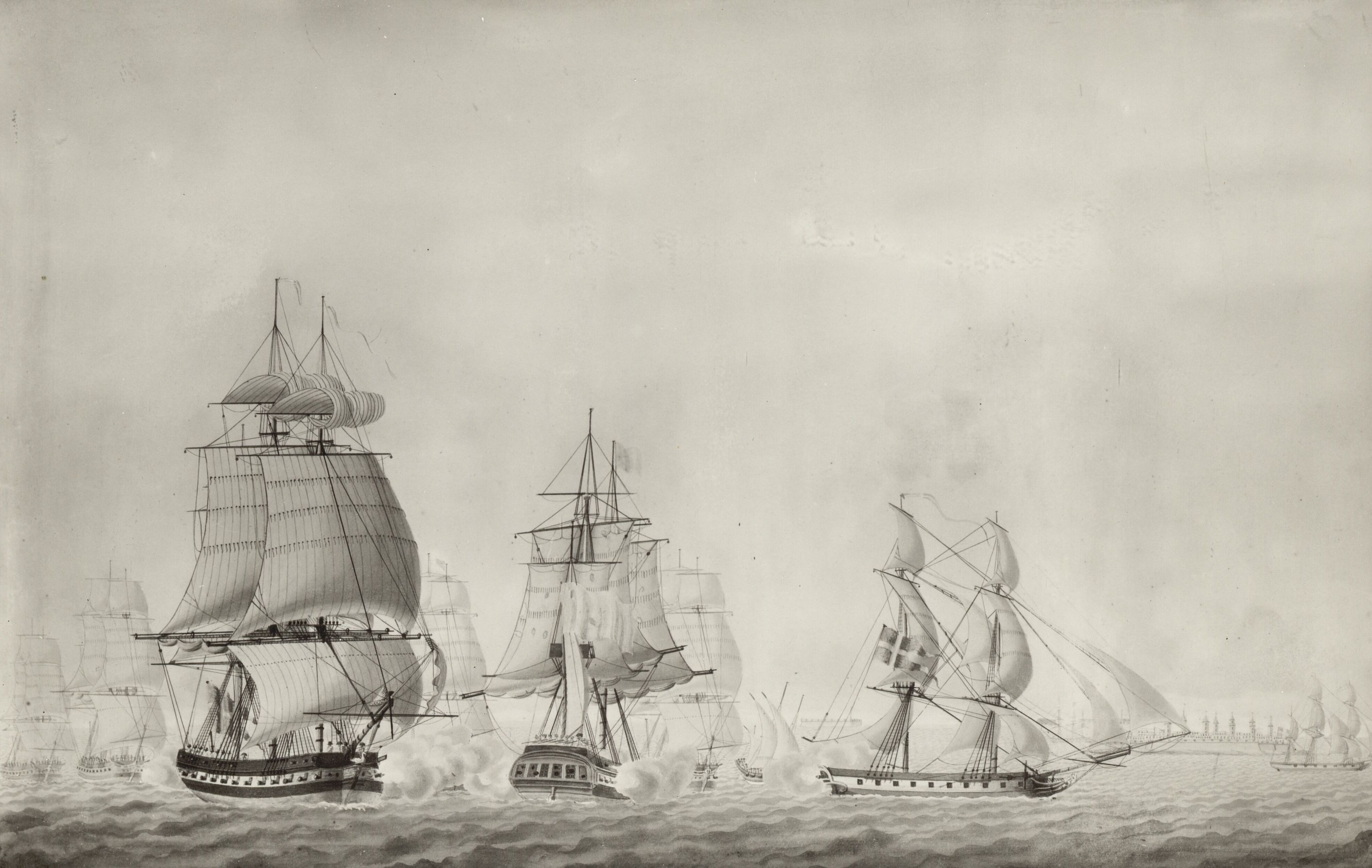
Painting of the action

The Danes, therefore, decided to make a second attempt. They sent Captain Steen Andersen Bille in the frigate Najaden 40 under Captain John Hoppe to Malta, where she arrived on 2 May 1797. There the Danes met up with the brig Sarpen 18, under Captain Charles Christian De Holck. They also hired a xebec of six guns, which was then sailed by a Danish crew under Lieutenant Hans Munck (or Munk), of Sarpen. This squadron then sailed from Malta for Tripoli. On 12 May, off the coast of Lampedusa, they met with Fisker and Thetis. Fisker transferred command of Danish forces in the Mediterranean to Bille and sailed for home. Bille's small squadron sailed past the forts guarding Tripoli on 15 May 1797. Among the guns firing on the Danish vessels from the forts were four Danish cannons that the Libyan envoy Abderahman al Bidiri had obtained from the King of Denmark-Norway in 1772.

On 16 May Najaden sailed into the harbour and attacked the six armed vessels there. The Tripolitan forces consisted of the 28-gun xebec Meshuda, two other xebecs of similar size and three smaller vessels. Although the Danish cannon fire caused extensive casualties among the Tripolitans, the latter nevertheless got close to the Danish vessels and almost managed to board Najaden. Hoppe's deft manoeuvring forestalled defeat. Although the two smaller Danish ships were more of a hindrance than a help, the Tripolitans retreated after two hours. Danish casualties were one killed and one wounded. Subsequent negotiations resulted in a peace treaty on 25 May. Denmark-Norway agreed to continue to pay tribute.

== Aftermath ==
Bille remained in the Mediterranean until 1801 with a force that the Danish government increased to three frigates and two brigs. After the Danish government recalled him to become the chief of the naval defence, the Danish flotilla remained, continuing to protect Danish shipping for a few more years. Bille went on to command a division of the navy in the Battle of Copenhagen.

The Norwegian Poul S. Stub, who was held in slavery in Tripoli after his merchant ship Providentia had been captured, observed the battle from the land and wrote up his impressions.

== Ships involved ==
=== Denmark-Norway ===
- Najaden 40 (flag)
- Sarpen 18
- Unnamed xebec

=== Tripolitania ===
- Meshuda 28
- 2 other xebecs of 28 guns
- 3 smaller vessels
