= HDMS Hvide Ørn (1798) =

Danish frigate

History

Denmark-Norway
- Builder: Hohlenberg at Nyholm, Copenhagen
- Launched: 1798
- Fate: Capsized and lost with all hands 29 December 1799

General characteristics
- Class & type: Frigate
- Tons burthen: 348½ lst
- Length: 129 ft 2 in (39.37 m)
- Beam: 32 ft 6 in (9.91 m)
- Draught: 13 ft 0 in (3.96 m) aft; 14 ft 0 in (4.27 m) fore
- Propulsion: sail
- Complement: 180 men
- Armament: 24 × 8-pounder guns + 6 × 8-pounder howitzers + 4 × 6-pounder guns

HDMS Hvide Ørn (White Eagle), was a light frigate designed by Frantz Hohlenberg and built in Copenhagen. She capsized and was lost with all hands off Corsica at the end of 1799. There were three previous ships bearing this name in the Danish navy. The name was after the loss of the ship retired. An 1898 model of the ship is in the collection of the Royal Danish Naval Museum.

== Officers ==
- Hans Michael Kaas captained Hvide Ørn (in company with HDMS Helleflynderen under captain Hans Mossin) as she escorted a convoy of fifteen Dano-Norwegian merchantmen from Flekkerøy on 5 November 1798 to the Mediterranean. In the English Channel, a Royal Navy frigate attempted to inspect the convoy, which arrived off Lisbon on 13 December. Captain Kaas' was suffering from extreme fatigue as Hvide Ørn continued to the Mediterranean where he was helped by the seconding from the Danish frigate Triton of Kaptein-lieutenant J D van der Osten as a second captain.

In April 1799 extra ballast (in the form of 200 pieces of ballast iron) was bought and added to Hvide Ørn to make the ship stiffer in handling. On 29 April a storm in Livorno harbour drove her ashore. The damage was repaired under van der Osten's professional supervision. As Captain Kaas' health improved slightly and then deteriorated he was replaced as captain by van Osten on 14 August 1799 and travelled back to Denmark with Triton. Hans Kaas died as Triton arrived back in Copenhagen on 5 October 1799.

- Jan David van der Osten, captain, took command of Hvide Ørn in July 1799 when the previous captain, H M Kaas, took sick leave. His last report before leaving Livorno on 23 December 1799 was that the ship was in good order and the crew all well.
- Johan Hohlenberg, junior lieutenant, younger brother of the ship's designer, went down with the ship.
- Other officers lost with the ship were Robert Ferdinand Moltke Lynch, senior lieutenant, Jacob Meyer, second in command, and Joost von Hemmert, senior lieutenant.

== Loss ==
The ship left Livorno on 26 December 1799 and disappeared on the night of 29/30 December in a hurricane force storm 18 Danish miles (One Danish mile = 7.532 Km) west of Corsica. (Note: This reference gives two near-contemporary references to the loss. Neither is immediately available online.: Steen Bille: Det danske Flag i Middelhavet i Slutningen af det 18de Aarhundrede : et bidrag til den danske Marines historie pp 337 - 342; I H Schultz: Den Danske Marine pp 121 - 122)

== Citations ==
- Project Runeberg – Dansk biografisk Lexikon / VII. Bind. I. Hansen – Holmsted /
- Royal Danish Naval Museum – List of ships
- (in Danish)T. A. Topsøe-Jensen og Emil Marquard (1935) “Officerer i den dansk-norske Søetat 1660-1814 og den danske Søetat 1814-1932“. Two volumes. Volume 1 and Volume 2
