= Frederik Christian Kaas (1725–1803) =

Danish naval officer and admiral

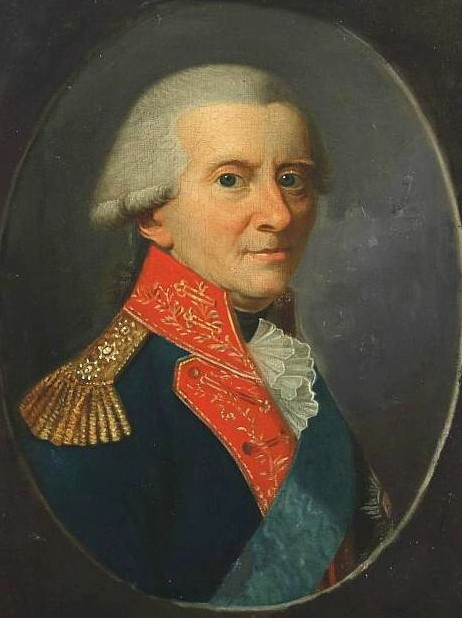
- Born: 1 December 1725; Rydbjerg, Ringkøbing, Denmark-Norway
- Died: 18 January 1803 (aged 77); Copenhagen, Denmark-Norway
- Burial place: Fraugde Church
- Military career
- Allegiance: Denmark-Norway
- Branch: Royal Dano-Norwegian Navy
- Service years: 1739 - 1781
- Rank: Admiral
- Conflicts: Danish–Algerian War

Frederik Christian Kaas (1725–1803) was a naval officer and admiral in the service of the Danish-Norwegian Crown.

== Personal life ==
The son of Commander Hans Kaas and Agatha Rodsteen nee Banner, Frederik Christian Kaas was born on 1 December 1725 at Rydbjerg near Ringkøbing fjord.

In 1748 he was granted leave to travel to Holland at his own expense for treatment of a wound on one cheek.

He married his first wife, Susanne Jacoba Fabritius, in 1757 (she died 1762). In 1764, after a period of dubious health, he married his second wife, Christine Elisabeth Birgitte Juul.

== Service career and promotions ==
- 1739 Cadet
- 1743 Junior Lieutenant in the snow Hekla acting as the cadet training ship, and then 1745 -1746 with the frigate Falster to the Mediterranean, where his ship joined the squadron commanded by Ulrik Danneskiold-Samsøe off Algiers.
- From 1746 as a Senior Lieutenant. He held various appointments at the royal court from 1750 to 1760 In 1750 he was second in command of the frigate Docquen, then acting in a cadet training role. In 1751 he took part in Captain Hooglant's diplomatic expedition to Morocco, where he was placed in charge of the expedition's trading ships. While on land at the newly established trading station he was arrested (with other military and civil staff) and held by the Moroccans and released only on 3 June 1753 after completion of the treaty in May 1753. Returning to Denmark on the frigate Christiansborg he received the king's expression of his satisfaction with Lieutenant Kaas' behaviour during his two years' captivity and the rank-skipping promotion to captain. (Note: He was certainly promoted to the rank of captain in 1755. One reference records he was promoted in 1753 to captain-lieutenant immediately on release from captivity.) In 1754 he sailed again to Morocco as captain of the trading ship Fridericus Quartus.
- As Captain-Lieutenant from 1753, and as Captain from 1755, he took part in several more voyages with ships-of-the-line to the Mediterranean before 1760 in one of which he carried the diplomat Lucas who was to be Danish consul at Morocco. On return to Denmark his ship, Slesvig, was quarantined for eight days but Kaas, as captain, was permitted ashore.
- 1758 Commander.He was captain of the frigate Møen in a convoy to the Mediterranean, and on return received instructions from the Treasury about a new mission in Tunis which he undertook with two frigates under his command. On his return in November 1758 he ran the frigates into Frederiksværn, in Norway as their winter quarters and then travelled on to Copenhagen to deliver his report on the Barbary States From this time he was in great demand as commander of various ships-of-the-line in the active squadrons, commanding the ship-of-the-line Oldenborg in Danish home waters in 1759 and 1762.
- 1766 Commodore. From this year he held positions in the Admiralty and Commissariat College, rising in seniority (as with his naval rank) to 1775 to first deputy and royal representative. His position lasted until his retirement in 1781
- 1768 Rear Admiral. In 1769 Denmark-Norway equipped a major expedition to Algeria and placed Rear Admiral Kaas, with his extensive knowledge and reputation in that area, in command. The task force sailed in May 1770, but when negotiations failed, proved unsuitable for forcing the issue - the ships-of-the-line had too great a draught, the bomb ships were poorly equipped. and the crews were severely weakened by typhoid and dysentery. Replaced in command by Rear Admiral Hooglant, (Note: see Danish wikipedia da:Simon Hooglant) Kaas returned to Denmark demanding an investigation and court martial into the failed expedition. This concluded that Kaas and several other senior figures held some degree of blame and, although nobody was found culpable when the enquiry was halted by the government, two officers (including J. H. E. Bernstorff) retired early and Kaas lost his seat as a deputy in the admiralty. For Kaas, this loss was reversed in 1772 on promotion to vice admiral. Other excuses were also found. (Note: Reasons cited for the failure included a strong east wind, lack of manpower because of sickness in the fleet, the bomb vessels were unable to operate properly and the Algiers fortress was much stronger than expected)
- 1772 Vice Admiral. Apart from command of a squadron in the Baltic in 1773, the remainder of Kaas' career was spent on administration ashore as leader of the admiralty
- 1775 Admiral

== Honours ==
- In 1768 he became a Ridder of Dannebrog
- In 1790 he was awarded the Order of the Elephant.

== Retirement and death ==
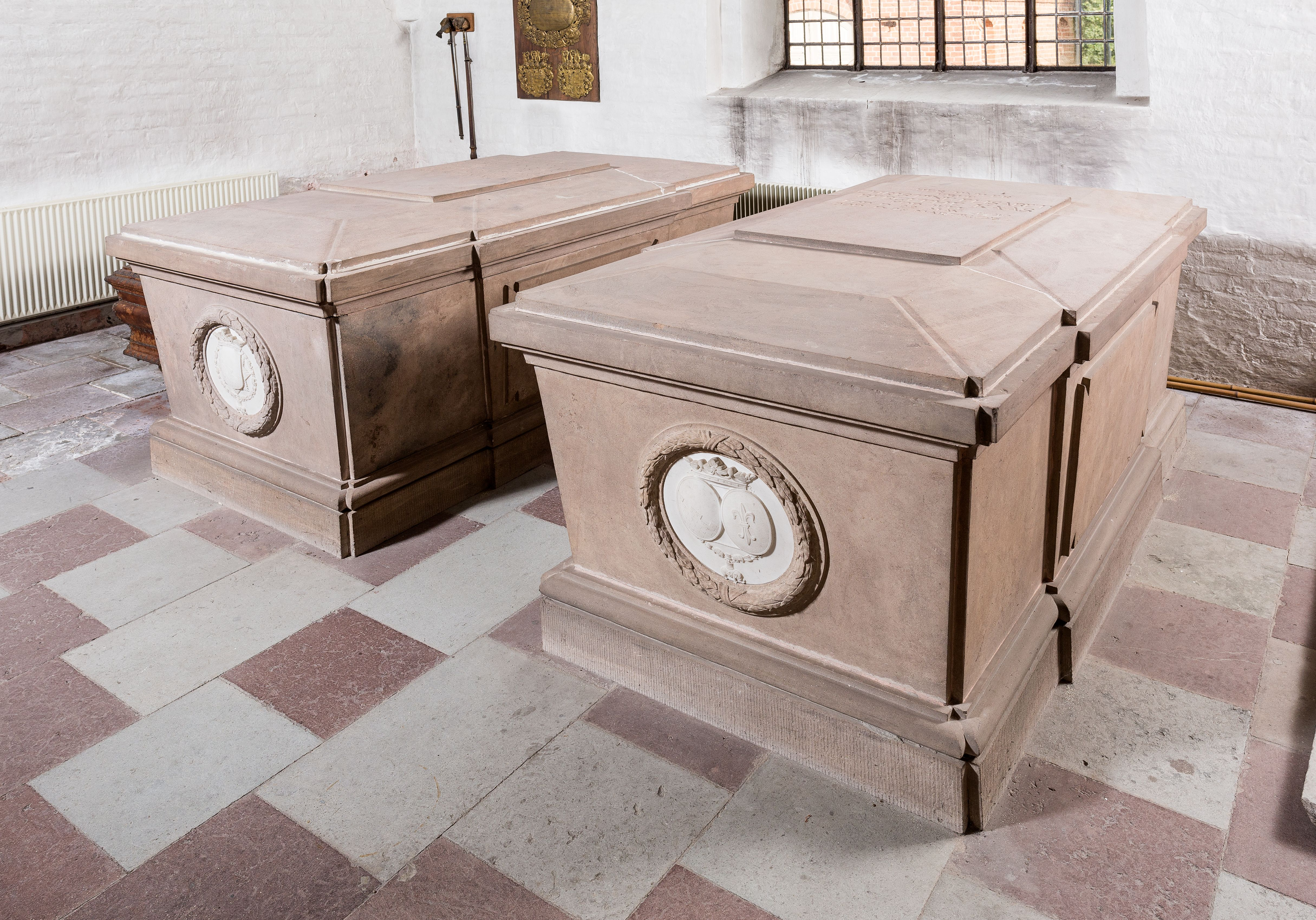
Frederik Christian Kaas and Christine Elisabeth Kaas' sarcophagi in Fraugde Church.

Kaas spent much of his retirement from 1781 peacefully on his estate, Fraugdegaard near Odense on the island of Funen. He died 18 January 1803 in Copenhagen. His sarcophagus, and that of his wife, lie side-by-side in the chapel of Fraugde Church.

== Citations ==
- (in Danish) Project Runeberg: C With on Frederik Christian Kaas (1725–1803) in Danish Biographical Lexikon Vol 9 page 53–55
- (in Danish) T. A. Topsøe-Jensen og Emil Marquard (1935) “Officerer i den dansk-norske Søetat 1660–1814 og den danske Søetat 1814–1932" (Danish Naval Officers). Volume 1 and Volume 2
- (in Danish) Topsøe-Jensen, Th.:Frederik Christian Kaas, born 1725 in Dansk Biografisk Leksikon at lex.dk accessed 6 June 2020
